= Adaklı (disambiguation) =

Adaklı is a town in Bingöl Province, Turkey.

Adaklı may also refer to the following places in Turkey:

- Adaklı District, the district containing the town
- Adaklı, Midyat, a neighbourhood in Mardin Province
- Adaklı, Nizip or Keret, a neighbourhood in Gaziantep Province
- Adaklı, Yüksekova, a village in Hakkâri Province
