= İnanlı =

İnanlı may refer to:

- Inallu (tribe), Turkmen tribe from Iran
- İnanlı, Kilis, village in Kilis Province, Turkey
- İnanlı, Yüksekova, village in Hakkari Province, Turkey
- İnanlı, Yusufeli, village in Artvin Province, Turkey
