= Aksu, Yüksekova =

Neighborhood in Yüksekova, Turkey

Aksu
- Neighbourhood
- Location in Turkey
- Coordinates: 37.549°N 44.221°E
- Country: Turkey
- Province: Hakkâri
- District: Yüksekova
- Municipality: Yüksekova
- Population (2023): 576
- Time zone: UTC+3 (TRT)

Aksu (Syriac: Gāgōran, Kurdish: Gagewran) is a neighborhood to Yüksekova in Yüksekova District of Hakkâri Province in Turkey. It is populated by Kurds of the Pinyanişî tribe and had a population of 576 in 2023.

The village is located near Hakkari–Yüksekova Airport.

Aksu was a village until 2023.

== History ==
The village was populated by 15 Assyrian families in 1850 and 20 families in 1877.

== Population ==
Population history from 2007 to 2023:

Population
| Year | Pop. | ±% |
|---|---|---|
| 2007 | 475 | — |
| 2012 | 519 | +9.3% |
| 2017 | 553 | +6.6% |
| 2022 | 539 | −2.5% |
| 2023 | 576 | +6.9% |
