= Güçlü, Yüksekova =

Neighborhood in Yüksekova, Turkey

Güçlü
- Neighbourhood
- Location in Turkey
- Coordinates: 37.5666°N 44.321°E
- Country: Turkey
- Province: Hakkâri
- District: Yüksekova
- Municipality: Yüksekova
- Population (2023): 807
- Time zone: UTC+3 (TRT)

Güçlü (Kurdish: Peylan, Syriac: Pā'ilan) is a neighborhood in Yüksekova in Yüksekova District of Hakkâri Province in Turkey. It is populated by Kurds of the Dirî tribe and had a population of 807 in 2023.

Güçlü was a village until 2023.

== History ==
The village was populated by 20 Assyrian families in 1850 and 5 families in 1877.

== Population ==
Population history from 1997 to 2023:

Population
Year	Pop.	±%
1997	602	—
2007	744	+23.6%
2012	826	+11.0%
2017	790	−4.4%
2022	846	+7.1%
2023	807	−4.6%
