= Çukurca, Yüksekova =

Village in Hakkari Province, Turkey

Çukurca
- Village
- Location within Turkey
- Coordinates: 37.505°N 44.403°E
- Country: Turkey
- Province: Hakkâri
- District: Yüksekova
- Population (2023): 554
- Time zone: UTC+3 (TRT)

Çukurca (Kurdish: Pagê, Syriac: Pāge) is a village in the Yüksekova District of Hakkâri Province in Turkey. It is populated by Kurds of the Dirî tribe and had a population of 554 in 2023. Çukurca was a hamlet of Demirkonak before receiving village status in 2014.

== History ==
The village was populated by 15 Assyrian families in 1850 and 30 families in 1877.

== Population ==
Population history of the village from 2015 to 2023:

Population
Year	Pop.	±%
2015	591	—
2018	592	+0.2%
2020	607	+2.5%
2023	554	−8.7%
