= Altınoluk, Yüksekova =

Neighborhood in Yüksekova, Turkey

Altınoluk
- Neighbourhood
- Location in Turkey
- Coordinates: 37.560°N 44.343°E
- Country: Turkey
- Province: Hakkâri
- District: Yüksekova
- Municipality: Yüksekova
- Population (2023): 695
- Time zone: UTC+3 (TRT)

Altınoluk (Kurdish: Elver) is a neighborhood in Yüksekova in Yüksekova District of Hakkâri Province in Turkey. It is populated by Kurds of the Dirî and Kaşuran tribes and had a population of 695 in 2023.

Altınoluk was a village until 2023.

== Population ==
Population history from 1997 to 2023:

Population
Year	Pop.	±%
1997	508	—
2007	669	+31.7%
2012	750	+12.1%
2017	752	+0.3%
2023	695	−7.6%
