= Gökçeli =

Gökçeli may refer to:

== People ==
- Kemal Sadık Gökçeli or Yaşar Kemal (1923–2015), Kurdish writer and activist

== Places ==
- Gökçeli, Adaklı, a village in Bingöl Province, Turkey
- Gökçeli, Bayburt, a village in Bayburt Province, Turkey
- Gökçeli, Bingöl, a village in Bingöl Province, Turkey
- Gökçeli, Bozüyük, a village in Bilecik Province, Turkey
- Gökçeli, Dinar, a village in Afyonkarahisar Province, Turkey
- Gökçeli, Göynücek, a village in Amasya Province, Turkey
- Gökçeli, Niksar, a town in Tokat Province, Turkey
- Gökçeli, Nizip, historically Kürep, a village in Gaziantep Province, Turkey
- Gökçeli, Yüreğir, a neighbourhood in Adana Province, Turkey
