= Güllüce, Yüksekova =

Neighborhood in Yüksekova, Turkey

Güllüce
- Neighbourhood
- Location in Turkey
- Coordinates: 37.594°N 44.289°E
- Country: Turkey
- Province: Hakkâri
- District: Yüksekova
- Municipality: Yüksekova
- Population (2023): 1,098
- Time zone: UTC+3 (TRT)

Güllüce (Kurdish: Sekran) is a neighborhood in Yüksekova in Yüksekova District of Hakkâri Province in Turkey. It is populated by Kurds of the Dirî tribe and had a population of 1,098 in 2023. The hamlet of Bulgurlu is attached to the village.

Güllüce was a village until 2023.

== Population ==
Population history from 2007 to 2023:

Population
Year	Pop.	±%
2007	1,566	—
2012	892	−43.0%
2017	980	+9.9%
2022	1,140	+16.3%
2023	1,098	−3.7%
