= Bölük, Yüksekova =

Neighborhood in Yüksekova, Turkey

Bölük
- Neighbourhood
- Location in Turkey
- Coordinates: 37.616°N 44.302°E
- Country: Turkey
- Province: Hakkâri
- District: Yüksekova
- Municipality: Yüksekova
- Population (2023): 868
- Time zone: UTC+3 (TRT)

Bölük (Kurdish: Bolûk) is a neighborhood in Yüksekova in Yüksekova District of Hakkâri Province in Turkey. It is populated by Kurds of the Dirî tribe and had a population of 868 in 2023.

Bölük was a village until 2023.

== Population ==
Population history from 1997 to 2023:

Population
Year	Pop.	±%
1997	1,124	—
2008	711	−36.7%
2012	775	+9.0%
2017	830	+7.1%
2022	867	+4.5%
2023	868	+0.1%
