= YKO =

YKO or yko may refer to:

- Hakkari–Yüksekova Airport, Turkey (IATA:YKO)
- Yasa language, spoken in Central Africa (ISO 639-3:yko)
