= Akalın, Yüksekova =

Neighborhood in Yüksekova, Turkey

Akalın
- Neighbourhood
- Location within Turkey
- Coordinates: 37.565°N 44.242°E
- Country: Turkey
- Province: Hakkâri
- District: Yüksekova
- Municipality: Yüksekova
- Population (2023): 1,716
- Time zone: UTC+3 (TRT)

Akalın (Kurdish: Bajêrge, Syriac: Bāshirgā) is a neighborhood of Yüksekova in the Yüksekova District of Hakkâri Province in Turkey. It is populated by Kurds of the Pinyanişî tribe and had a population of 1,716 in 2023.

Akalın was a village until 2023.

== History ==
It was populated by 22 Assyrian families in 1850 and 10 families in 1877.

== Population ==
Population history from 1997 to 2023:

Population
Year	Pop.	±%
1997	599	—
2007	787	+31.4%
2012	927	+17.8%
2017	1,137	+22.7%
2022	1,610	+41.6%
2023	1,716	+6.6%
