= Köprücük =

Köprücük may refer to:

- Köprücük, Aladağ, a neighbourhood in Adana Province, Turkey
- Köprücük, Ardahan, a village in Ardahan Province, Turkey
- Köprücük, Tatvan, a village in Tatvan District, Bitlis Province, Turkey
- Köprücük, Varto, a village in Varto District, Muş Province, Turkey
- Köprücük, Yüksekova, a village in Hakkâri Province, Turkey
