= Vezirli, Yüksekova =

Neighborhood in Yüksekova, Turkey

Vezirli
- Neighbourhood
- Location in Turkey
- Coordinates: 37.527°N 44.250°E
- Country: Turkey
- Province: Hakkâri
- District: Yüksekova
- Municipality: Yüksekova
- Population (2023): 1,225
- Time zone: UTC+3 (TRT)

Vezirli (Kurdish: Vezîrawa, Syriac: Wāzirāwā) is a neighbourhood of Yüksekova in Yüksekova District of Hakkâri Province in Turkey. It had a population of 1,225 in 2023.

Vezirli was a village until 2023.

== History ==
The village was populated by 19 Assyrian families in 1850 and 35 families in 1877.
