= Doğanlı Dams =

The Doğanlı Dams are three dams planned or under construction on the Great Zab river near Doğanlı, Yüksekova in Hakkâri Province in Turkey.
