= Dedeler, Yüksekova =

Neighborhood in Hakkari Province, Turkey

Dedeler
- Neighbourhood
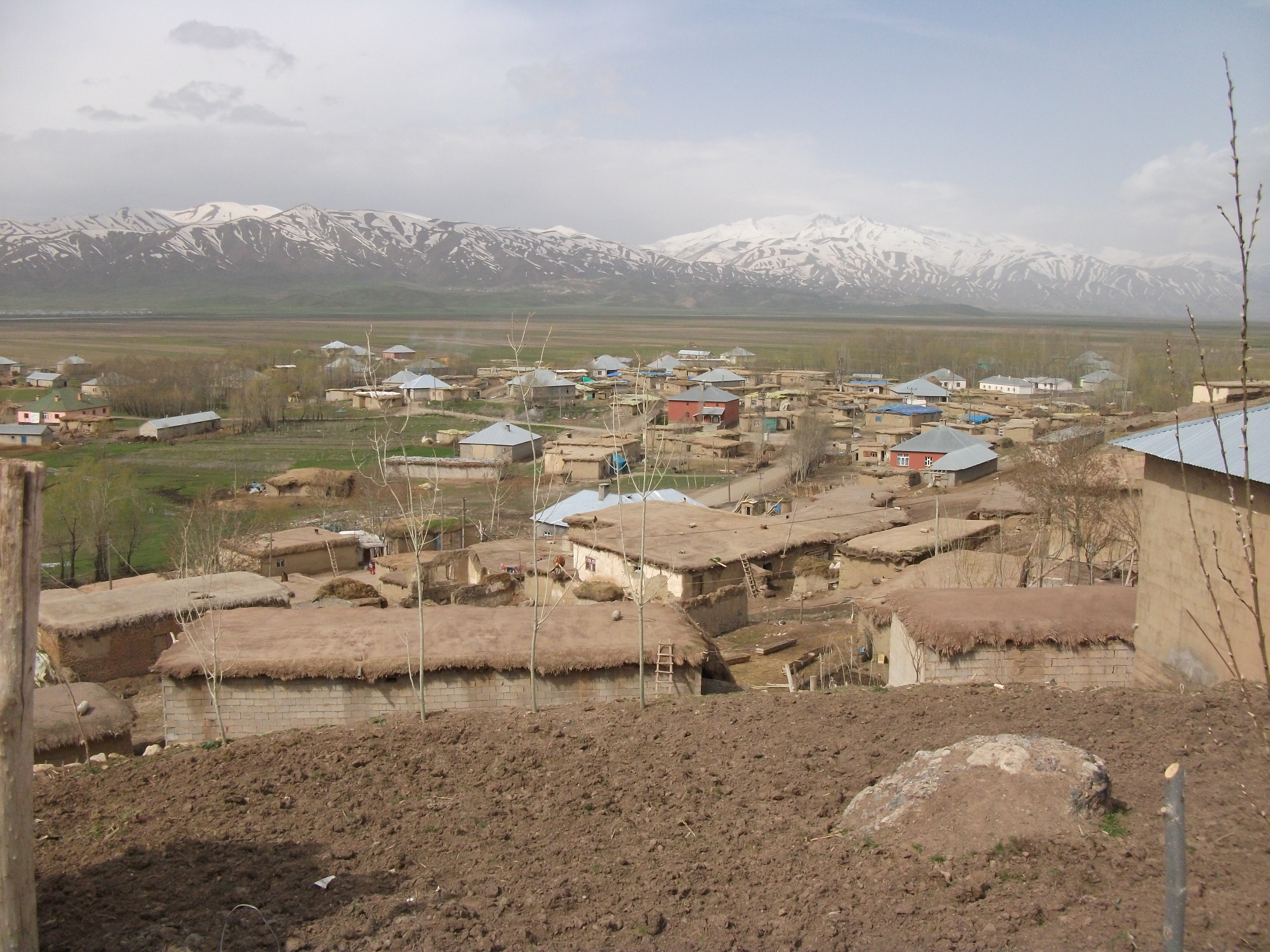
- Village

- Location within Turkey
- Coordinates: 37.498°N 44.326°E
- Country: Turkey
- Province: Hakkâri
- District: Yüksekova
- Municipality: Yüksekova
- Population (2023): 851
- Time zone: UTC+3 (TRT)

Dedeler (Kurdish: Zîzan; Syriac: Zīzan) (Note: Alternatively transliterated as Zeezan.) is a neighborhood in Yüksekova in Yüksekova District of Hakkâri Province in Turkey. It is populated by Kurds of the Dirî tribe and had a population of 851 in 2023. Dedeler was a village until 2023.

== History ==
Zīzan (today called Dedeler) was inhabited by 21 Assyrian families in 1850, all of whom were adherents of the Church of the East and were served by one priest and one church as part of the diocese of Gāwār according to the English missionary George Percy Badger. The population had increased to 30 families by 1877 when visited by Edward Lewes Cutts. The village was destroyed by the Ottoman Army in 1915 amidst the Sayfo.

== Population ==
Population history from 1997 to 2023:

Population
Year	Pop.	±%
1997	656	—
2007	991	+51.1%
2012	951	−4.0%
2017	923	−2.9%
2022	880	−4.7%
2023	851	−3.3%

== Bibliography ==
- Aboona, Hirmis (2008). Assyrians, Kurds, and Ottomans: Intercommunal Relations on the Periphery of the Ottoman Empire. Cambria Press.
- Badger, George Percy (1852). The Nestorians and Their Rituals: With the Narrative of a Mission to Mesopotamia and Coordistan in 1842-1844, and of a Late Visit to Those Countries in 1850; Also, Researches Into the Present Condition of the Syrian Jacobites, Papal Syrians, and Chaldeans, and an Inquiry Into the Religious Tenets of the Yezeedees. Vol. 1.
- Wilmshurst, David (2000). The Ecclesiastical Organisation of the Church of the East, 1318–1913. Peeters Publishers.
- Yacoub, Joseph (2016). Year of the Sword: The Assyrian Christian Genocide, A History. Translated by James Ferguson. Oxford University Press.
