= Beşbulak, Yüksekova =

Neighborhood in Yüksekova, Turkey

Beşbulak
- Neighbourhood
- Location in Turkey
- Coordinates: 37.527°N 44.359°E
- Country: Turkey
- Province: Hakkâri
- District: Yüksekova
- Municipality: Yüksekova
- Population (2023): 575
- Time zone: UTC+3 (TRT)

Beşbulak (Syriac: Dārā, Kurdish: Dara) is a neighborhood in Yüksekova in Yüksekova District of Hakkâri Province in Turkey. It is populated by Kurds of the Dirî tribe and had a population of 575 in 2023.

Beşbulak was a village until 2023.

== History ==
The village was populated by 13 Assyrian families in 1850 and 5 families in 1877.

== Population ==
Population history of the village from 2014 to 2023:

Population
Year	Pop.	±%
2014	605	—
2017	586	−3.1%
2022	557	−4.9%
2023	575	+3.2%
