= Akçalı, Yüksekova =

Village in Hakkari Province, Turkey

Akçalı
- Village
- Location within Turkey
- Coordinates: 37.597°N 44.210°E
- Country: Turkey
- Province: Hakkâri
- District: Yüksekova
- Population (2023): 436
- Time zone: UTC+3 (TRT)

Akçalı (Kurdish: Kertinîs, Syriac: Kartīnes) is a village in Yüksekova District in Hakkâri Province in Turkey. The village is populated by Kurds of the Pinyanişî tribe and had a population of 436 in 2023.

== Population ==
Population history from 1997 to 2023:

Population
Year	Pop.	±%
1997	496	—
2007	577	+16.3%
2012	507	−12.1%
2017	479	−5.5%
2022	448	−6.5%
2023	436	−2.7%
