= Doluçay, Adaklı =

Village in Bingöl Province, Turkey

Doluçay
- Village
- Location within Turkey
- Coordinates: 39.155°N 40.633°E
- Country: Turkey
- Province: Bingöl
- District: Adaklı
- Population (2021): 90
- Time zone: UTC+3 (TRT)

Doluçay (Kurdish: Saxyan) is a village in the Adaklı District, Bingöl Province, Turkey. The village is populated by Kurds of the Hormek tribe and had a population of 90 in 2021.

The hamlet of Beyaztaş is attached to the village.
