= Deralok Dam =

Rashava-Deralok Dam
- Location within Iraq
- Country: Iraq
- Location: Deraluk, Dohuk Governorate, Kurdistan Region
- Coordinates: 37°4′17″N 43°39′29″E
- Purpose: Power, flood control
- Status: Under construction
- Construction began: October 2016
- Opening date: 2020 (est.)
- Construction cost: $168 million
- Owner: Kurdistan Regional Government

Dam and spillways
- Type of dam: Gravity, diversion weir
- Impounds: Great Zab
- Height: 30 m (98 ft)
- Height (foundation): 29 m
- Height (thalweg): 26 m
- Length: 119 m (390 ft)
- Elevation at crest: 640 m
- Width (crest): 5.5 m
- Dam volume: 200,000 m^{3}

Deralok Hydropower Station
- Commission date: 2020 (est.)
- Type: Run-of-the-river
- Hydraulic head: 17 m
- Turbines: 2 x 18.8 MW Kaplan-type
- Installed capacity: 37.6 MW

The Rashava-Deralok Dam is a gravity dam currently being constructed on the Great Zab River, just upstream of the town of Deralok in Dohuk Governorate, Kurdistan region of Iraq. The dam will support a 37.6 MW run-of-the-river hydroelectric power station, with the primary purpose to address continued power shortfalls in the region, most precisely to supply the towns of Amadiya and Badinan.

According to Kurdish Prime Minister Nechirvan Barzani, it is the first hydropower project launched by the Kurdistan Regional Government.

== Contractors ==
The contract to build the dam and power station was awarded to a Boland Payeh - Farab (two iranian construction companies) joint-venture. It is being financed and supervised by the Japan International Cooperation Agency. A signing ceremony was held in December 2013. The total cost of the project is estimated at $168 million, including $129 million for the dam itself, the remaining consisting in the construction of a 132 kV transmission line and substation, completed in a first stage.

== Timeline ==
Kurdish Prime Minister inaugurated the project in November 2015, but construction of the dam actually began in October 2016. The project is expected to be complete in 2020.
