= Bulaklı, Yüksekova =

Village in Hakkari Province, Turkey

Bulaklı
- Village
- Location within Turkey
- Coordinates: 37.515°N 44.182°E
- Country: Turkey
- Province: Hakkâri
- District: Yüksekova
- Population (2023): 206
- Time zone: UTC+3 (TRT)

Bulaklı (Kurdish: Memkan, Syriac: Memekkan) is a village in the Yüksekova District of Hakkâri Province in Turkey. The village is populated by Kurds of Doski and Oramar tribes and had a population of 206 in 2023.

== History ==
The village of Bulaklı was previously Assyrian until Sayfo and was bought from the central government by Kurds from different tribal backgrounds creating a mixed tribally-composed village. The village was populated by 13 Assyrian families in 1850 and 17 families in 1877.

== Population ==
Population history from 2007 to 2023:

Population
Year	Pop.	±%
2007	252	—
2010	314	+24.6%
2015	291	−7.3%
2020	276	−5.2%
2023	206	−25.4%
