= Kabaçalı, Adaklı =

Village in Bingöl Province, Turkey

Kabaçalı
- Village
- Location within Turkey
- Coordinates: 39.125°N 40.644°E
- Country: Turkey
- Province: Bingöl
- District: Adaklı
- Population (2021): 17
- Time zone: UTC+3 (TRT)

Kabaçalı (Kurdish: Perican) is a village in the Adaklı District, Bingöl Province, Turkey. The village is populated by Kurds of the Hormek tribe and had a population of 17 in 2021.

The hamlet of Tosunlu is attached to the village.
