= Yoncalık, Yüksekova =

Village in Hakkari Province, Turkey

Yoncalık
- Village
- Location within Turkey
- Coordinates: 37.518°N 44.295°E
- Country: Turkey
- Province: Hakkâri
- District: Yüksekova
- Population (2023): 432
- Time zone: UTC+3 (TRT)

Yoncalık (Kurdish: Pîrzalan, Syriac: Pirzālan) is a village in the Yüksekova District of Hakkâri Province in Turkey. The village is populated by Kurds of the Dirî and Pinyanişî tribes and had a population of 432 in 2023.

The hamlet of Çakırca, Çevreli (Çardîwar, Qardiwār) and Kuruköy are attached to Yoncalık.

== History ==
Missionary Samuel Audley Rhea visited the village during his trips to Kurdistan which Dwight Whitney Marsh wrote about in the book "The Tennesseean in Persia and Koordistan" published in 1869.

The village was populated by 28 Assyrian families in 1850 and 60 families in 1877.

=== Population history ===
Population history from 2007 to 2023:

Population
Year	Pop.	±%
2007	924	—
2010	980	+6.1%
2015	462	−52.9%
2020	461	−0.2%
2023	432	−6.3%
