= Yeldeğirmeni, Adaklı =

Village in Bingöl Province, Turkey

Yeldeğirmeni
- Village
- Location within Turkey
- Coordinates: 39.275°N 40.425°E
- Country: Turkey
- Province: Bingöl
- District: Adaklı
- Population (2021): 59
- Time zone: UTC+3 (TRT)

Yeldeğirmeni (Kurdish: Zermek) is a village in the Adaklı District, Bingöl Province, Turkey. The village is populated by Kurds of the Xiran tribe and had a population of 59 in 2021.
