= Aktaş, Adaklı =

Village in Bingöl Province, Turkey

Aktaş
- Village
- Location within Turkey
- Coordinates: 39.288°N 40.622°E
- Country: Turkey
- Province: Bingöl
- District: Adaklı
- Population (2021): 99
- Time zone: UTC+3 (TRT)

Aktaş (Kurdish: Axtaş) is a village in the Adaklı District, Bingöl Province, Turkey. The village is populated by Kurds of the Şadiyan tribe and had a population of 99 in 2021.

The hamlet of Direkli is attached to the village.
