= Onbaşılar, Yüksekova =

Village in Hakkari Province, Turkey

Onbaşılar
- Village
- Location within Turkey
- Coordinates: 37.539°N 44.544°E
- Country: Turkey
- Province: Hakkâri
- District: Yüksekova
- Population (2023): 945
- Time zone: UTC+3 (TRT)

Onbaşılar (Kurdish: Hirmîn) is a village in the Yüksekova District of Hakkâri Province in Turkey. The village is populated by Kurds of the Dirî tribe and had a population of 945 in 2023.

The hamlets of Ağaçlı (Alyawa), Ağılcık (Kendolak), Armutlu (Mutirban), Çamdalı (Meşkan), Çobanpınarı (Wargenima), Dereiçi (Deraw) and Sarıkaya (Serişkevtê) are attached to it.

== Population ==
Population history from 1997 to 2023:

Population
Year	Pop.	±%
1997	753	—
2007	746	−0.9%
2012	874	+17.2%
2017	1,047	+19.8%
2022	1,047	+0.0%
2023	945	−9.7%
