= Bostancık, Yüksekova =

Village in Hakkari Province, Turkey

Bostancık
- Village
- Location within Turkey
- Coordinates: 37.445°N 44.205°E
- Country: Turkey
- Province: Hakkâri
- District: Yüksekova
- Population (2023): 522
- Time zone: UTC+3 (TRT)

Bostancık (Kurdish: Gulord) is a village in the Yüksekova District of Hakkâri Province in Turkey. The village is populated by Kurds of the Doski tribe and had a population of 522 in 2023.

The village once had a population of around 400 households but was evacuated due to the Kurdish–Turkish conflict. Some locals have since then returned to the village.

== Population ==
Population history from 1997 to 2023:

Population
Year	Pop.	±%
1997	247	—
2008	64	−74.1%
2012	103	+60.9%
2017	44	−57.3%
2022	122	+177.3%
2023	522	+327.9%
