= Elmadüzü, Adaklı =

Village in Bingöl Province, Turkey

Elmadüzü
- Village
- Location within Turkey
- Coordinates: 39.234°N 40.713°E
- Country: Turkey
- Province: Bingöl
- District: Adaklı
- Population (2021): 303
- Time zone: UTC+3 (TRT)

Elmadüzü (Kurdish: Feruz) is a village in the Adaklı District, Bingöl Province, Turkey. The village is populated by Kurds and had a population of 303 in 2021.
