= Sürekli, Yüksekova =

Village in Hakkari Province, Turkey

Sürekli
- Village
- Location within Turkey
- Coordinates: 37.427°N 44.148°E
- Country: Turkey
- Province: Hakkâri
- District: Yüksekova
- Population (2023): 113
- Time zone: UTC+3 (TRT)

Sürekli (Kurdish: Bêsitkê) is a village in the Yüksekova District of Hakkâri Province in Turkey. The village is populated by Kurds of the Doski tribe and had a population of 113 in 2023.

Sürekli has the three hamlets of Dağlıca, Erbaş and Tarlacık attached to it.

== Population ==
Population history from 2014 to 2023:

Population
| Year | Pop. | ±% |
|---|---|---|
| 2014 | 34 | — |
| 2015 | 30 | −11.8% |
| 2020 | 125 | +316.7% |
| 2023 | 113 | −9.6% |
