= Elmaağaç, Adaklı =

Village in Bingöl Province, Turkey

Elmaağaç
- Village
- Location within Turkey
- Coordinates: 39.174°N 40.623°E
- Country: Turkey
- Province: Bingöl
- District: Adaklı
- Population (2021): 55
- Time zone: UTC+3 (TRT)

Elmaağaç (Kurdish: Maskan) is a village in the Adaklı District, Bingöl Province, Turkey. The village is populated by Kurds of the Hormek tribe and had a population of 55 in 2021.

The hamlets of Çakmak, Keloşk, Meskan and Tanyan are attached to the village.
