= Köşkönü, Yüksekova =

Village in Hakkari Province, Turkey

Köşkönü
- Village
- Location within Turkey
- Coordinates: 37.426°N 44.155°E
- Country: Turkey
- Province: Hakkâri
- District: Yüksekova
- Population (2023): 350
- Time zone: UTC+3 (TRT)

Köşkönü (Kurdish: Piştqesr) is a village in the Yüksekova District of Hakkâri Province in Turkey. The village is populated by Kurds of the Doski tribe and had a population of 350 in 2023.

The hamlets of Ağıllar (Page), Kurucak (Kaniyê Xecê), Ortakçı, Sarıtaş and Taşyazı are attached to Köşkönü.

== Population ==
Population history from 1997 to 2023:

Population
Year	Pop.	±%
1997	267	—
2007	321	+20.2%
2012	346	+7.8%
2017	274	−20.8%
2023	350	+27.7%
