= Kozlu, Adaklı =

Village in Bingöl Province, Turkey

Kozlu
- Village
- Location within Turkey
- Coordinates: 39°10′10″N 40°31′2″E
- Country: Turkey
- Province: Bingöl
- District: Adaklı
- Population (2021): 245
- Time zone: UTC+3 (TRT)

Kozlu (Kurdish: Koz) is a village in the Adaklı District, Bingöl Province, Turkey. The village is populated by Kurds of the Şadiyan tribe and had a population of 245 in 2021.

The hamlets of Boç, Gözütek and Kömür are attached to the village.
