= Tuğlu, Yüksekova =

Village in Hakkari Province, Turkey

Tuğlu
- Village
- Location within Turkey
- Coordinates: 37.42°N 44.153°E
- Country: Turkey
- Province: Hakkâri
- District: Yüksekova
- Population (2023): 304
- Time zone: UTC+3 (TRT)

Tuğlu (Kurdish: Haciyan) is a village in the Yüksekova District of Hakkâri Province in Turkey. The village is populated by Kurds of the Doski tribe and had a population of 304 in 2023.

The hamlets of Çayır (Mêrgan) and Karakaş (Rezkî) are attached to Tuğlu.

== Population ==
Population history from 2007 to 2023:

Population
Year	Pop.	±%
2007	323	—
2010	318	−1.5%
2015	223	−29.9%
2020	205	−8.1%
2023	304	+48.3%
