= Dilektaşı, Yüksekova =

Village in Hakkari Province, Turkey

Dilektaşı
- Village
- Location within Turkey
- Coordinates: 37.688°N 44.159°E
- Country: Turkey
- Province: Hakkâri
- District: Yüksekova
- Population (2023): 723
- Time zone: UTC+3 (TRT)

Dilektaşı (Kurdish: Manîs) is a village in the Yüksekova District of Hakkâri Province in Turkey. The village is populated by Kurds of the Pinyanişî tribe and had a population of 723 in 2023.

The hamlet of Çalımlı (Dizberan) is attached to it.

== Population ==
Population history from 1997 to 2023:

Population
| Year | Pop. | ±% |
|---|---|---|
| 1997 | 703 | — |
| 2007 | 800 | +13.8% |
| 2012 | 908 | +13.5% |
| 2017 | 803 | −11.6% |
| 2022 | 731 | −9.0% |
| 2023 | 723 | −1.1% |
