= Suüstü, Yüksekova =

Village in Hakkari Province, Turkey

Suüstü
- Village
- Location within Turkey
- Coordinates: 37.611°N 44.138°E
- Country: Turkey
- Province: Hakkâri
- District: Yüksekova
- Population (2023): 656
- Time zone: UTC+3 (TRT)

Suüstü (Kurdish: Şakîtan) is a village in the Yüksekova District of Hakkâri Province in Turkey. The village is populated by Kurds of the Pinyanişî tribe and had a population of 656 in 2023.

== Population ==
Population history from 2007 to 2023:

Population
Year	Pop.	±%
2007	623	—
2010	722	+15.9%
2015	716	−0.8%
2020	726	+1.4%
2023	656	−9.6%
