= Pınargözü, Yüksekova =

Village in Hakkari Province, Turkey

Pınargözü
- Village
- Location within Turkey
- Coordinates: 37.436°N 44.139°E
- Country: Turkey
- Province: Hakkâri
- District: Yüksekova
- Population (2023): 767
- Time zone: UTC+3 (TRT)

Pınargözü (Kurdish: Xelkan) is a village in the Yüksekova District of Hakkâri Province in Turkey. The village is populated by Kurds of the Doski tribe and had a population of 767 in 2023.

The three unpopulated hamlets of Inceyol (Ayir), Kışlacık (Baştazin) and Yeşilce (Mergî) are attached to Pınargözü.

== Population ==
Population history from 2007 to 2023:

Population
Year	Pop.	±%
2007	213	—
2010	229	+7.5%
2015	416	+81.7%
2020	365	−12.3%
2023	767	+110.1%
