= Sarıtaş, Yüksekova =

Village in Hakkari Province, Turkey

Sarıtaş
- Village
- Location within Turkey
- Coordinates: 37.634°N 44.368°E
- Country: Turkey
- Province: Hakkâri
- District: Yüksekova
- Population (2023): 588
- Time zone: UTC+3 (TRT)

Sarıtaş (Kurdish: Dirbêsan) is a village in the Yüksekova District of Hakkâri Province in Turkey. The village is populated by Kurds of the Ertoşî and Mamxuran tribes and had a population of 588 in 2023.

The hamlet of Yemişli (Dotkan) is attached to it.

== Population ==
Population history from 2015 to 2023:

Population
Year	Pop.	±%
2015	711	—
2020	600	−15.6%
2023	588	−2.0%
