= Aşağıuluyol, Yüksekova =

Village in Hakkari Province, Turkey

Aşağıuluyol
- Village
- Location within Turkey
- Coordinates: 37.501°N 44.413°E
- Country: Turkey
- Province: Hakkâri
- District: Yüksekova
- Population (2023): 769
- Time zone: UTC+3 (TRT)

Aşağıuluyol (Kurdish: Tiloran) is a village in Yüksekova District in Hakkâri Province in Turkey. The village is populated by Kurds of the Dirî tribe and had a population of 769 in 2023.

== Population ==
Population history from 2007 to 2023:

Population
Year	Pop.	±%
2007	798	—
2012	888	+11.3%
2017	899	+1.2%
2022	748	−16.8%
2023	769	+2.8%
