= Değerli, Yüksekova =

Village in Hakkari Province, Turkey

Değerli
- Village
- Location within Turkey
- Coordinates: 37.557°N 44.399°E
- Country: Turkey
- Province: Hakkâri
- District: Yüksekova
- Population (2023): 1,068
- Time zone: UTC+3 (TRT)

Değerli (Kurdish: Memkava, Syriac: Māken Āwā) is a village in the Yüksekova District of Hakkâri Province in Turkey. It is populated by Kurds of the Dirî tribe and had a population of 1,068 in 2023.

== History ==
It was populated by 13 Assyrian families in 1850 and 17 families in 1877.

== Population ==
Population history from 1997 to 2023:

Population
Year	Pop.	±%
1997	873	—
2007	1,097	+25.7%
2012	1,205	+9.8%
2017	1,134	−5.9%
2022	1,065	−6.1%
2023	1,068	+0.3%
