= Topağaçlar, Adaklı =

Village in Bingöl Province, Turkey

Topağaçlar
- Village
- Location within Turkey
- Coordinates: 39.208°N 40.448°E
- Country: Turkey
- Province: Bingöl
- District: Adaklı
- Population (2021): 109
- Time zone: UTC+3 (TRT)

Topağaçlar (Kurdish: Dizmoru) is a village in the Adaklı District, Bingöl Province, Turkey. The village is populated by Kurds of the Şadiyan and Canbegan tribes and had a population of 109 in 2021.

The hamlet of Dizmori yaylası are attached to the village.
