= Kazan, Yüksekova =

Village in Hakkari Province, Turkey

Kazan
- Village
- Location within Turkey
- Coordinates: 37.697°N 44.236°E
- Country: Turkey
- Province: Hakkâri
- District: Yüksekova
- Population (2023): 436
- Time zone: UTC+3 (TRT)

Kazan (Kurdish: Tawani) is a village in the Yüksekova District of Hakkâri Province in Turkey. The village had a population of 436 in 2023.

A flood hit the village in August 2017, causing damage to its homes, vineyards, clover fields, and wheat fields in the village.

== Population ==
Population history from 2010 to 2023:

Population
Year	Pop.	±%
2010	609	—
2012	592	−2.8%
2017	536	−9.5%
2022	433	−19.2%
2023	436	+0.7%
