= Güldalı, Yüksekova =

Village in Hakkari Province, Turkey

Güldalı
- Village
- Location within Turkey
- Coordinates: 37.72°N 44.460°E
- Country: Turkey
- Province: Hakkâri
- District: Yüksekova
- Population (2023): 389
- Time zone: UTC+3 (TRT)

Güldalı (Kurdish: Bilinbasan, Syriac: Bāsan) is a village in the Yüksekova District of Hakkâri Province in Turkey. The village had a population of 389 in 2023.

== History ==
The village was populated by 14 Assyrian families in 1850, while no Assyrians were recorded in 1877.

== Population ==
Population history from 1997 to 2023:

Population
Year	Pop.	±%
1997	433	—
2007	453	+4.6%
2012	478	+5.5%
2017	415	−13.2%
2022	377	−9.2%
2023	389	+3.2%
