= Ortaç, Yüksekova =

Village in Hakkari Province, Turkey

Ortaç
- Village
- Location within Turkey
- Coordinates: 37.675°N 44.047°E
- Country: Turkey
- Province: Hakkâri
- District: Yüksekova
- Population (2023): 893
- Time zone: UTC+3 (TRT)

Ortaç (Kurdish: Bawenîs) is a village in the Yüksekova District of Hakkâri Province in Turkey. The village is populated by Kurds of the Pinyanişî tribe and had a population of 893 in 2023.

The hamlets of Dallıca, Gümüşlü (Zêwe), Kapılı (Derîs), Kargılı (Sîsar) and Konak (Simehîlk) are attached to it.

== Population ==
Population history from 1997 to 2023:

Population
Year	Pop.	±%
1997	748	—
2007	969	+29.5%
2012	1,102	+13.7%
2017	1,011	−8.3%
2022	930	−8.0%
2023	893	−4.0%
