= Mercan, Adaklı =

Village in Bingöl Province, Turkey

Mercan
- Village
- Location within Turkey
- Coordinates: 39.225°N 40.635°E
- Country: Turkey
- Province: Bingöl
- District: Adaklı
- Population (2021): 195
- Time zone: UTC+3 (TRT)

Mercan is a village in the Adaklı District, Bingöl Province, Turkey. The village is populated by Kurds of the Şadiyan tribe and had a population of 195 in 2021.

The hamlets of Ayranlı, Çarıklı, Çomak, İkiz, Kereşan, Kustüyon, Merzon yaylası, Şehit, Taşevler, Yukarımercan and Zabık are attached to the village.
