= Kamışgölü, Adaklı =

Village in Bingöl Province, Turkey

Kamışgölü
- Village
- Location within Turkey
- Coordinates: 39.212°N 40.432°E
- Country: Turkey
- Province: Bingöl
- District: Adaklı
- Population (2021): 107
- Time zone: UTC+3 (TRT)

Kamışgölü (Kurdish: Tumik) is a village in the Adaklı District, Bingöl Province, Turkey. The village is populated by Kurds of the Şadiyan tribe and had a population of 107 in 2021.
