= Yürekli, Yüksekova =

Village in Hakkari Province, Turkey

Yürekli
- Village
- Location within Turkey
- Coordinates: 37.425°N 44.397°E
- Country: Turkey
- Province: Hakkâri
- District: Yüksekova
- Population (2023): 279
- Time zone: UTC+3 (TRT)

Yürekli (Kurdish: Herînk) is a village in the Yüksekova District of Hakkâri Province in Turkey. The village had a population of 279 in 2023.

== Population ==
Population history from 2007 to 2023:

Population
Year	Pop.	±%
2007	307	—
2010	332	+8.1%
2015	336	+1.2%
2020	327	−2.7%
2023	279	−14.7%
