= Dilekli, Yüksekova =

Village in Hakkari Province, Turkey

Dilekli
- Village
- Location within Turkey
- Coordinates: 37.329°N 43.961°E
- Country: Turkey
- Province: Hakkâri
- District: Yüksekova
- Population (2023): 5
- Time zone: UTC+3 (TRT)

Dilekli (Kurdish: Şuke) is a village in the Yüksekova District of Hakkâri Province in Turkey close to the border to Iraq. The village is populated by Kurds of the Oramar tribe and had a population of 5 in 2023.

The unpopulated hamlet of Dibecik (Birye) is attached to Dilekli. The two unpopulated settlements of Pirinçeken (Kinyaniş) and Mezruk (Rezuk) can also be found south of the village. Pirinçeken was also an Oramar village.

== Population ==
Population history from 1965 to 2023:

Population
Year	Pop.	±%
1965	550	—
1970	622	+13.1%
1997	0	−100.0%
2007	2,140	—
2012	2	−99.9%
2017	0	−100.0%
2022	4	—
2023	5	+25.0%
