= Kısıklı, Yüksekova =

Village in Hakkari Province, Turkey

Kısıklı
- Village
- Location within Turkey
- Coordinates: 37.687°N 44.375°E
- Country: Turkey
- Province: Hakkâri
- District: Yüksekova
- Population (2023): 1,187
- Time zone: UTC+3 (TRT)

Kısıklı (Kurdish: Dêlezî) is a village in the Yüksekova District of Hakkâri Province in Turkey. The village is populated by Kurds of the Dirî tribe and had a population of 1,187 in 2023.

The hamlets of Aşağıgüveç (Xurekana jêri), Dereiçi and Sualtı (Dirîşk) are attached to the village.

== Population ==
Population history from 1997 to 2023:

Population
Year	Pop.	±%
1997	1,841	—
2007	1,966	+6.8%
2012	2,099	+6.8%
2017	1,357	−35.4%
2022	1,221	−10.0%
2023	1,187	−2.8%
