= Sarıdibek, Adaklı =

Village in Bingöl Province, Turkey

Sarıdibek
- Village
- Location within Turkey
- Coordinates: 39.138°N 40.656°E
- Country: Turkey
- Province: Bingöl
- District: Adaklı
- Population (2021): 57
- Time zone: UTC+3 (TRT)

Sarıdibek (Kurdish: Korkan) is a village in the Adaklı District, Bingöl Province, Turkey. The village is populated by Kurds of the Hormek tribe and had a population of 57 in 2021.

The hamlets of Çakır, Çiçeklim, Dağlıca, Gözecik and Koşar mezrası are attached to the village.
