= Erler, Adaklı =

Village in Bingöl Province, Turkey

Erler
- Village
- Location within Turkey
- Coordinates: 39.166°N 40.549°E
- Country: Turkey
- Province: Bingöl
- District: Adaklı
- Population (2021): 131
- Time zone: UTC+3 (TRT)

Erler (Kurdish: Kurdan) is a village in the Adaklı District, Bingöl Province, Turkey. The village is populated by Kurds of the Hormek tribe and had a population of 131 in 2021.

The hamlet of Kürdan yaylası is attached to the village.
