= Aysaklı, Adaklı =

Village in Bingöl Province, Turkey

Aysaklı
- Village
- Location within Turkey
- Coordinates: 39.310°N 40.455°E
- Country: Turkey
- Province: Bingöl
- District: Adaklı
- Population (2021): 65
- Time zone: UTC+3 (TRT)

Aysaklı (Kurdish: Înaq) is a village in the Adaklı District, Bingöl Province, Turkey. The village is populated by Kurds of the Şadiyan tribe and had a population of 65 in 2021.

The hamlets of Bayırlı, Yaylakonak and Yazıcı are attached to the village.
