= Kamışlı, Yüksekova =

Village in Hakkari Province, Turkey

Kamışlı
- Village
- Location within Turkey
- Coordinates: 37.459°N 44.309°E
- Country: Turkey
- Province: Hakkâri
- District: Yüksekova
- Population (2023): 1,099
- Time zone: UTC+3 (TRT)

Kamışlı (Kurdish: Sînava, Syriac: Sīnāwā) is a village in the Yüksekova District of Hakkâri Province in Turkey. The village is populated by Kurds of the Geravî tribe and had a population of 1,099 in 2023.

== History ==
The village was populated by 16 Assyrian families in 1850 and 12 families in 1877.

== Population ==
Population history from 2007 to 2023:

Population
Year	Pop.	±%
2007	1,125	—
2012	1,266	+12.5%
2017	1,254	−0.9%
2022	1,107	−11.7%
2023	1,099	−0.7%
