= Karlı, Yüksekova =

Village in Hakkari Province, Turkey

Karlı
- Village
- Location within Turkey
- Coordinates: 37.496°N 44.239°E
- Country: Turkey
- Province: Hakkâri
- District: Yüksekova
- Population (2023): 1,239
- Time zone: UTC+3 (TRT)

Karlı (Kurdish: Befircan) is a village in the Yüksekova District of Hakkâri Province in Turkey. The village is populated by Kurds of the Doski tribe and had a population of 1,239 in 2023.

The hamlets of Bakırlı, Beşpınar (Badawa), Çaylı, Çiceközü (Gevrik), Çimenli, Karabağ (Xirwateng) and Kilimli (Member) are attached to the village.

== Population ==
Population history from 1997 to 2023:

Population
Year	Pop.	±%
1997	2,907	—
2007	1,175	−59.6%
2012	1,340	+14.0%
2017	1,196	−10.7%
2022	1,064	−11.0%
2023	1,239	+16.4%
