= Çatma, Yüksekova =

Village in Hakkari Province, Turkey

Çatma
- Village
- Location within Turkey
- Coordinates: 37.483°N 44.268°E
- Country: Turkey
- Province: Hakkâri
- District: Yüksekova
- Population (2023): 547
- Time zone: UTC+3 (TRT)

Çatma (Kurdish: Sûsyan) is a village in the Yüksekova District of Hakkâri Province in Turkey. The village is populated by Kurds of the Doski tribe and had a population of 547 in 2023.

== Population ==
Population history from 1997 to 2023:

Population
Year	Pop.	±%
1997	342	—
2007	344	+0.6%
2012	407	+18.3%
2017	349	−14.3%
2022	328	−6.0%
2023	547	+66.8%
