= Cevizli, Adaklı =

Village in Bingöl Province, Turkey

Cevizli
- Village
- Location within Turkey
- Coordinates: 39.317°N 40.442°E
- Country: Turkey
- Province: Bingöl
- District: Adaklı
- Population (2021): 12
- Time zone: UTC+3 (TRT)

Cevizli (Kurdish: Perteg) is a village in the Adaklı District, Bingöl Province, Turkey. The village is populated by Kurds of the Şadiyan tribe and had a population of 12 in 2021.

The hamlet of Çevrecik is attached to the village.
