= Bağlarpınarı, Adaklı =

Village in Bingöl Province, Turkey

Bağlarpınarı
- Village
- Location within Turkey
- Coordinates: 39.245°N 40.394°E
- Country: Turkey
- Province: Bingöl
- District: Adaklı
- Population (2021): 195
- Time zone: UTC+3 (TRT)

Bağlarpınarı (Kurdish: Temran) is a village in the Adaklı District, Bingöl Province, Turkey. The village is populated by Kurds of the Şadiyan tribe and had a population of 195 in 2021.
