= Kadıköy, Yüksekova =

Village in Hakkari Province, Turkey

Kadıköy
- Village
- Location within Turkey
- Coordinates: 37.500°N 44.214°E
- Country: Turkey
- Province: Hakkâri
- District: Yüksekova
- Population (2023): 1,109
- Time zone: UTC+3 (TRT)

Kadıköy (Kurdish: Qadyan, Syriac: Qādiyan) is a village in the Yüksekova District of Hakkâri Province in Turkey. The village is populated by Kurds of the Pinyanişî tribe and had a population of 1,109 in 2023.

The two hamlets of Kalemli (Xalîdawa) and Mamak (Manûnan) are attached to Kadıköy.

== History ==
The village was populated by 30 Assyrian families in 1850 and 6 families in 1877.

== Population ==
Population history from 1997 to 2023:

Population
Year	Pop.	±%
1997	853	—
2007	1,127	+32.1%
2012	1,207	+7.1%
2017	1,237	+2.5%
2022	1,144	−7.5%
2023	1,109	−3.1%
