= Tatlı, Yüksekova =

Village in Hakkari Province, Turkey

Tatlı
- Village
- Location within Turkey
- Coordinates: 37.705°N 44.025°E
- Country: Turkey
- Province: Hakkâri
- District: Yüksekova
- Population (2023): 23
- Time zone: UTC+3 (TRT)

Tatlı (Kurdish: Bîyan) is a village in the Yüksekova District of Hakkâri Province in Turkey. The village is populated by Kurds of the Pinyanişî tribe and had a population of 23 in 2023.

== Population ==
Population history from 2007 to 2023:

Population
Year	Pop.	±%
2007	49	—
2010	40	−18.4%
2015	35	−12.5%
2020	29	−17.1%
2023	23	−20.7%
