= Gökyurt, Yüksekova =

Village in Hakkari Province, Turkey

Gökyurt
- Village
- Location within Turkey
- Coordinates: 37.708°N 44.119°E
- Country: Turkey
- Province: Hakkâri
- District: Yüksekova
- Population (2023): 535
- Time zone: UTC+3 (TRT)

Gökyurt (Kurdish: Tekurawa) is a village in the Yüksekova District of Hakkâri Province in Turkey. The village is populated by Kurds of the Pinyanişi tribe and had a population of 535 in 2023.

It is a former Assyrian settlement.

== Population ==
Population history from 1997 to 2023:

Population
Year	Pop.	±%
1997	437	—
2007	603	+38.0%
2012	636	+5.5%
2017	561	−11.8%
2022	545	−2.9%
2023	535	−1.8%
