= Altınevler, Adaklı =

Village in Bingöl Province, Turkey

Altınevler
- Village
- Location within Turkey
- Coordinates: 39.132°N 40.629°E
- Country: Turkey
- Province: Bingöl
- District: Adaklı
- Population (2021): 93
- Time zone: UTC+3 (TRT)

Altınevler (Kurdish: Şirnan) is a village in the Adaklı District, Bingöl Province, Turkey. The village is populated by Kurds of the Hormek tribe and had a population of 93 in 2021.
