= Hasbağlar, Adaklı =

Village in Bingöl Province, Turkey

Hasbağlar
- Village
- Location within Turkey
- Coordinates: 39.189°N 40.372°E
- Country: Turkey
- Province: Bingöl
- District: Adaklı
- Population (2021): 413
- Time zone: UTC+3 (TRT)

Hasbağlar (Kurdish: Karmurun) is a village in the Adaklı District, Bingöl Province, Turkey. The village is populated by Kurds of the Şadiyan tribe and had a population of 413 in 2021.

The hamlets of Yukarıkarmurun and Zımak are attached to the village.
