= Sevkar, Adaklı =

Village in Bingöl Province, Turkey

Sevkar
- Village
- Location within Turkey
- Coordinates: 39.274°N 40.578°E
- Country: Turkey
- Province: Bingöl
- District: Adaklı
- Population (2021): 371
- Time zone: UTC+3 (TRT)

Sevkar is a village in the Adaklı District, Bingöl Province, Turkey. The village is populated by Kurds of the Şadiyan tribe and had a population of 371 in 2021.

The hamlets of Arzu, Bahar, Çem, Çiçekli, Dere, Dikmen, Kavak, Mehmet, Sevkor and Yasin are attached to the village.
