= Yeşiltaş, Yüksekova =

Village in Hakkari Province, Turkey

Yeşiltaş
- Village
- Location within Turkey
- Coordinates: 37.418°N 44.105°E
- Country: Turkey
- Province: Hakkâri
- District: Yüksekova
- Population (2023): 670
- Time zone: UTC+3 (TRT)

Yeşiltaş (Kurdish: Şitazin) is a village in the Yüksekova District of Hakkâri Province in Turkey. The village is populated by Kurds of the Oramar tribe and had a population of 670 in 2023.

The hamlets of Çubuklu, Darıca (Serpêl) Kavacık, Kılavuz and Taşalan attached to Yeşiltaş.

== Population ==
Population history from 2007 to 2023:

Population
Year	Pop.	±%
2007	575	—
2010	592	+3.0%
2015	513	−13.3%
2020	812	+58.3%
2023	670	−17.5%
