= Çevreli, Adaklı =

Village in Bingöl Province, Turkey

Çevreli
- Village
- Location within Turkey
- Coordinates: 39.280°N 40.654°E
- Country: Turkey
- Province: Bingöl
- District: Adaklı
- Population (2021): 156
- Time zone: UTC+3 (TRT)

Çevreli (Kurdish: Baluca) is a village in the Adaklı District, Bingöl Province, Turkey. The village is populated by Kurds of the Şadiyan tribe and had a population of 156 in 2021.

The hamlets of Baluco, Çörekçi, Fiseyür, Korkmaz, Tirşo, Uzunpazar and Yoncalık are attached to the village.
