= Boyalı, Adaklı =

Village in Bingöl Province, Turkey

Boyalı
- Village
- Location within Turkey
- Coordinates: 39.139°N 40.522°E
- Country: Turkey
- Province: Bingöl
- District: Adaklı
- Population (2021): 67
- Time zone: UTC+3 (TRT)

Boyalı (Kurdish: Holan) is a village in the Adaklı District, Bingöl Province, Turkey. The village is populated by Kurds of the Maksudan tribe and had a population of 67 in 2021.
