= Kaynakdüzü, Adaklı =

Village in Bingöl Province, Turkey

Kaynakdüzü
- Village
- Location within Turkey
- Coordinates: 39.208°N 40.692°E
- Country: Turkey
- Province: Bingöl
- District: Adaklı
- Population (2021): 279
- Time zone: UTC+3 (TRT)

Kaynakdüzü (Kurdish: Simhaç) is a village in the Adaklı District, Bingöl Province, Turkey. The village is populated by Kurds of the Şadiyan tribe and had a population of 279 in 2021.

The hamlets of Bent, Doğanca, Kantar, Karakoç, Kole, Mendelli, Sırasöğütler and Simhaç yaylası are attached to the village.
