= Karabey, Yüksekova =

Village in Hakkari Province, Turkey

Karabey
- Village
- Location within Turkey
- Coordinates: 37.442°N 44.423°E
- Country: Turkey
- Province: Hakkâri
- District: Yüksekova
- Population (2023): 519
- Time zone: UTC+3 (TRT)

Karabey (Kurdish: Serdeşt, Syriac: Sārdasht) is a village in the Yüksekova District of Hakkâri Province in Turkey. The village had a population of 519 in 2023.

== History ==
The village was populated by 19 Assyrian families in 1850 and 4 families in 1877.

== Population ==
Population history from 1997 to 2023:

Population
Year	Pop.	±%
1997	421	—
2007	553	+31.4%
2012	610	+10.3%
2017	616	+1.0%
2022	508	−17.5%
2023	519	+2.2%
