= Kırkpınar, Adaklı =

Village in Bingöl Province, Turkey

Kırkpınar
- Village
- Location within Turkey
- Coordinates: 39.184°N 40.729°E
- Country: Turkey
- Province: Bingöl
- District: Adaklı
- Population (2021): 82
- Time zone: UTC+3 (TRT)

Kırkpınar (Kurdish: Harik) is a village in the Adaklı District, Bingöl Province, Turkey. The village is populated by Kurds of the Şadiyan tribe and had a population of 82 in 2021.
