= Kolbaşı, Yüksekova =

Village in Hakkari Province, Turkey

Kolbaşı
- Village
- Location within Turkey
- Coordinates: 37.666°N 43.931°E
- Country: Turkey
- Province: Hakkâri
- District: Yüksekova
- Population (2023): 233
- Time zone: UTC+3 (TRT)

Kolbaşı (Kurdish: Şavite, Syriac: Shwāwūṯā) is a village in the Yüksekova District of Hakkâri Province in Turkey. The village had a population of 233 in 2023. The hamlet of Ormanarası (Şervan) is attached to Kolbaşı.

== History ==
The village was populated by 20 Assyrian families in 1850 and 12 families in 1877.

== Population ==
Population history from 1997 to 2023:

Population
Year	Pop.	±%
1997	358	—
2007	367	+2.5%
2012	363	−1.1%
2017	253	−30.3%
2022	231	−8.7%
2023	233	+0.9%
