= Keçili, Yüksekova =

Village in Hakkari Province, Turkey

Keçili
- Village
- Location within Turkey
- Coordinates: 37.659°N 44.251°E
- Country: Turkey
- Province: Hakkâri
- District: Yüksekova
- Population (2023): 350
- Time zone: UTC+3 (TRT)

Keçili (Kurdish: Sorê) is a village in the Yüksekova District of Hakkâri Province in Turkey. The village is populated by Kurds of the Pinyanişî tribe and had a population of 350 in 2023.

== Population ==
Population history from 1997 to 2023:

Population
Year	Pop.	±%
1997	288	—
2007	412	+43.1%
2012	490	+18.9%
2017	432	−11.8%
2022	370	−14.4%
2023	350	−5.4%
