= Bataklık, Yüksekova =

Village in Hakkari Province, Turkey

Bataklık
- Village
- Location within Turkey
- Coordinates: 37.515°N 44.208°E
- Country: Turkey
- Province: Hakkâri
- District: Yüksekova
- Population (2023): 453
- Time zone: UTC+3 (TRT)

Bataklık (Kurdish: Silîwana) is a village in Yüksekova District in Hakkâri Province in Turkey. The village is populated by Kurds of the Doski tribe and had a population of 453 in 2023.

== Population ==
Population history of the village from 2007 to 2023:

Population
| Year | Pop. | ±% |
|---|---|---|
| 2007 | 616 | — |
| 2012 | 619 | +0.5% |
| 2017 | 560 | −9.5% |
| 2022 | 493 | −12.0% |
| 2023 | 453 | −8.1% |
