= Akpınar, Yüksekova =

Village in Hakkari Province, Turkey

Akpınar
- Village
- Location within Turkey
- Coordinates: 37.710°N 44.428°E
- Country: Turkey
- Province: Hakkâri
- District: Yüksekova
- Population (2023): 1,231
- Time zone: UTC+3 (TRT)

Akpınar (Kurdish: Soryan) is a village in Yüksekova District in Hakkâri Province in Turkey. The village is populated by Kurds of the Dirî tribe and had a population of 1,231 in 2023.

The hamlets of Altınbaşak (Zêrêl), Beşevler (Rezûk), Dereiçi (Birdik), Duranlar (Awyan), Kuleli (Gulepir), Okçular and Ovaiçi (Basan) are attached to it.

== Population ==
Population history from 1997 to 2023:

Population
Year	Pop.	±%
1997	1,158	—
2007	1,141	−1.5%
2012	1,305	+14.4%
2017	1,348	+3.3%
2022	1,223	−9.3%
2023	1,231	+0.7%
