= Dolutekne, Adaklı =

Village in Bingöl Province, Turkey

Dolutekne
- Village
- Location within Turkey
- Coordinates: 39.140°N 40.639°E
- Country: Turkey
- Province: Bingöl
- District: Adaklı
- Population (2021): 30
- Time zone: UTC+3 (TRT)

Dolutekne (Kurdish: Yekmal) is a village in the Adaklı District, Bingöl Province, Turkey. The village is populated by Kurds of the Hormek tribe and had a population of 30 in 2021.
