= Karaçubuk, Adaklı =

Village in Bingöl Province, Turkey

Karaçubuk
- Village
- Location within Turkey
- Coordinates: 39.195°N 40.462°E
- Country: Turkey
- Province: Bingöl
- District: Adaklı
- Population (2021): 590
- Time zone: UTC+3 (TRT)

Karaçubuk (Kurdish: Dimlek) is a village in the Adaklı District, Bingöl Province, Turkey. The village is populated by Kurds of the Şadiyan tribe and had a population of 590 in 2021.

The hamlets of Korobaba yaylası and Yeşillik are attached to the village.
