= Örnekköy, Yüksekova =

Village in Hakkari Province, Turkey

Örnekköy
- Village
- Location within Turkey
- Coordinates: 37.468°N 44.388°E
- Country: Turkey
- Province: Hakkâri
- District: Yüksekova
- Population (2023): 409
- Time zone: UTC+3 (TRT)

Örnekköy (Kurdish: Miçîç) is a village in the Yüksekova District of Hakkâri Province in Turkey. The village had a population of 409 in 2023.

== Population ==
Population history from 1997 to 2023:

Population
Year	Pop.	±%
1997	299	—
2007	410	+37.1%
2012	433	+5.6%
2017	425	−1.8%
2022	398	−6.4%
2023	409	+2.8%
