= Gürdere, Yüksekova =

Village in Hakkari Province, Turkey

Gürdere
- Village
- Location within Turkey
- Coordinates: 37.500°N 44.213°E
- Country: Turkey
- Province: Hakkâri
- District: Yüksekova
- Population (2023): 341
- Time zone: UTC+3 (TRT)

Gürdere (Kurdish: Ciwyan) is a village in the Yüksekova District of Hakkâri Province in Turkey. The village is populated by Kurds of the Doski tribe and had a population of 341 in 2023.

The hamlet of Mezran is attached to the village.

== Population ==
Population history from 2007 to 2023:

Population
Year	Pop.	±%
2007	385	—
2012	388	+0.8%
2017	391	+0.8%
2022	342	−12.5%
2023	341	−0.3%
