= Sütlüce, Adaklı =

Village in Bingöl Province, Turkey

Sütlüce
- Village
- Location within Turkey
- Coordinates: 39.122°N 40.660°E
- Country: Turkey
- Province: Bingöl
- District: Adaklı
- Population (2021): 110
- Time zone: UTC+3 (TRT)

Sütlüce (Kurdish: Darebî) is a village in the Adaklı District, Bingöl Province, Turkey. The village is populated by Kurds of the Hormek tribe and had a population of 110 in 2021.

The hamlets of Ağaköy, Akkuş, Çatkuyu, Çavuşlar, Gümüşpınar, Güneyce, Güvercin, Karabudak, Kavak, Komçayırı and Şaban are attached to the village.
