= Akocak, Yüksekova =

Village in Hakkari Province, Turkey

Akocak
- Village
- Location within Turkey
- Coordinates: 37.616°N 44.089°E
- Country: Turkey
- Province: Hakkâri
- District: Yüksekova
- Population (2023): 645
- Time zone: UTC+3 (TRT)

Akocak (Kurdish: Heleyîs) is a village in Yüksekova District in Hakkâri Province in Turkey. The village is populated by Kurds of the Pinyanişî tribe and had a population of 645 in 2023.

The hamlets of Köşk (Koçkê) and Sülük (Sûlkê) are attached to the village.

== Population ==
Population history from 1997 to 2023:

Population
Year	Pop.	±%
1997	566	—
2007	683	+20.7%
2012	732	+7.2%
2017	646	−11.7%
2022	623	−3.6%
2023	645	+3.5%
