= Salkımlı, Yüksekova =

Village in Hakkari Province, Turkey

Salkımlı
- Village
- Location within Turkey
- Coordinates: 37.681°N 44.027°E
- Country: Turkey
- Province: Hakkâri
- District: Yüksekova
- Population (2023): 464
- Time zone: UTC+3 (TRT)

Salkımlı (Kurdish: Niziran) is a village in the Yüksekova District of Hakkâri Province in Turkey. The village is populated by Kurds of the Pinyanişi tribe and had a population of 464 in 2023.

The hamlet of Gürkaynık is attached to Salkımlı.

== Population ==
Population history from 2007 to 2023:

Population
Year	Pop.	±%
2007	213	—
2010	588	+176.1%
2015	540	−8.2%
2020	538	−0.4%
2023	464	−13.8%
