= Bekhme Dam =

Dam in Erbil, Iraq

- Location within Iraq
- Location: Erbil Governorate, Iraq
- Coordinates: 36°42′03″N 44°16′16″E
- Status: Unfinished
- Construction began: 1979
- Construction cost: US$ 1,400,000,000 (to date); US$ 2,600,000,000 (estimated total cost)
- Operator: Ministry of Water Resources

Dam and spillways
- Impounds: Great Zab
- Height: 230 m (750 ft) (planned)
- Length: 600 m (2,000 ft) (planned)

Reservoir
- Total capacity: 17 km^{3} (4.1 cu mi) (planned)
- Surface area: 100 km^{2} (39 sq mi) (planned)

Power Station
- Installed capacity: 1,500 MW (planned)

The Bekhme Dam (Kurdish: بەنداوی بێخمە, Bendava Bêxme) is an unfinished multi-purpose rock-fill dam on the Great Zab 60 kilometres (37 mi) northeast of Erbil, in the Erbil Governorate of Kurdistan Region, Iraq.

The main purposes of the dam would be to produce 1,500 MW of hydro-electricity and to manage flooding. If completed, the 230-metre (750 ft) high Bekhme Dam will be the largest in Iraq. Construction on the dam began in 1979 and was halted during the Iran–Iraq War. Construction started again in 1988 and halted in 1990, prior to the Gulf War. In post-2003 Iraq, the Kurdistan Regional Government began efforts to rebuild the Bekhme Dam.

== Initial construction ==
The Bekhme Dam was planned in the 1950s with a preliminary study done by Harza Engineering Co., and in 1979 and through the early 1980s the project was redesigned by EPDC of Japan. Construction was assigned to a consortium of Turkish-Yugoslavian firms (ENKA Hidrogradnja and Energoprojekt). Construction on the project started in 1987 with access roads, residential camps, construction facilities and the development of quarries and borrow areas. Tunneling and bulk excavation works started in 1988. The works were halted in late 1990 after the UN sanctions due to Iraq's invasion of Kuwait, and with the onset of the Gulf War, as well as consequential poor security environment. By June 1990, the first stage of the construction was complete, the diversion of the Great Zab, facilitated by an incomplete 45-metre (148 ft) high clay core rockfill cofferdam, which was to become part of the upstream shoulder of the main dam, and through two large diversion tunnels.

The dam project involves a large underground power house and transformers chamber, largely completed into the left abutment. The power intake and spillway intake are also located on the left abutment, with associated tunnels through the limestone. Those tunnels emerge through one structure on the left abutment, downstream of the dam, augmented by a plunge pool structure. A system of drainage tunnels was excavated into the left and right abutments at the foot of the main dam. The Bekhme Dam is designed with a central clay core, two upstream and downstream filter zones, and rockfill shoulders (limestone). The upstream and downstream faces of the dam are designed with gradients of 1 vertical to 2.5 horizontal. The dam project was expected to be completed in 1992, resulting in a reservoir with a capacity of 17 cubic kilometres (4.1 cu mi) and a surface area of 100 square kilometres (39 sq mi). There is a potential for a pumped-storage scheme (several gigawatts) to be constructed on the left abutment; that still requires further optimisation and investigation.

Model fo Bekhme Dam by HIROGRADNJA

After the Gulf War, US$175 million worth of equipment were reported to have been stolen by Kurds in the area.

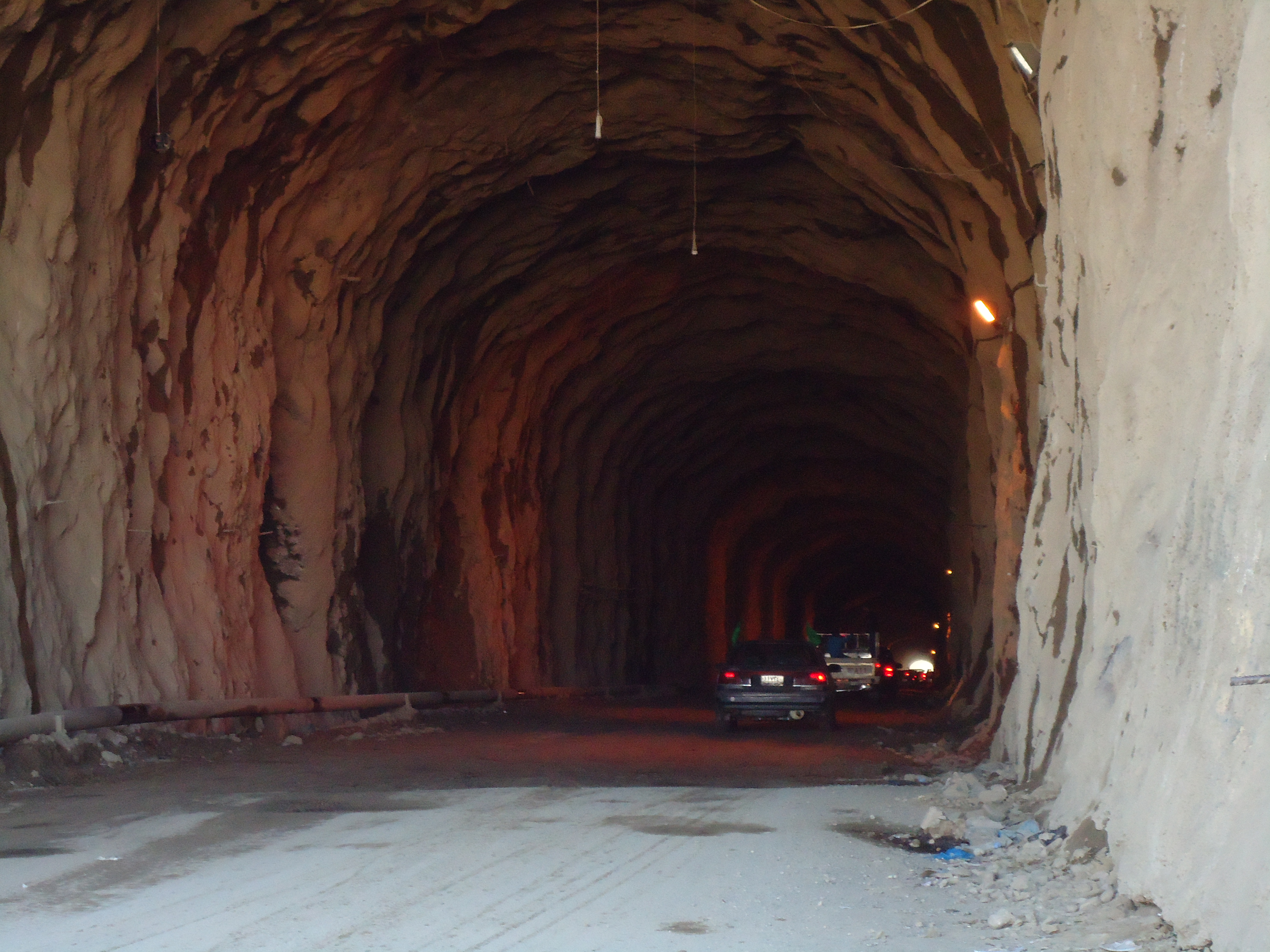
One of the tunnels of Bekhme Dam

== Current project ==
As early as July 2007, the Kurdistan Regional Government has expressed interest in finishing the Bekhme Dam in order to produce hydro-electricity and store needed water. However, with a drought in Iraq, in 2008 the Government of Iraq expressed concern with the Kurdistan Regional Government over dam construction that may lead to water shortages in southern Iraq. In addition, around 20,000 people would be relocated along with the probable flooding of the stone age Shanidar Cave and the 11th century BC village Zawi Chemi Shanidar. Despite this, the need for water storage in Iraq is important and in August 2008, US$33 million was spent on preparatory works for continued construction. The Bekhme Dam's final cost is estimated as US$2.6 billion.
