= Serindere, Yüksekova =

Village in Hakkari Province, Turkey

Serindere
- Village
- Location within Turkey
- Coordinates: 37.666°N 44.405°E
- Country: Turkey
- Province: Hakkâri
- District: Yüksekova
- Population (2023): 318
- Time zone: UTC+3 (TRT)

Serindere (Kurdish: Şîşemzîn) is a village in the Yüksekova District of Hakkâri Province in Turkey. The village is populated by Kurds of the Mamxuran tribe and had a population of 318 in 2023.

== Population ==
Population history from 2007 to 2023:

Population
Year	Pop.	±%
2007	390	—
2010	410	+5.1%
2015	419	+2.2%
2020	375	−10.5%
2023	318	−15.2%
