= Doğankaya, Adaklı =

Village in Bingöl Province, Turkey

Doğankaya
- Village
- Location within Turkey
- Coordinates: 39.203°N 40.592°E
- Country: Turkey
- Province: Bingöl
- District: Adaklı
- Population (2021): 409
- Time zone: UTC+3 (TRT)

Doğankaya (Kurdish: Aznafer) is a village in the Adaklı District, Bingöl Province, Turkey. The village is populated by Kurds of the Şadiyan tribe and had a population of 409 in 2021.

The hamlet of Çukurağıl is attached to the village.
