= Beşatlı, Yüksekova =

Village in Hakkari Province, Turkey

Beşatlı
- Village
- Location within Turkey
- Coordinates: 37.609°N 44.190°E
- Country: Turkey
- Province: Hakkâri
- District: Yüksekova
- Population (2023): 703
- Time zone: UTC+3 (TRT)

Beşatlı (Kurdish: Xilxês, Syriac: Ḥūlḥūs) is a village in Yüksekova District in Hakkâri Province in Turkey. The village is populated by Kurds of the Pinyanişî tribe and had a population of 703 in 2023.

The hamlet of Çakmak (Gulank) is attached to the village.

== History ==
The village was populated by 16 Assyrian families in 1850 and 10 families in 1877.

== Population ==
Population history from 1997 to 2023:

Population
Year	Pop.	±%
1997	919	—
2007	689	−25.0%
2012	784	+13.8%
2017	797	+1.7%
2022	720	−9.7%
2023	703	−2.4%
