= Yeniışık, Yüksekova =

Village in Hakkari Province, Turkey

Yeniışık
- Village
- Location within Turkey
- Coordinates: 37.635°N 44.036°E
- Country: Turkey
- Province: Hakkâri
- District: Yüksekova
- Population (2023): 398
- Time zone: UTC+3 (TRT)

Yeniışık (Kurdish: Kineriwî) is a village in the Yüksekova District of Hakkâri Province in Turkey. The village had a population of 398 in 2023.

The four hamlets of Alacık (Şatax), Basamak (Nêrdan), Mezraa and Olukbaşı (Hirçkusa jorî) are attached to Yeniışık.

== Population ==
Population history from 2007 to 2023:

Population
Year	Pop.	±%
2007	479	—
2010	594	+24.0%
2015	529	−10.9%
2020	396	−25.1%
2023	398	+0.5%
