= Bağdaş, Yüksekova =

Village in Hakkari Province, Turkey

Bağdaş
- Village
- Location within Turkey
- Coordinates: 37.703°N 44.206°E
- Country: Turkey
- Province: Hakkâri
- District: Yüksekova
- Population (2023): 979
- Time zone: UTC+3 (TRT)

Bağdaş (Kurdish: Peranîs) is a village in Yüksekova District in Hakkâri Province in Turkey. The village is populated by Kurds of the Pinyanişî tribe and had a population of 979 in 2023.

The four hamlets of Ericik (Silort), Gedikli (Gove), Kayakonak (Hisark) and Tatlıcak (Zêkan) are attached to Bağdaş.

== Population ==
Population history from 1997 to 2023:

Population
Year	Pop.	±%
1997	1,127	—
2007	1,595	+41.5%
2012	1,230	−22.9%
2017	1,154	−6.2%
2022	1,039	−10.0%
2023	979	−5.8%
