= İnanlı, Yüksekova =

Neighborhood in Yüksekova, Turkey

İnanlı
- Neighbourhood
- Location in Turkey
- Coordinates: 37.572°N 44.235°E
- Country: Turkey
- Province: Hakkâri
- District: Yüksekova
- Municipality: Yüksekova
- Population (2023): 2,863
- Time zone: UTC+3 (TRT)

İnanlı (Kurdish: Xalanê) is a neighborhood in Yüksekova in Yüksekova District of Hakkâri Province in Turkey. It had a population of 2,863 in 2023.

İnanlı was a village until 2023

The locals are sheep herders.

== Population ==
Population history from 1997 to 2023:

Population
Year	Pop.	±%
1997	589	—
2007	886	+50.4%
2012	1,256	+41.8%
2017	1,858	+47.9%
2022	2,800	+50.7%
2023	2,863	+2.2%
