= Gürkavak, Yüksekova =

Village in Hakkari Province, Turkey

Gürkavak
- Village
- Location within Turkey
- Coordinates: 37.423°N 44.185°E
- Country: Turkey
- Province: Hakkâri
- District: Yüksekova
- Population (2023): 781
- Time zone: UTC+3 (TRT)

Gürkavak (Kurdish: Şaglord) is a village in the Yüksekova District of Hakkâri Province in Turkey. The village is populated by Kurds of the Oramar and Doski tribe and had a population of 781 in 2023.

The hamlet of İkizler (Memîşte) is attached to it.

== Population ==
Population history from 1997 to 2023:

Population
Year	Pop.	±%
1997	663	—
2007	306	−53.8%
2012	475	+55.2%
2017	286	−39.8%
2022	297	+3.8%
2023	781	+163.0%
