= Büyükçiftlik, Yüksekova =

Municipality in Hakkâri Province, Turkey

Büyükçiftlik
- Municipality
- Location in Turkey
- Coordinates: 37.584°N 44.074°E
- Country: Turkey
- Province: Hakkâri
- District: Yüksekova
- Population (2023): 3,862
- Time zone: UTC+3 (TRT)

Büyükçiftlik (Kurdish: Xirwate) is a municipality (belde) in Yüksekova District in Hakkâri Province in Turkey. The belde is populated by Kurds of the Pinyanişî tribe and had a population of 3,862 in 2023.

The municipality is divided into the neighborhoods of Kerem Zeydan, Merkez and Yeşilova.

== History ==
In 1947, Büyükçiftlik was described as a rapidly growing village suitable for tourism with a nearby forest and a mountain over 2000 meters high.

== Population ==
Population history from 1997 to 2023:

Population
| Year | Pop. | ±% |
|---|---|---|
| 1997 | 2,952 | — |
| 2007 | 3,726 | +26.2% |
| 2012 | 3,602 | −3.3% |
| 2017 | 3,435 | −4.6% |
| 2022 | 3,296 | −4.0% |
| 2023 | 3,862 | +17.2% |

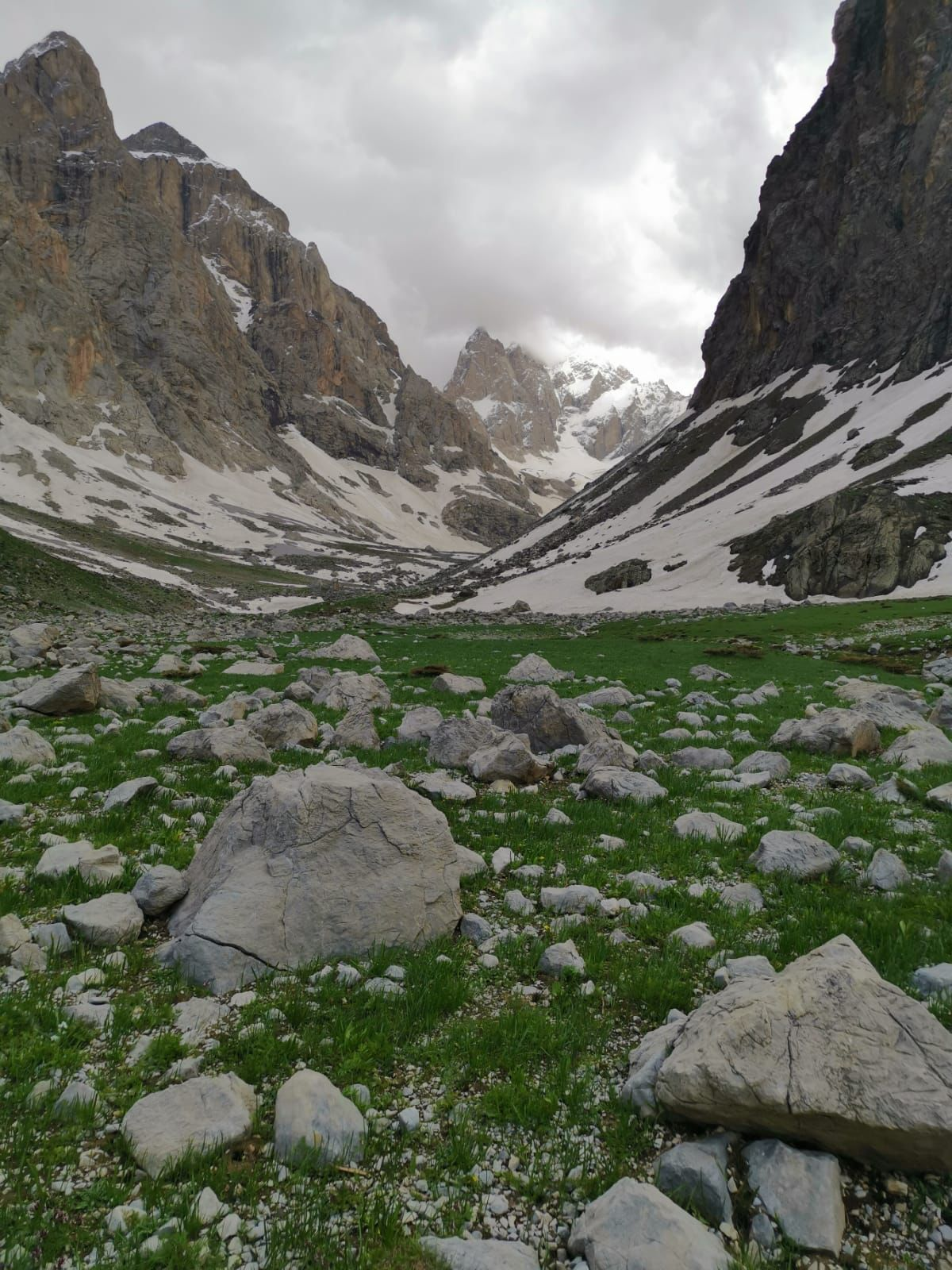
The Cilo mountain southeast of Büyükçiftlik
