= Çatma, Adaklı =

Village in Bingöl Province, Turkey

Çatma
- Village
- Location within Turkey
- Coordinates: 39.235°N 40.598°E
- Country: Turkey
- Province: Bingöl
- District: Adaklı
- Population (2021): 148
- Time zone: UTC+3 (TRT)

Çatma (Kurdish: Zabuk) is a village in the Adaklı District, Bingöl Province, Turkey. The village is populated by Kurds of the Şadiyan tribe and had a population of 148 in 2021.
