= Inallu (tribe) =

Oghuz tribe of Azerbaijan and Iran

Inallu, also spelled Inanlu or Aynallu (Persian: اینللو), is an Oghuz tribe inhabiting Azerbaijan, central Iran, and Fars.

== Etymology ==
According to Vladimir Minorsky, the name of the tribe was rooted in the Turkic term īnāl or yenāl. Minorsky proposed that the tribe possibly sprang from the family and retinue of Ibrahim Inal, who was the half-brother of Tughril I. Many centuries later, when the tribe became part of Shahsevan, its name evolved into Īmānlū, meaning 'with iman (faith)', and Īnānlū, which derives from the Turkic verb inan (to believe). Minorsky further suggested that the form Aynallū attested by the early 1800s was related to the term āʾīnalū (lit. 'having mirrors'), which referred to the Werndl–Holub rifle.

== Bibliography ==
- Oberling, Pierre (1987). "Aynallū". In Yarshater, Ehsan (ed.). Encyclopædia Iranica. Vol. III/2: Awāʾel al-maqālāt–Azerbaijan IV. London and New York: Routledge & Kegan Paul. pp. 143–144. ISBN 978-0-71009-114-7.
