= Demirkonak, Yüksekova =

Village in Hakkari Province, Turkey

Demirkonak
- Village
- Location within Turkey
- Coordinates: 37.523°N 44.372°E
- Country: Turkey
- Province: Hakkâri
- District: Yüksekova
- Population (2023): 443
- Time zone: UTC+3 (TRT)

Demirkonak (Kurdish: Kaport) is a village in the Yüksekova District of Hakkâri Province in Turkey. The village is populated by Kurds of the Dirî tribe and had a population of 443 in 2023.

The hamlet of Altınoluk, Beşbulak, Köycük and Yumrutaş (Kuçe) is attached to it.

== Population ==
Population history from 1997 to 2023:

Population
Year	Pop.	±%
1997	1,288	—
2007	876	−32.0%
2012	1,023	+16.8%
2017	447	−56.3%
2022	441	−1.3%
2023	443	+0.5%
