= Great Zab =

River in Iraq and Turkey

Great Zab Arabic: الزَّاب الْكَبِيْر (al-Zâb al-Kabîr), زێی گەورە (Zêyê Mezin), Turkish: Zap Suyu, Syriac: ܙܒܐ ܥܠܝܐ zāba ʻalya, Armenian: Մեծ Զավ Mets Zav, Byzantine Greek: μέγας Ζβαω, Classical Greek: Λύκος, Akkadian: Zabu ēlū
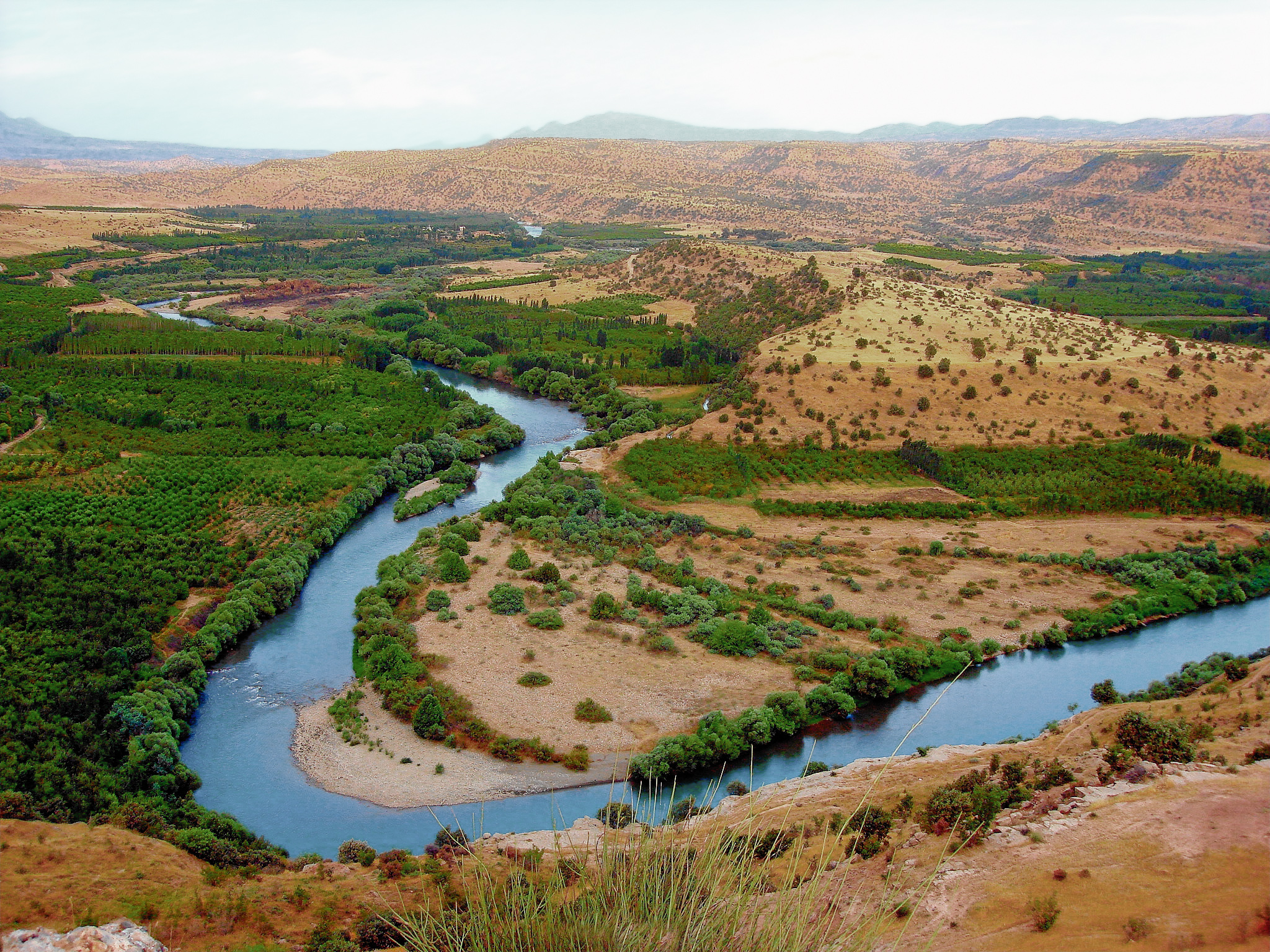
- Landscape of a section of the Great Zab in Erbil, Kurdistan Region of Iraq.

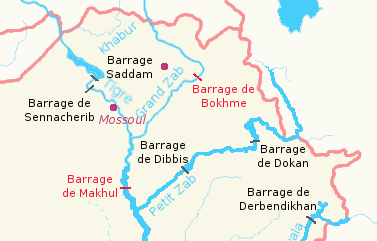
- Map (in French) showing the course of the Great Zab (Grand Zab) in Iraq and the location of the Bekhme Dam (Barrage de Bekhme)

Location
- Country: Turkey, Iraq (Kurdistan Region)
- Cities: Amadiya, Barzan

Physical characteristics
- Source
  - location: Taurus Mountains, Turkey
  - elevation: 3,000 m (9,800 ft)approx.
- Mouth
  - location: Tigris, Iraq
  - coordinates: 35°59′28″N 43°20′37″E
- Length: 400 km (250 mi)approx.
- Basin size: 40,300 km^{2} (15,600 sq mi)approx.
- Discharge
  - average: 419 m^{3}/s (14,800 cu ft/s)
  - maximum: 1,320 m^{3}/s (47,000 cu ft/s)

Basin features
- Tributaries
  - left: Rubar-i-Shin, Rukuchuk, Rubar-i-Ruwandiz, Rubat Mawaran, Bastura Chai
  - right: Khazir

The Great Zab or Upper Zab (Arabic: الزَّاب الْكَبِيْر, romanized: ez-Zâb el-Kebîr; Kurdish: زێی گەورە, romanized: Zêyê Mezin; Turkish: Zap; Syriac: ܙܒܐ ܥܠܝܐ, romanized: zāba ʻalya) is an approximately 400-kilometre (250 mi) long river flowing through Turkey and Iraq. It rises in Turkey near Lake Van and joins the Tigris in Iraq south of Mosul. During its course, the river collects water from many tributaries and the drainage basin of the Great Zab covers approximately 40,300 square kilometres (15,600 sq mi). The river and its tributaries are primarily fed by rainfall and snowmelt – as a result of which discharge fluctuates highly throughout the year. At least six dams have been planned on the Great Zab and its tributaries, but construction of only one, the Bekhme Dam, has commenced but was halted after the Gulf War.

The Zagros Mountains have been occupied since at least the Lower Palaeolithic, and Neanderthal occupation of the Great Zab basin has been testified at the archaeological site of Shanidar Cave. Historical records for the region are available from the end of the third millennium BCE onward. In the Neo-Assyrian period, the Great Zab provided water for irrigation for the lands around the capital city of Nimrud. The Battle of the Zab – which ended the Umayyad Caliphate – took place near a tributary of the Great Zab, and the valleys of the river provided shelter for refugees from the Mongol conquest of Iraq. During the 19th and 20th centuries, the Great Zab basin saw frequent uprisings of local Kurdish tribes striving for autonomy.

== Etymology ==
In Kurdish, the river is known as the "Great Zê" (زێی گەورە) or "Badinan Zê" (زێی بادینان). The term Zê refers to mountain springs, rivers, and rainwater. As a feminine noun, it symbolizes a "mother source", representing life and procreation. In Kurdish culture, all watercourses are considered Zê because they are the essential source of life.

== Course ==
The Great Zab rises in Turkey in the mountainous region east of Lake Van at an elevation of approximately 3,000 metres (9,800 ft) amsl and joins the Tigris on its left bank in Iraq. In Turkey, the Great Zab traverses the provinces of Van and Hakkâri, whereas in Iraq it flows through Duhok Governorate and Erbil Governorate, both part of the Kurdistan Region. Together with the Tigris, the Great Zab forms the boundary between Erbil Governorate and Ninawa Governorate. In its upper reaches, the Great Zab flows through steep, rocky gorges. The stretch between Amadiya and the Bekhme Gorge, where the Bekhme Dam remains unfinished, has been called the Sapna valley and will have a large portion of it inundated with water if the project is completed. Numerous mountain streams and wadis join the Great Zab on its right and left banks. The Great Zab receives most of its waters from the left-bank tributaries; the Rubar-i-Shin, Rukuchuk, Rubar-i-Ruwandiz, Rubat Mawaran and Bastura Chai.

The length of the Great Zab has been variously estimated at 392 kilometres (244 mi) and 473 kilometres (294 mi). Approximately 300 kilometres (190 mi) of the river's course is located within Iraq. The average discharge of the Great Zab is 419 cubic metres (14,800 cu ft) per second, but peak discharges of up to 1,320 cubic metres (47,000 cu ft) per second have been recorded. The average annual discharge is 13.2 cubic kilometres (3.2 cu mi). Because of its torrential nature, Medieval Arab geographers have described the Great Zab – together with the Little Zab – as "demoniacally possessed".

== Watershed ==
Estimates of the drainage basin of the Great Zab vary widely – from a low 25,810 square kilometres (9,970 sq mi) to a high figure of 40,300 square kilometres (15,600 sq mi). Approximately 62 percent of the basin is located in Iraq; the remainder is in Turkey. To the south, the Great Zab basin borders on that of the Little Zab while on the east it adjoins the Tigris basin. The Zagros consists of parallel limestone folds rising to elevations of over 3,000 metres (9,800 ft) amsl. The valleys – including that of the Great Zab – and the south-western foothill zone are filled with gravel, conglomerate, and sandstone; the result of water erosion. The Amadiya valley within the Great Zab drainage basin is the third-largest valley in the Iraqi Zagros, after the Shahrazor and the Ranya Plain.

The Great Zab rises in the highlands of the Zagros Mountains, where a climate with cold winter and annual precipitation in excess of 1,000 millimetres (39 in) prevails. From there, the river flows into the foothill zone of the Zagros, where rainfall drops to less than 300 millimetres (12 in) per year at the confluence with the Tigris. Average summer temperature in the foothill zone are generally higher in the foothill zone than in the mountains. The high Zagros is characterized by three different biomes: the area above the treeline at 1,800 metres (5,900 ft) where shrubs and herbs dominate, the area between 1,800 and 610 metres (5,910 and 2,000 ft) that was in the past dominated by open oak forest (Quercus aegilops), and the wetter and sometimes marshy river valleys. Other trees besides oak that can be found in the forested zone including juniper at higher elevations; ash, hawthorn, maple and walnut at intermediate elevations; and pistachio and olive trees in lower, drier areas. In the foothill zone, many areas are now cultivated, but there remain small patches of natural vegetation dominated by herbs of the genus Phlomis.

== River modifications ==
To date, one large dam has been partially constructed on the Great Zab: Iraq's Bekhme Dam and Turkey's 24 MW weir-controlled run-of-the-river Bağışlı Hydroelectric Power Plant. Five others have been planned in the Great Zab basin by both Turkey and Iraq. Turkey's State Hydraulic Works plans to construct the Çukurca and Doğanlı Dams near Çukurca and the Hakkâri Dam near the city of Hakkâri. The Hakkâri Dam with a 245 MW power station is in final design and the Çukurca and Doğanlı Dams will support 245 MW and 462 MW power stations, respectively.

Iraq has commenced construction of the Bekhme and Deralok Dams and planned two others – the Khazir-Gomel and Mandawa Dams. Plans to build a dam in the Great Zab at the Bekhme Gorge for flood control and irrigation were first proposed in 1937. A feasibility study determined that the site was not suited for dam construction and the plan was abandoned. In 1976, another study proposed three different locations on the Great Zab, including the site suggested in the earlier study. This site was eventually chosen in 1989, when work on the dam commenced. Construction of the Bekhme Dam was interrupted by the outbreak of the Gulf War in 1990 and the dam remains unfinished. After the war, the site of the dam was looted. The plans of the Bekhme Dam called for a 230-metre (750 ft) high rockfill dam and an underground hydroelectric power station housing six turbines with a total capacity of 1,560 MW. The reservoir that would have been created by the Bekhme Dam would have a storage capacity of 17 cubic kilometres (4.1 cu mi) and would have flooded numerous villages, the archaeological site of Zawi Chemi Shanidar and the access road to Shanidar Cave (although not the cave itself).

== History ==
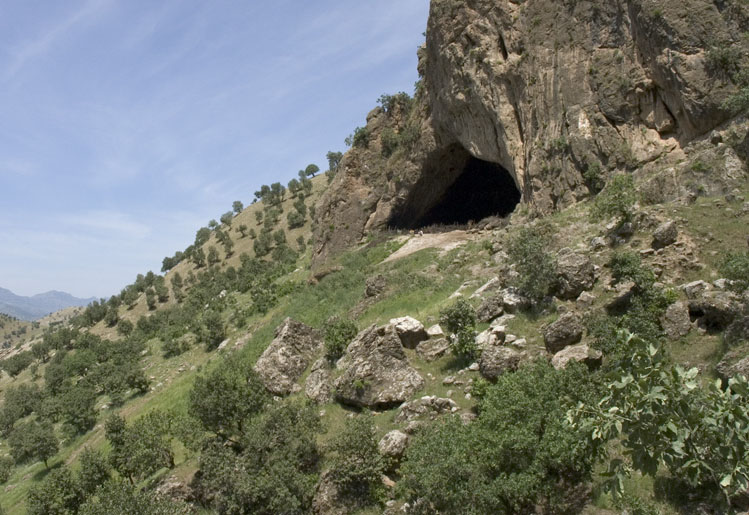
The entrance to Shanidar Cave

Evidence for human occupation of the Zagros reaches back into the Lower Palaeolithic, as evidenced by the discovery of many cave-sites dating to that period in the Iranian part of the mountain range. Middle Palaeolithic stone tool assemblages are known from Barda Balka, a cave-site south of the Little Zab; and from the Iranian Zagros. A Mousterian stone tool assemblage – produced by either Neanderthals or anatomically modern humans – was recently excavated in Erbil. Neanderthals also occupied the site of Shanidar. This cave-site, located in the Sapna Valley, has yielded a settlement sequence stretching from the Middle Palaeolithic up to the Epipalaeolithic period. The site is particularly well known for its Neanderthal burials. The Epipalaeolithic occupation of Shanidar, contemporary with the use of the Kebaran stone tool assemblage, is the oldest evidence for anatomically modern human occupation of the Great Zab basin. The following Protoneolithic, or Natufian, occupation is contemporary with the oldest occupation of the nearby open-air site Zawi Chemi Shanidar. M'lefaat on the Khazir River (a tributary to the Great Zab) was a small village of hunter-gatherers dating to the 10th millennium BCE that was contemporary with the Pre-Pottery Neolithic A in the Levant. An archaeological survey of the Citadel of Erbil, in the plain south of the lower course of the Great Zab, has shown that this site was continuously occupied at least from the 6th millennium BCE upward.

The earliest historical reference to the region dates to the Ur III dynasty, when king Shulgi mentioned the city of Urbilum – the ancient name of modern-day Erbil. The great Assyrian capitals of Assur, Nineveh, Nimrud and Dur-Sharrukin were all located in the foothill zone where the Great Zab flows into the Tigris, and the Great Zab basin became increasingly integrated into the Middle Assyrian and Neo-Assyrian empires. Nimrud, the capital of the empire until 706 BCE, was located only 10 kilometres (6.2 mi) away from the confluence of the Great Zab with the Tigris. The Assyrian king Ashurnasirpal II constructed a canal called Patti-Hegalli that tapped water from the Great Zab to irrigate the land around Nimrud, and this canal was restored by his successors Tiglath-Pileser III and Esarhaddon. This canal ran along the right bank of the Great Zab and cut through a rock bluff by means of a tunnel and is still visible today. After the fall of the Neo-Assyrian empire, the Medes gained control of the area, followed by the Achaemenids in 550 BCE. The Battle of Gaugamela in 331 BCE – one of the decisive battles leading to the fall of the Achaemenid empire at the hands of Alexander the Great – supposedly took place north of the Great Zab in the vicinity of Mosul. After Alexander's death in 323 BCE, control of the area shifted to the Seleucids.

In 750 CE, the last Umayyad caliph Marwan II was defeated by the Abbasid As-Saffah in the Battle of the Zab on the banks of the Khazir River, a tributary to the Great Zab. When the Mongols swept over Iraq in the 13th century and sacked Erbil, many survivors sought a refuge in the inaccessible valleys of the Great Zab. The Sapna Valley was home to both Christian and Muslim communities, as evidenced by Christian artefacts found at Zawi Chemi Shanidar. During the 19th century, the area was controlled by local Kurdish leaders. During World War I, heavy fighting took place in the area, and Rowanduz was pillaged by Russian soldiers in 1916. Following World War I, episodes of heavy fighting took place between the Barzani tribe – striving for the establishment of an independent Kurdish polity – and several other Kurdish tribes, and between the Barzanis and the Iraqi Government. The last of these uprisings started in 1974 and led to heavy bombardments of towns and villages in the Great Zab basin.

== See also ==
- Tigris–Euphrates river system
