= Gökçeli, Adaklı =

Village in Bingöl Province, Turkey

Gökçeli
- Village
- Location within Turkey
- Coordinates: 39.211°N 40.407°E
- Country: Turkey
- Province: Bingöl
- District: Adaklı
- Population (2021): 236
- Time zone: UTC+3 (TRT)

Gökçeli (Kurdish: Horhor) is a village in the Adaklı District, Bingöl Province, Turkey. The village is populated by Kurds of the Şadiyan tribe and had a population of 236 in 2021.

The hamlets of Aşağı Çanakçı, Kargıcak, Kilimli, Şahhüseyin and Yukarı Çanakçı are attached to the village.
