= Adaklı, Yüksekova =

Village in Hakkari Province, Turkey

Adaklı
- Village
- Location within Turkey
- Coordinates: 37.527°N 44.166°E
- Country: Turkey
- Province: Hakkâri
- District: Yüksekova
- Population (2023): 1,075
- Time zone: UTC+3 (TRT)

Adaklı (Kurdish: Alekanan) is a village in the Yüksekova District of Hakkâri Province in Turkey. The village is populated by Kurds of the Doski, Oramar and Pinyanişî tribes and had a population of 1,075 in 2023. The village was previously Assyrian.

== History ==
The village of Adaklı was previously Assyrian until Sayfo and was bought from the central government by Kurds from different tribal backgrounds creating a mixed tribally-composed village.

== Population ==
Population history from 1997 to 2023:

Population
| Year | Pop. | ±% |
|---|---|---|
| 1997 | 950 | — |
| 2007 | 1,135 | +19.5% |
| 2012 | 1,299 | +14.4% |
| 2017 | 1,194 | −8.1% |
| 2022 | 1,105 | −7.5% |
| 2023 | 1,075 | −2.7% |
