= Doğanlı, Yüksekova =

Village in Hakkari Province, Turkey

Doğanlı
- Village
- Location within Turkey
- Coordinates: 37.480°N 44.301°E
- Country: Turkey
- Province: Hakkâri
- District: Yüksekova
- Population (2023): 1,087
- Time zone: UTC+3 (TRT)

Doğanlı (Kurdish: Ertuş) is a village in the Yüksekova District in Hakkâri Province in Turkey. The village is populated by Kurds of the Alan tribe and had a population of 1,087 in 2023.

== History ==
The residents of the village were originally from the village of Uzundere in nearby Çukurca District but were relocated to the new settlement of Doğanlı in the mid-1990s during the Kurdish–Turkish conflict. The families were village guards.

== Population ==
Population history from 2007 to 2023:

Population
Year	Pop.	±%
2007	961	—
2012	1,070	+11.3%
2017	1,133	+5.9%
2022	1,089	−3.9%
2023	1,087	−0.2%
