= Adaklı =

- Municipality
- Location within Turkey
- Coordinates: 39°13′51″N 40°28′41″E
- Country: Turkey
- Province: Bingöl
- District: Adaklı

Government
  - Mayor: Zeki Işık (AKP)
- Population (2021): 3,063
- Time zone: UTC+3 (TRT)
- Website: www.adakli.bel.tr

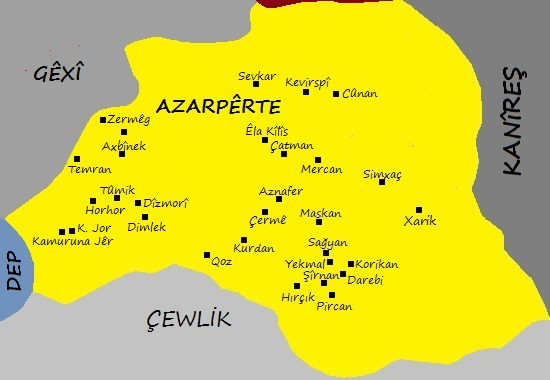
A map of Azarpêrt

Adaklı (Kurdish: Azaxpêrt, Armenian: Աստղաբերդ, romanized: Astghaberd) is a town and seat of the Adaklı District of Bingöl Province in Turkey. The town is populated by Kurds of the Şadiyan tribe and had a population of 3,063 in 2021.

The town is divided into the neighborhoods of Afet Konutları, Arıcı, Demiroluk, Döşlüce, Güngörsün, Merkez and Yeşiltepe.
