= Yüksekova =

Municipality in Hakkâri Province, Turkey

- Municipality
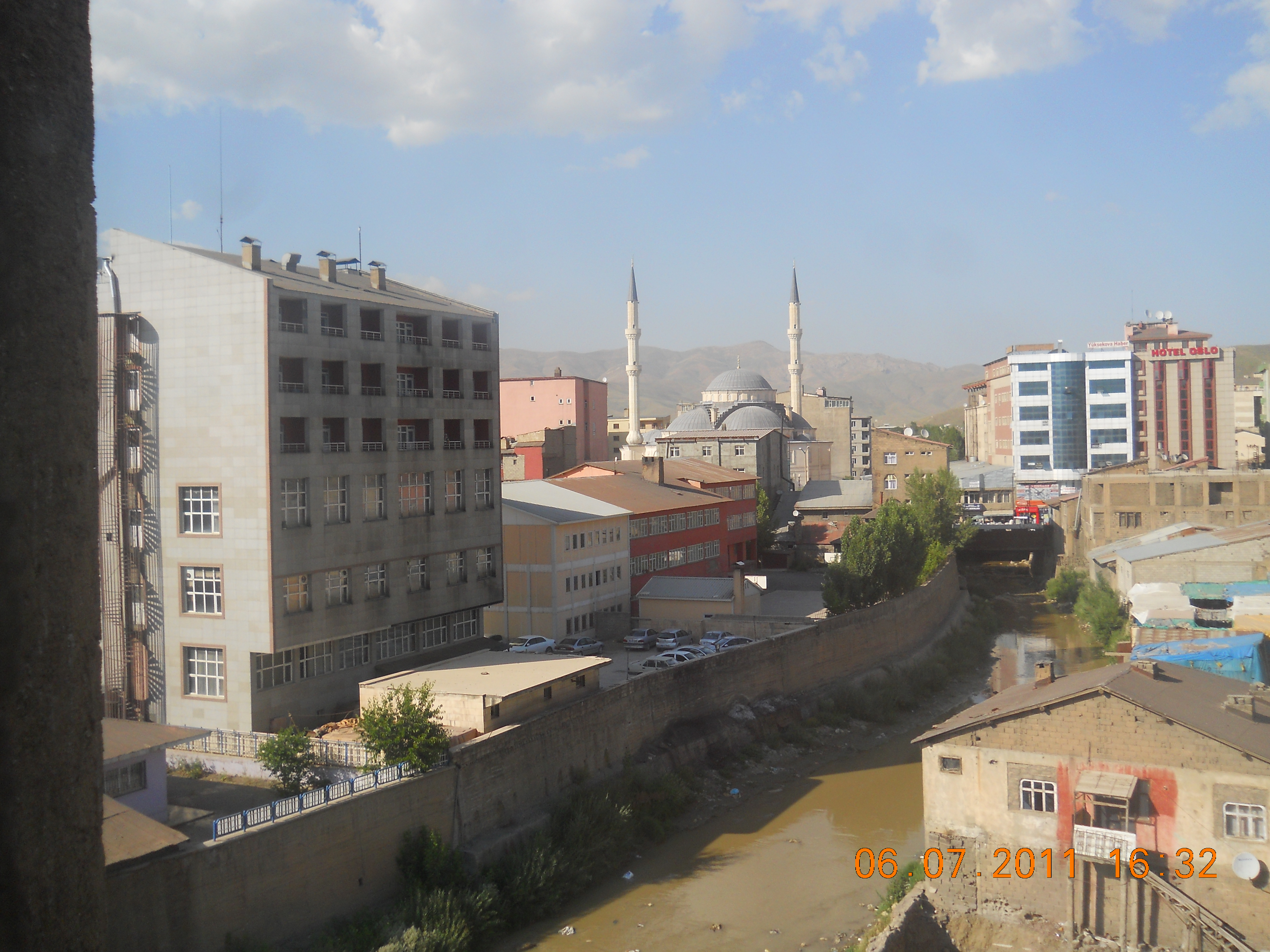
- Yüksekova in 2011, near the Ihsaniye Mosque and city center

- Logo

- Location within Turkey
- Coordinates: 37.569°N 44.283°E
- Country: Turkey
- Province: Hakkâri
- District: Yüksekova
- Population (2023): 84,800
- Time zone: UTC+3 (TRT)

Yüksekova (Kurdish: Gever; Syriac: ܓܵܘܵܪ, romanized: Gāwār) is a municipality (belde) in the Yüksekova District of Hakkâri Province in Turkey and is the largest city in the province. The city is populated by Kurds of diverse tribal backgrounds, as well as non-tribal Kurds and is considered part of Turkish Kurdistan. Yüksekova had a population of 84,800 in 2023.

== Name ==
Yüksekova was historically known as Dize meaning fortress in Kurdish.

This region is attested as early as the 4th century in the Syriac text Acts of Mar Mari as Gāwār, a region that Christianity was introduced in, and whose inhabitants were converted to Christianity from paganism by Saint Ţomīs.

The word Yüksekova means 'plateau' and is a Turkification of the original name Gever which in Kurdish means 'raised meadow'. In Armenian, however, the word refers to an administrative unit such as district of province, while the word refers to Zoroastrians in Persian. For Muslims, Gavur means infidel and refers to all non-Muslims.

== History ==
=== Early history ===
It is believed that a permanent settlement was established in Yüksekova (Gever) in 7000 BC. The city was ruled by the various early age civilizations and empires of the Hurrians, Medes, Persians and Urartians. A remaining ruin of the Urartian civilization is the Ordu Road, which has inscriptions written in Urartian language.

The city was conquered by the Ottoman Empire during the reign of Suleiman the Magnificent. The city also had a sizeable Assyrian Christian population, whose numbers declined due to the Ottoman Empire's genocide of Assyrian Christians. During World War I, the city was briefly occupied by the Russian Empire.

=== Kurdish-Turkish conflict ===
==== 2014–2016 ====
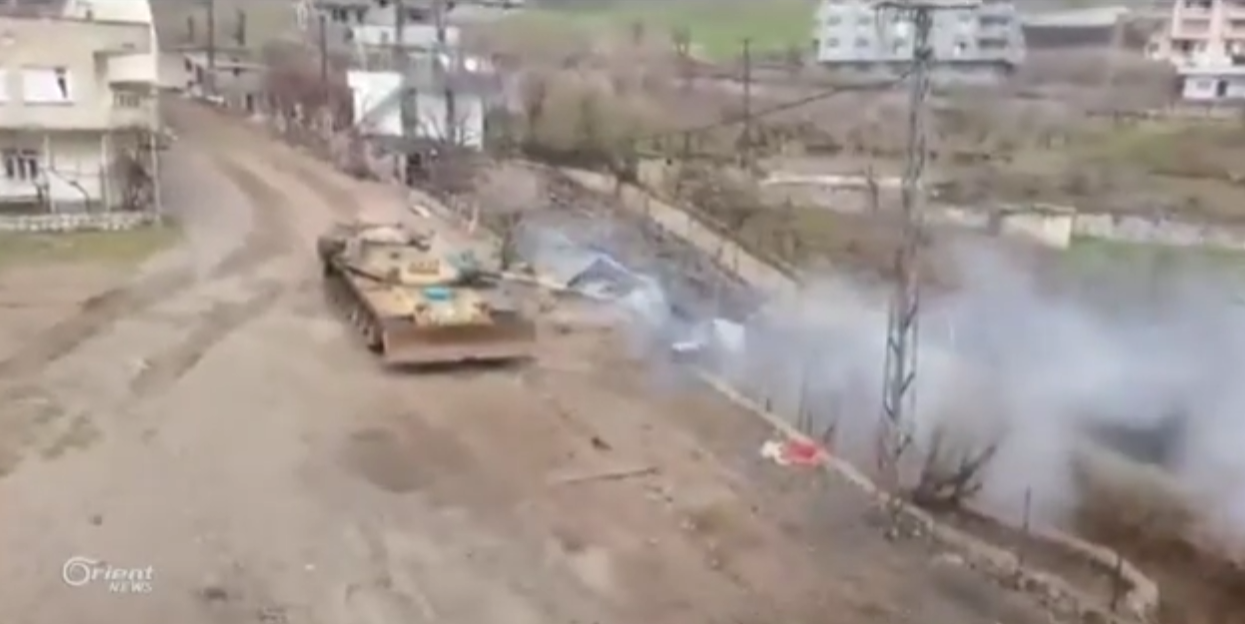
Turkish tank shooting rounds near Yüksekova (Gever), in 2016.

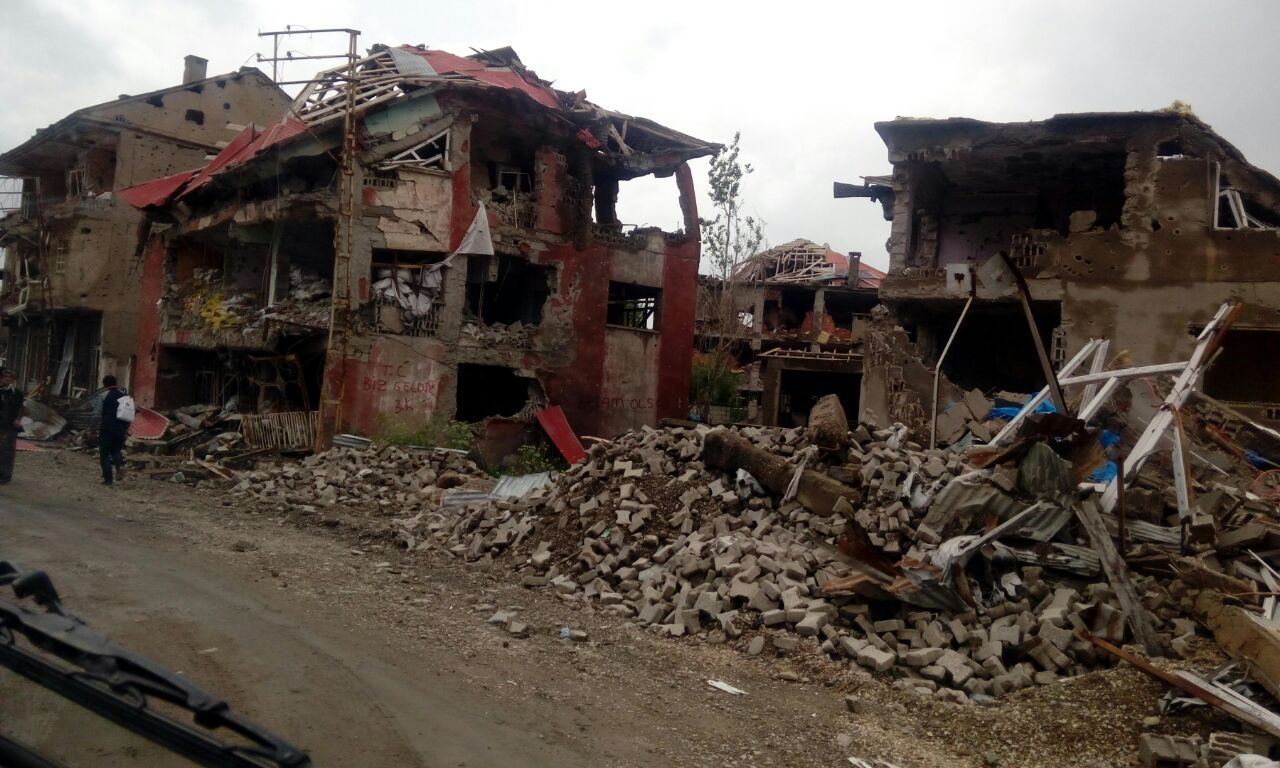
Yüksekova (Gever) after the 2015–2016 conflict.

It is estimated that around 100 young people went from Yüksekova (Gever) to Syrian Kurdistan, to help Kurdish forces during the Siege of Kobanî in 2014, after the war against ISIS revived pan-Kurdish sentiment.

In the late summer and fall of 2015, following the 2014 Kobanî protests, which were part of the broader third phase of the Kurdish–Turkish conflict, local Kurdish youth and activists, with some of them being affiliated with the YDG-H, and later YPS, organized popular protests, riots, and declared "self-management" in the city of Yüksekova (Gever). This led to Turkish government imposed curfews and heavy fighting between the Kurdish side and Turkish security personnel, which included the deployment of the Turkish army in the city. In March 2016, Deutsche Welle described the situation as a military siege imposed by the Turkish armed forces. Apartment buildings were flattened, houses were left without roofs, large holes pierced house walls, and bomb craters covered the streets following the Turkish Army's "operation" in the city. According to a report of the Union of Chambers of Turkish Engineers and Architects 3,637 houses were made uninhabitable and 35% of the population was left homeless. In 2022, the Human Rights Association (İHD) reported that, despite six years having passed, the effects of the destruction caused during the period of curfews remained visible.

==== 2016-present ====
Remziye Yaşar (Peoples' Democratic Party) was elected mayor in 2019. She was arrested in October 2019 over terrorism-related charges and replaced by a trustee appointed by the central government.

== Neighborhoods ==
The city is divided into the neighborhoods of Akalın, Aksu, Altınoluk, Beşbulak, Bölük, Cumhuriyet, Dedeler, Dize, Esen Yurt, Esentepe, Eskikışla, Güçlü, Güllüce, Güngor, Güvenli, İnanlı, İpek, Kerem Zeydan, Merkez, Mezarlık, Sarıyıldız, Vezirli, Yeni, Yeşildere, Yeşilova and Yılmaz.

== Demographics ==
Population history from 1997 to 2023:

Population
Year	Pop.	±%
1997	54,739	—
2007	59,410	+8.5%
2012	68,230	+14.8%
2017	69,346	+1.6%
2022	72,745	+4.9%
2023	84,800	+16.6%

== Climate ==
Yüksekova has a dry-summer humid continental climate (Köppen: Dsb), with warm, dry summers, and very cold, snowy winters.

Climate data for Yüksekova (1991–2020)
Month	Jan	Feb	Mar	Apr	May	Jun	Jul	Aug	Sep	Oct	Nov	Dec	Year
Mean daily maximum °C (°F)	−2.3 (27.9)	−0.6 (30.9)	4.7 (40.5)	11.5 (52.7)	18.0 (64.4)	24.5 (76.1)	29.1 (84.4)	29.7 (85.5)	25.4 (77.7)	18.2 (64.8)	9.4 (48.9)	0.9 (33.6)	14.1 (57.4)
Daily mean °C (°F)	−8.4 (16.9)	−6.6 (20.1)	−0.3 (31.5)	6.6 (43.9)	12.2 (54.0)	17.5 (63.5)	21.7 (71.1)	21.7 (71.1)	17.3 (63.1)	10.8 (51.4)	3.2 (37.8)	−4.8 (23.4)	7.7 (45.9)
Mean daily minimum °C (°F)	−13.6 (7.5)	−12.0 (10.4)	−4.9 (23.2)	1.9 (35.4)	6.3 (43.3)	9.6 (49.3)	13.4 (56.1)	12.9 (55.2)	8.8 (47.8)	4.1 (39.4)	−1.9 (28.6)	−9.3 (15.3)	1.3 (34.3)
Average precipitation mm (inches)	105.0 (4.13)	110.0 (4.33)	120.4 (4.74)	119.1 (4.69)	58.3 (2.30)	12.5 (0.49)	7.5 (0.30)	4.5 (0.18)	7.1 (0.28)	42.6 (1.68)	74.7 (2.94)	95.6 (3.76)	757.3 (29.81)
Average precipitation days (≥ 1.0 mm)	9.9	10.2	10.6	12.1	8.9	2.9	2.2	1.6	2.2	5.9	7.8	9.2	83.5
Average relative humidity (%)	71.1	70.0	66.1	58.1	52.2	43.4	38.5	36.3	40.2	53.0	61.8	69.9	55.1
Source: NOAA
