= Adaklı District =

District of Bingöl Province, Turkey

Coordinates: 39°14′N 40°33′E

- District
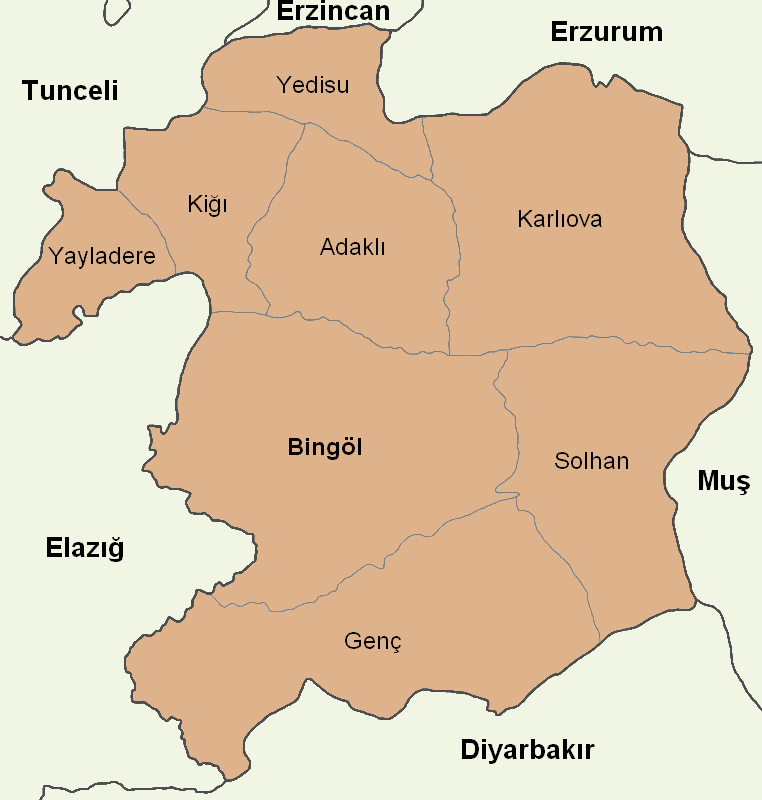
- Map showing Adaklı District in Bingöl Province
- Country: Turkey
- Province: Bingöl
- Seat: Adaklı
- Population (2021): 8,243
- Time zone: UTC+3 (TRT)
- Website: www.adakli.gov.tr

Adaklı District is a district of Bingöl Province in Turkey. The town of Adaklı is the seat and the district had a population of 8,243 in 2021.

The district was established in 1987.

== Composition ==
Beside the town of Adaklı, the district encompasses thirty-three villages and ninety-one hamlets.

1. Akbinek (Axbinek)
2. Aktaş (Axtaş)
3. Altınevler (Şirnan)
4. Aysaklı (Înaq)
5. Ayvadüzü (Alakilise)
6. Bağlarpınarı (Temran)
7. Boyalı (Holan)
8. Cevizli (Perteg)
9. Çamlıca (Hirçık)
10. Çatma (Zabuk)
11. Çevreli (Baluca)
12. Doğankaya (Aznafer)
13. Doluçay (Saxyan)
14. Dolutekne (Yekmal)
15. Elmaağaç (Maskan)
16. Elmadüzü (Feruz)
17. Erbaşlar (Karêr)
18. Erler (Kurdan)
19. Gökçeli (Horor)
20. Hasbağlar (Karmurun)
21. Kabaçalı (Perican)
22. Kamışgölü (Tumik)
23. Karaçubuk (Dimlek)
24. Kaynakdüzü (Simhaç)
25. Kırkpınar (Harik)
26. Kozlu (Koz)
27. Maltepe
28. Mercan
29. Sarıdibek (Korkan)
30. Sevkar
31. Sütlüce (Darebî)
32. Topağaçlar (Dizmoru)
33. Yeldeğirmeni (Zermek)
