= Hakkari–Yüksekova Airport =

Public airport in Yüksekova, Hakkari Province, Republic of Turkey

Hakkari Yüksekova Selahaddin Eyyubi Airport Hakkari Yüksekova Selahaddin Eyyubi Havalimanı
- IATA: YKO; ICAO: LTCW

Summary
- Airport type: Public
- Operator: General Directorate of State Airports Authority
- Serves: Hakkari, Turkey
- Location: Yüksekova, Hakkari, Turkey
- Opened: 26 May 2015; 11 years ago
- Elevation AMSL: 1,950 m / 6,400 ft
- Coordinates: 37°33′6″N 44°14′01″E
- Website: www.dhmi.gov.tr

Map
- Location of airport in Turkey YKO (Europe)

Runways
Direction	Length		Surface
Direction	m	ft	Surface
11/29	3,200	10,499	Concrete

Statistics (2025)
- Annual passenger capacity: 1,000,000
- Passengers: 172,307
- Passenger change 2024–25: ▲10%
- Aircraft movements: 3,381
- Movements change 2024–25: ▲3%

Hakkari–Yüksekova Selahaddin Eyyubi Airport (IATA: YKO, ICAO: LTCW) (Turkish: Hakkari Yüksekova Selahaddin Eyyubi Havalimanı) is a public airport in Yüksekova, a town in Hakkari Province, Turkey.

== History ==
The construction of the airport has started on 18 July 2010. It was opened to public/civil air traffic at 26 May 2015. During the inauguration ceremony attended by President Recep Tayyip Erdoğan and Prime minister Ahmet Davutoğlu, it was announced that the airport is renamed Hakkari–Yüksekova Selahaddin Eyyubi Airport after Saladin (1137/1138–1193), a Muslim leader of Kurdish origin, who fought against Crusaders and captured Jerusalem. The airport is 5 km (3.1 mi) away from Yüksekova town centre.

== Technical details ==
The airport has a 3,200 m × 45 m (10,499 ft × 148 ft) runway, a 228 m × 120 m (748 ft × 394 ft) airport apron, a 265 m × 24 m (869 ft × 79 ft) taxiway and a 6,600 m^{2} (71,000 sq ft) terminal building. A 9.3 km (5.8 mi)-long road surrounds the facility. The ai The airport was projected with a passenger traffic volume of 1 million annually. The construction cost ₺ 120 million.

== Airlines and destinations ==
The following airlines operate regular scheduled and charter flights at Hakkari–Yüksekova Airport:

Airlines	Destinations
AJet	Ankara
Turkish Airlines	Istanbul

== Traffic Statistics ==
Hakkari–Yüksekova Selahaddin Eyyubi Airport passenger traffic statistics
Year (months)	Domestic	% change	International	% change	Total	% change
2025	172,307	▲10%	-	-	172,307	▲10%
2024	156,889	▼1%	-	-	156,889	▼1%
2023	159,276	▲38%	-	-	159,276	▲38%
2022	115,623	▼10%	-	-	115,623	▼10%
2021	127,991	▲33%	-	-	127,991	▲33%
2020	96,025	▼47%	-	-	96,025	▼47%
2019	180,506	▼5%	-	-	180,506	▼5%
2018	190,666	▲24%	-	-	190,666	▲24%
2017	153.700	▲307%	-	-	153,700	▲307%
2016	37,720	▲81%	-	-	37,720	▲81%
2015	20,876	Steady	-	Steady	20,876	Steady

^1: 2015 statistics correspond to the last 8 months of 2015 since the opening of the airport.
