= Köprücük, Yüksekova =

Village in Hakkari Province, Turkey

Köprücük
- Village
- Location within Turkey
- Coordinates: 37.57°N 44.179°E
- Country: Turkey
- Province: Hakkâri
- District: Yüksekova
- Population (2023): 631
- Time zone: UTC+3 (TRT)

Köprücük (Kurdish: Kerpêl, Syriac: Karpel) is a village in the Yüksekova District of Hakkâri Province in Turkey. The village is populated by Kurds of the Pinyanişî tribe and had a population of 631 in 2023.

== History ==
The village was populated by 20 Assyrian families in 1850 and 10 families in 1877.

== Population ==
Population history from 1997 to 2023:

Population
Year	Pop.	±%
1997	538	—
2007	632	+17.5%
2012	648	+2.5%
2017	614	−5.2%
2022	580	−5.5%
2023	631	+8.8%
