= Yüksekova District =

District in Hakkâri Province, Turkey

- District
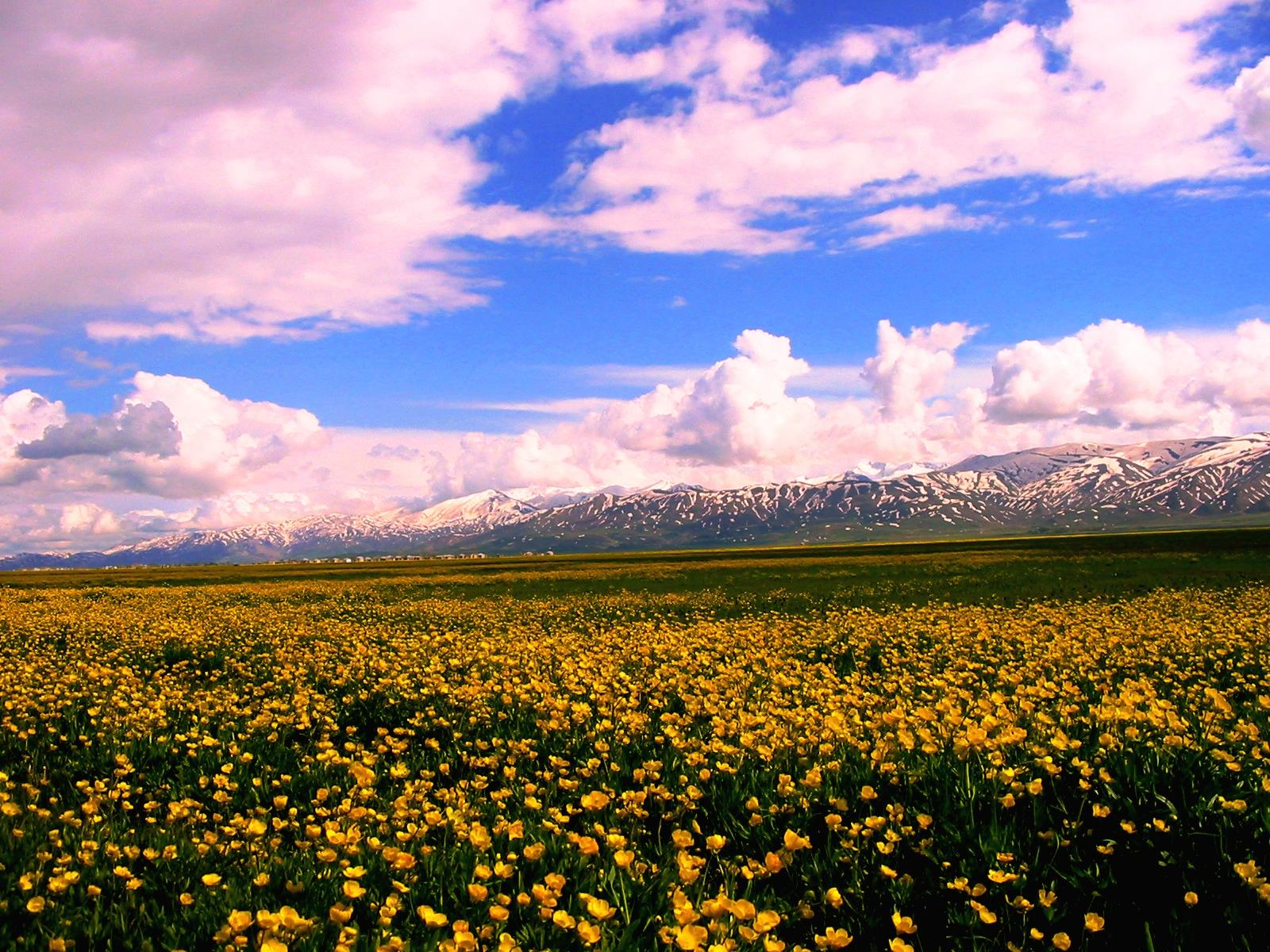
- Yüksekova during spring

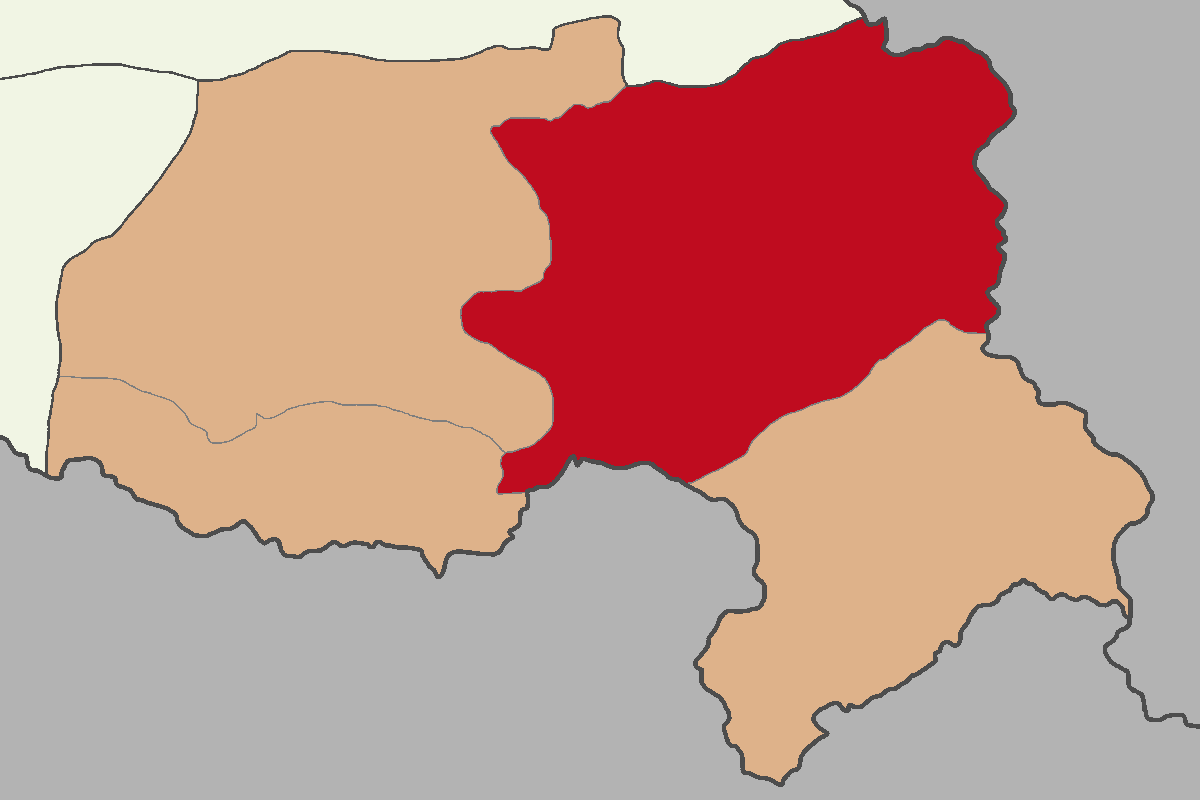
- Map showing Yüksekova District in Hakkâri Province

- Location within Turkey
- Coordinates: 37°34′N 44°17′E
- Country: Turkey
- Province: Hakkâri
- Seat: Yüksekova

Government
  - Kaymakam: Ömer Çimşit
- Area: 2,547 km^{2} (983 sq mi)
- Population (2023): 121,969
  - Density: 47.89/km^{2} (124.0/sq mi)
- Time zone: UTC+3 (TRT)
- Website: www.yuksekova.gov.tr

Yüksekova District is a district in the Hakkâri Province of Turkey. Its seat is the city Yüksekova. Its area is 2,547 km^{2} and had a population of 121,969 people in 2023. It borders Iran to the east, and Kurdistan Region of Iraq to the south.

== History ==
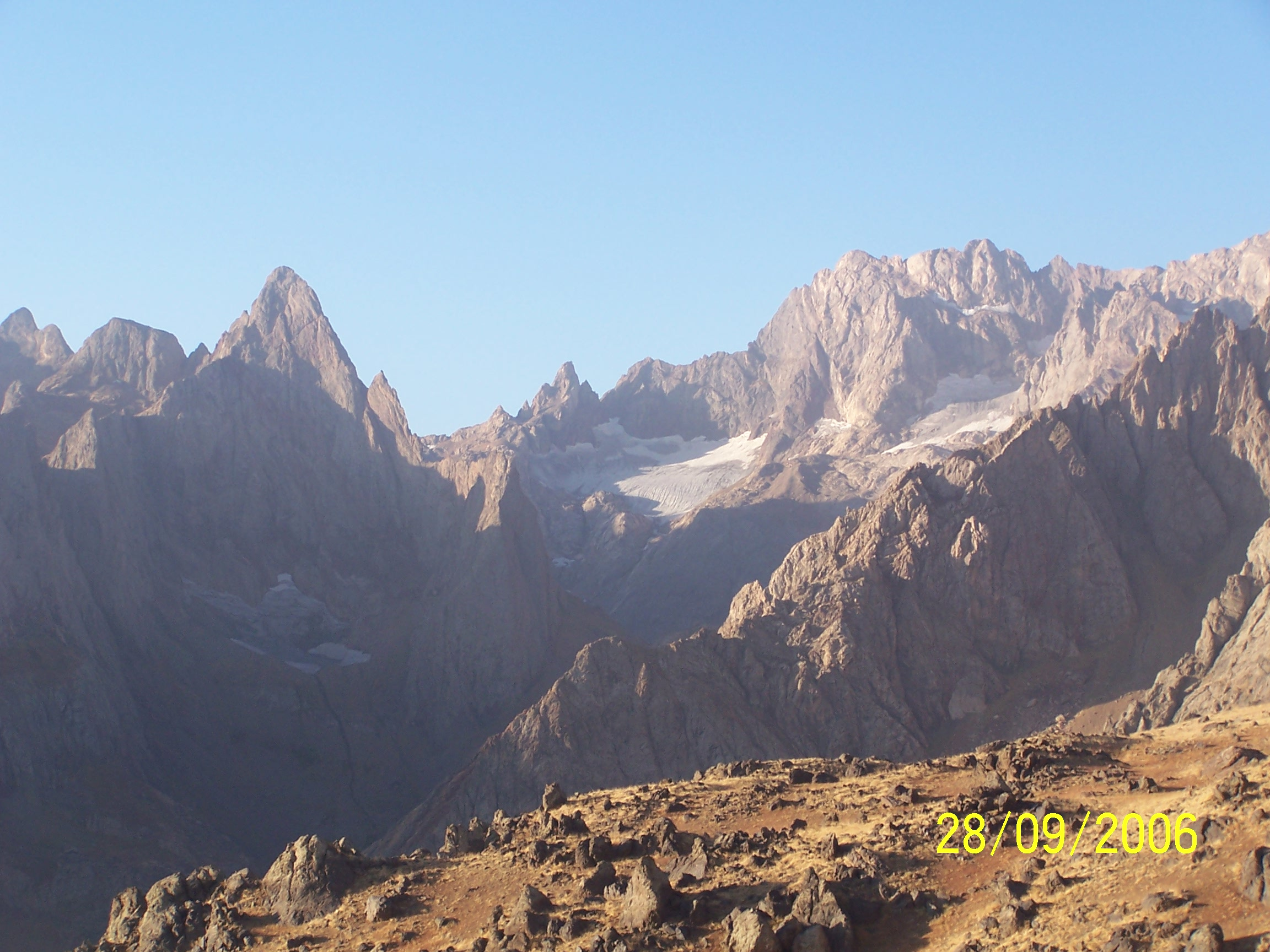
The Cilo mountain is located in the district.

The district was historically an important trade route location due to its proximity to Iran.

From the 1810s to the Sayfo in 1915, the entire population of around the Great Zab was East Syriac Assyrian whose main occupation was agriculture that consisted of wheat, barley, cotton and tea. The local Assyrian population were descendants of people who found refuge among Kurds from the Golden Horde in the early fifteenth century.

Traveller Soane visited the district in 1910, describing the area as 'one of the most inaccessible of the many sealed corners of this mountain country'. After the genocide, Assyrian villages were subsequently populated by Kurds.

In 1936, the name of the district was Turkified to Yüksekova, 'plateau'.

== Settlements ==
=== Beldes ===
The district encompasses three municipalities:

1. Yüksekova (Gever)
2. Büyükçiftlik (Xirwate)
3. Esendere (Bajêrga mezin)

=== Villages ===
The district has fifty-two villages of which three are unpopulated:

1. Adaklı (Alekanan)
2. Akçalı (Kertinis)
3. Akocak (Heleyîs)
4. Akpınar (Soryan)
5. Armutdüzü (Metolanis)
6. Aşağıuluyol (Tiloran)
7. Bağdaş (Peranîs)
8. Bataklık (Silîwana)
9. Beşatlı (Xilxês)
10. Bostancık (Gulord)
11. Bulaklı (Memkan)
12. Çatma (Sûsyan)
13. Çukurca (Pagê)
14. Dağlıca (Oremar)
15. Değerli (Memkava)
16. Demirkonak (Kaport)
17. Dibekli (Awerd)
18. Dilekli (Şuke)
19. Dilektaşı (Manîs)
20. Doğanlı (Ertuş)
21. Gökyurt (Tekurawa)
22. Güldalı (Bilinbasan)
23. Gürdere (Ciwyan)
24. Gürkavak (Şaglord)
25. Ikiyaka (Sat)
26. Kadıköy (Qadyan)
27. Kamışlı (Sînava)
28. Karabey (Serdeşt)
29. Karlı (Befircan)
30. Kazan (Tawani)
31. Keçili (Sorê)
32. Kısıklı (Dêlezî)
33. Kolbaşı (Şavite)
34. Köprücük (Kerpêl)
35. Köşkönü (Piştqesr)
36. Onbaşılar (Hirmîn)
37. Ortaç (Bawenîs)
38. Örnekköy (Miçîç)
39. Pınargözü (Xelkan)
40. Pirinçeken (Kinyaniş)
41. Salkımlı (Niziran)
42. Sarıtaş (Dirbêsan)
43. Serindere (Şîşemzîn)
44. Suüstü (Şakitan)
45. Sürekli (Bêsitkê)
46. Tatlı (Bîyan)
47. Tuğlu (Haciyan)
48. Yazılı (Talane)
49. Yeniışık (Kineriwî)
50. Yeşiltaş (Şitazin)
51. Yoncalık (Pîrzalan)
52. Yürekli (Herînk)

=== Hamlets ===
The district has 104 hamlets.

== Population ==
Population history of the district from 2007 to 2023:

Population
Year	Pop.	±%
2007	105,157	—
2010	108,546	+3.2%
2015	112,826	+3.9%
2020	119,562	+6.0%
2023	121,969	+2.0%

== Climate ==
Yüksekova has a continental mediterranean climate (Köppen: Dsb). The winter months are cold and snowy, springs are cool and wet, autumns are mild and crisp, while the summer months are pleasantly warm and dry with cool nights. The average annual temperature is 7.7 °C and precipitation here averages 757 mm.

Climate data for Yüksekova (1991–2020)
Month	Jan	Feb	Mar	Apr	May	Jun	Jul	Aug	Sep	Oct	Nov	Dec	Year
Mean daily maximum °C (°F)	−2.3 (27.9)	−0.6 (30.9)	4.7 (40.5)	11.5 (52.7)	18.0 (64.4)	24.5 (76.1)	29.1 (84.4)	29.7 (85.5)	25.4 (77.7)	18.2 (64.8)	9.4 (48.9)	0.9 (33.6)	14.1 (57.4)
Daily mean °C (°F)	−8.4 (16.9)	−6.6 (20.1)	−0.3 (31.5)	6.6 (43.9)	12.2 (54.0)	17.5 (63.5)	21.7 (71.1)	21.7 (71.1)	17.3 (63.1)	10.8 (51.4)	3.2 (37.8)	−4.8 (23.4)	7.7 (45.9)
Mean daily minimum °C (°F)	−13.6 (7.5)	−12.0 (10.4)	−4.9 (23.2)	1.9 (35.4)	6.3 (43.3)	9.6 (49.3)	13.4 (56.1)	12.9 (55.2)	8.8 (47.8)	4.1 (39.4)	−1.9 (28.6)	−9.3 (15.3)	1.3 (34.3)
Average precipitation mm (inches)	105.0 (4.13)	110.0 (4.33)	120.4 (4.74)	119.1 (4.69)	58.3 (2.30)	12.5 (0.49)	7.5 (0.30)	4.5 (0.18)	7.1 (0.28)	42.6 (1.68)	74.7 (2.94)	95.6 (3.76)	757.3 (29.81)
Average precipitation days (≥ 1.0 mm)	9.9	10.2	10.6	12.1	8.9	2.9	2.2	1.6	2.2	5.9	7.8	9.2	83.5
Average relative humidity (%)	71.1	70.0	66.1	58.1	52.2	43.4	38.5	36.3	40.2	53.0	61.8	69.9	55.1
Source: NOAA

=== Gallery ===
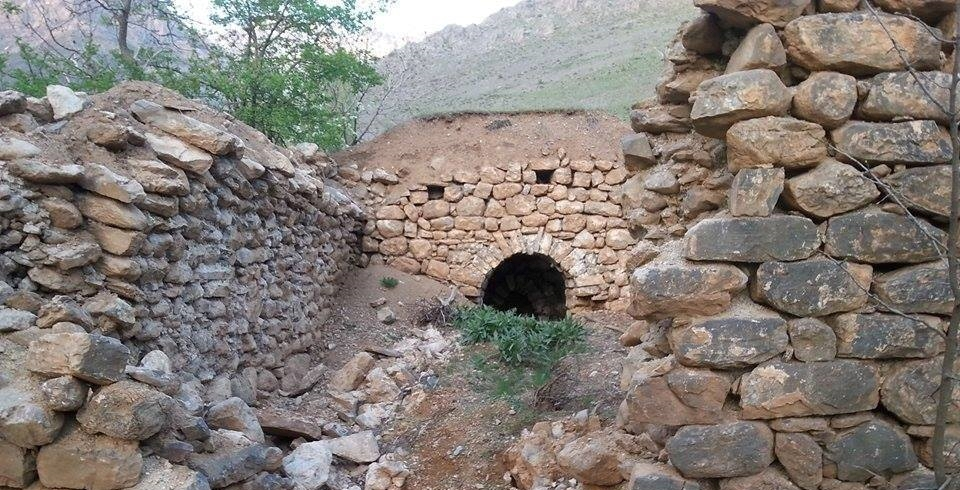
The ruins of the ancient Assyrian church of St. Mārī in the village of İkiyaka

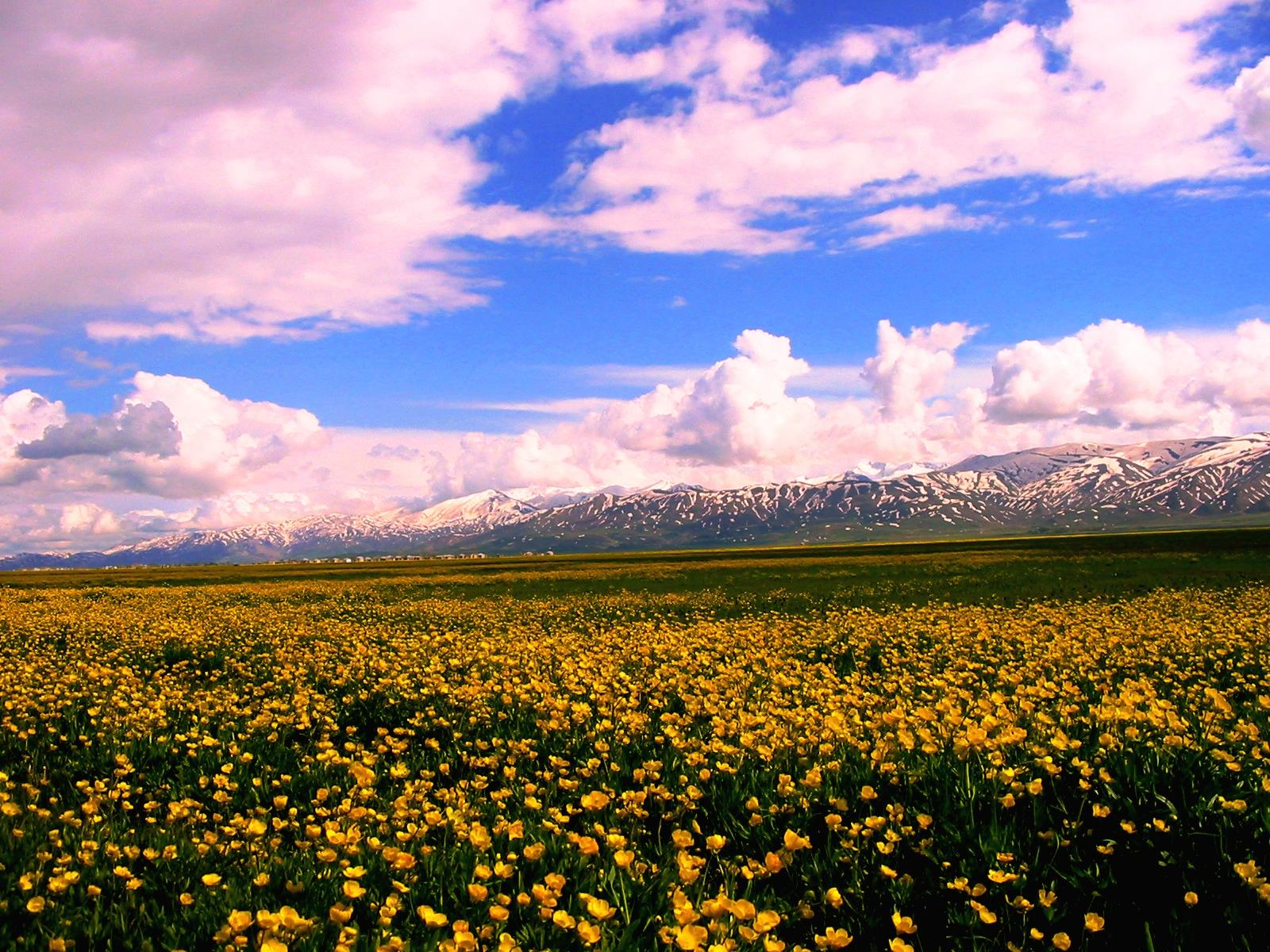
In spring

== Notable people ==
- Hacı Karay (1950–1994)
- Savaş Buldan (1961–1994)
- Abdullah Zeydan (1972–)

== See also ==
- Hakkari Cilo-Sat Mountains National Park
