= List of populated places in Bingöl Province =

Places in Turkey

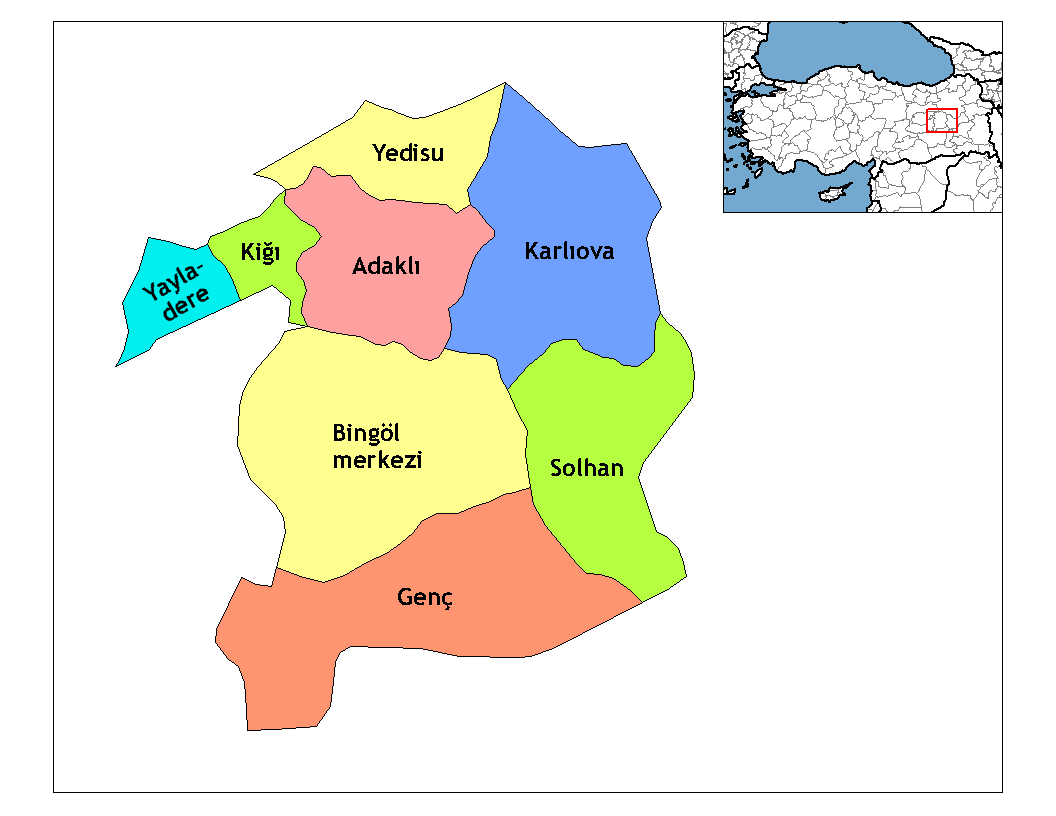
Bingöl Province

Below is the list of populated places in Bingöl Province, Turkey by the districts. First name in each district is the capital of the ilçe (district).

== Bingöl ==
- Bingöl
- Ağaçeli, Bingöl
- Ağaçyolu, Bingöl
- Akdurmuş, Bingöl
- Alatepe, Bingöl
- Alibir, Bingöl
- Alıncık, Bingöl
- Altınışık, Bingöl
- Ardıçtepe, Bingöl
- Arıcılar, Bingöl
- Aşağıakpınar, Bingöl
- Aşağıköy, Bingöl
- Bahçeli, Bingöl
- Balıklıçay, Bingöl
- Balpınar, Bingöl
- Bilaloğlu, Bingöl
- Büyüktekören, Bingöl
- Çavuşlar, Bingöl
- Çayağzı, Bingöl
- Çayboyu, Bingöl
- Çeltiksuyu, Bingöl
- Çevrimpınar, Bingöl
- Çiçekdere, Bingöl
- Çiçekyayla, Bingöl
- Çiriş Köyü, Bingöl
- Çobantaşı, Bingöl
- Çukurca, Bingöl
- Dallıtepe, Bingöl
- Dikköy, Bingöl
- Dikme, Bingöl
- Direkli, Bingöl
- Dişbudak, Bingöl
- Düzyayla, Bingöl
- Ekinyolu, Bingöl
- Elmalı, Bingöl
- Erdemli, Bingöl
- Erentepe, Bingöl
- Garip, Bingöl
- Gökçekanat, Bingöl
- Gökçeli, Bingöl
- Gökdere, Bingöl
- Göltepesi, Bingöl
- Gözeler, Bingöl
- Gözer, Bingöl
- Gümüşlü, Bingöl
- Güngören, Bingöl
- Gürpınar, Bingöl
- Güveçli, Bingöl
- Haziran, Bingöl
- Ilıcalar, Bingöl
- İncesu, Bingöl
- Kardeşler, Bingöl
- Kartal, Bingöl
- Kılçadır, Bingöl
- Kıran, Bingöl
- Kırkağıl, Bingöl
- Köklü, Bingöl
- Küçüktekören, Bingöl
- Kumgeçit, Bingöl
- Kurtuluş, Bingöl
- Kuruca, Bingöl
- Kurudere, Bingöl
- Kuşburnu, Bingöl
- Kuşkondu, Bingöl
- Oğuldere, Bingöl
- Olukpınar, Bingöl
- Ormanardı, Bingöl
- Ortaçanak, Bingöl
- Ortaköy, Bingöl
- Sancak, Bingöl
- Sancaklı, Bingöl
- Sarıçiçek, Bingöl
- Sudüğünü, Bingöl
- Sütgölü, Bingöl
- Suvaran, Bingöl
- Şabanköy, Bingöl
- Tepebaşı, Bingöl
- Topalan, Bingöl
- Uğurova, Bingöl
- Uzunsavat, Bingöl
- Üçyaka, Bingöl
- Yamaç, Bingöl
- Yaygınçayır, Bingöl
- Yazgülü, Bingöl
- Yelesen, Bingöl
- Yenibaşlar, Bingöl
- Yeniköy, Bingöl
- Yeşilköy, Bingöl
- Yolçatı, Bingöl
- Yukarıakpınar, Bingöl
- Yumaklı, Bingöl

== Adaklı ==
- Adaklı
- Akbinek, Adaklı
- Aktaş, Adaklı
- Altınevler, Adaklı
- Aysaklı, Adaklı
- Ayvadüzü, Adaklı
- Bağlarpınarı, Adaklı
- Boyalı, Adaklı
- Cevizli, Adaklı
- Çamlıca, Adaklı
- Çatma, Adaklı
- Çevreli, Adaklı
- Doğankaya, Adaklı
- Doluçay, Adaklı
- Dolutekne, Adaklı
- Elmaağaç, Adaklı
- Elmadüzü, Adaklı
- Erbaşlar, Adaklı
- Erler, Adaklı
- Gökçeli, Adaklı
- Hasbağlar, Adaklı
- Kabaçalı, Adaklı
- Kamışgölü Köyü, Adaklı
- Karaçubuk, Adaklı
- Kaynakdüzü, Adaklı
- Kırkpınar, Adaklı
- Kozlu, Adaklı
- Mercan, Adaklı
- Sarıdibek, Adaklı
- Sevkar, Adaklı
- Sütlüce, Adaklı
- Topağaçlar, Adaklı
- Yeldeğirmeni, Adaklı

== Genç ==
- Genç
- Alaaddin, Genç
- Ardıçdibi, Genç
- Balgöze, Genç
- Bayırlı, Genç
- Binekli, Genç
- Bulgurluk, Genç
- Büyükçağ, Genç
- Çamlıyurt, Genç
- Çanakçı, Genç
- Çaybaşı, Genç
- Çaytepe, Genç
- Çevirme, Genç
- Çobançeşmesi, Genç
- Dedebağı, Genç
- Dereköy, Genç
- Dikpınar, Genç
- Dilektaşı, Genç
- Direkli, Genç
- Doğanca, Genç
- Doğanevler, Genç
- Doğanlı, Genç
- Döşekkaya, Genç
- Elmagünü, Genç
- Ericek, Genç
- Eskibağ, Genç
- Gerçekli, Genç
- Geyikdere, Genç
- Gönülaçan, Genç
- Gözertepe, Genç
- Gözütok, Genç
- Günkondu, Genç
- Güzeldere, Genç
- Harmancık, Genç
- Karcı, Genç
- Kavaklı, Genç
- Keklikdere, Genç
- Kepçeli, Genç
- Koçsırtı, Genç
- Meşedalı, Genç
- Mollaibrahim, Genç
- Pınaraltı, Genç
- Sağgöze, Genç
- Sarıbudak, Genç
- Sarısaman, Genç
- Sarmakaya, Genç
- Servi, Genç
- Sırmalıoya, Genç
- Soğukpınar, Genç
- Sürekli, Genç
- Şehitköy, Genç
- Şehittepe, Genç
- Tarlabaşı, Genç
- Üçgül, Genç
- Yağızca, Genç
- Yatansöğüt, Genç
- Yaydere, Genç
- Yayla, Genç
- Yazılı, Genç
- Yazkonağı, Genç
- Yelkaya, Genç
- Yenisu, Genç
- Yeniyazı, Genç
- Yiğitbaşı, Genç
- Yolaçtı, Genç

== Karlıova ==
- Karlıova
- Aşağıyağmurlu, Karlıova
- Bağlıisa, Karlıova
- Bahçeköy, Karlıova
- Boncukgöze, Karlıova
- Cilligöl, Karlıova
- Çatak, Karlıova
- Çiftlikköy, Karlıova
- Çukurtepe, Karlıova
- Derinçay, Karlıova
- Devecik, Karlıova
- Dörtyol, Karlıova
- Geçitli, Karlıova
- Göynük, Karlıova
- Hacılar, Karlıova
- Harmantepe, Karlıova
- Hasanova, Karlıova
- Ilıpınar, Karlıova
- Kalencik, Karlıova
- Kantarkaya, Karlıova
- Karabalçık, Karlıova
- Kargapazarı, Karlıova
- Karlıca, Karlıova
- Kaşıkçı, Karlıova
- Kaynak, Karlıova
- Kaynarpınar, Karlıova
- Kazanlı, Karlıova
- Kıraçtepe, Karlıova
- Kızılağaç, Karlıova
- Kızılçubuk, Karlıova
- Kümbet, Karlıova
- Mollaşakir, Karlıova
- Ortaköy, Karlıova
- Sakaören, Karlıova
- Sarıkuşak, Karlıova
- Serpmekaya, Karlıova
- Soğukpınar, Karlıova
- Suçatı, Karlıova
- Sudurağı, Karlıova
- Taşlıçay, Karlıova
- Toklular, Karlıova
- Tuzluca, Karlıova
- Viranşehir, Karlıova
- Yeniköy, Karlıova
- Yiğitler, Karlıova
- Yoncalık, Karlıova
- Yorgançayır, Karlıova
- Yukarıyağmurlu, Karlıova

== Kiğı ==
- Kiğı
- Açıkgüney, Kiğı
- Ağaçöven, Kiğı
- Alagöz, Kiğı
- Baklalı, Kiğı
- Billice, Kiğı
- Çanakçı, Kiğı
- Çiçektepe, Kiğı
- Dallıca, Kiğı
- Darköprü, Kiğı
- Demirdöş, Kiğı
- Demirkanat, Kiğı
- Duranlar, Kiğı
- Eskikavak, Kiğı
- Eşme, Kiğı
- Güneyağıl, Kiğı
- İlbeyi, Kiğı
- Kadıköy, Kiğı
- Kuşçimeni, Kiğı
- Kutluca, Kiğı
- Nacaklı, Kiğı
- Sabırtaşı, Kiğı
- Sırmaçek, Kiğı
- Yazgünü, Kiğı
- Yukarıserinyer, Kiğı

== Solhan ==
- Solhan
- Arakonak, Solhan
- Arslanbeyli, Solhan
- Asmakaya, Solhan
- Bozkanat, Solhan
- Demirkapı, Solhan
- Dilektepe, Solhan
- Doğuyeli, Solhan
- Düzağaç, Solhan
- Elbaşı, Solhan
- Elmasırtı, Solhan
- Eşmetaş, Solhan
- Gelintepe, Solhan
- Gençtavus, Solhan
- Göksu, Solhan
- Hazarşah, Solhan
- İnandık, Solhan
- Kale, Solhan
- Kırık, Solhan
- Murat, Solhan
- Mutluca, Solhan
- Oymapınar, Solhan
- Sükyan, Solhan
- Sülünkaş, Solhan
- Şimşirpınar, Solhan
- Tarhan, Solhan
- Yenibaşak, Solhan
- Yenidal, Solhan
- Yiğitharman, Solhan

== Yayladere ==
- Yayladere
- Alınyazı, Yayladere
- Aydınlar, Yayladere
- Batıayaz, Yayladere
- Bilekkaya, Yayladere
- Çalıkağıl, Yayladere
- Çatalkaya, Yayladere
- Çayağzı, Yayladere
- Dalbasan, Yayladere
- Doğucak, Yayladere
- Gökçedal, Yayladere
- Güneşlik, Yayladere
- Günlük, Yayladere
- Kalkanlı, Yayladere
- Korlu, Yayladere
- Sürmelikoç, Yayladere
- Yavuztaş, Yayladere
- Yaylabağ, Yayladere
- Zeynelli, Yayladere

== Yedisu ==
- Yedisu
- Ayanoğlu, Yedisu
- Dinarbey, Yedisu
- Elmalı, Yedisu
- Eskibalta, Yedisu
- Gelinpertek, Yedisu
- Güzgülü, Yedisu
- Kabayel, Yedisu
- Karapolat, Yedisu
- Kaşıklı, Yedisu
- Şenköy, Yedisu
- Yağmurpınar, Yedisu
- Yeşilgöl, Yedisu
