= List of municipalities in Bingöl Province =

This is the List of municipalities in Bingöl Province, Turkey as of January 2023.

District	Municipality
Adaklı	Adaklı
Bingöl	Bingöl
Bingöl	Ilıcalar
Bingöl	Sancak
Genç	Genç
Karlıova	Karlıova
Kiğı	Kiğı
Solhan	Arakonak
Solhan	Solhan
Yayladere	Yayladere
Yedisu	Yedisu
