= Operation Murat =

Turkish military operation against the Kurdistan Workers' Party (PKK)

- Part of Kurdish–Turkish conflict
Date	23 April – 7 May 1998
Location	Triangle inside of the Diyarbakır, Bingöl and Bitlis districts.
Result	Operation successful: All PKK militants inside the triangle are neutralized

Belligerents
(Turkey) Turkish Armed Forces	PKK

Commanders and leaders
(Turkey) Nahit Şenoğul	Mahmut Gün †

Units involved
7th Corps; 8th Corps; 9th Corps; Gendarmerie General Command; City and District Region Gendarmerie Group Commands; Gendarmerie Special Operations; Village Guards; Diyarbakır 8th Main Jet Base	Amed Region Group Şenyayla Group

Strength
(Turkey) 43,000	500

Casualties and losses
(Turkey) 26 personnel killed	500+ killed or captured

Operation Murat, named after the Murat River located in the region, was an operation concentrated in the Diyarbakir, Bingol and Bitlis triangle, mostly in the mountains located inside the triangle, against the Kurdistan Workers Party (PKK), which is listed as a terrorist organization internationally by a number of states and organizations, including the United States, NATO and the EU. With the participation of 40,000 personnel and 3,000 village guards, it is the largest military operation Turkey has conducted inside of its borders. The operation lasted for two weeks and was centered on the Genç district in the province of Bingöl. It was in the area where the Turkish military destroyed two PKK camps in the past.

== Operation ==
Light infantry units were inserted in designated centers by helicopters on 23 April, on the first day, 14 battalions were landed in 14 different regions. The deployment of 5 thousand personnel to 14 regions with 18 helicopters was completed in 5 hours and contact was made with the PKK, which resulted in 77 PKK members were killed. The deployment of 40,000 personnel in the region was completed on 24 April. Security forces from many regions of Turkey were shifted to the operation, and units from Trabzon, Kars, Erzincan and Sarıkamış were dispatched to the region. The 7th Corps participated in the encirclement operation from Kulp and Muş regions, the 8th Corps from Palu, and the 9th Corps from Lice and Genç rural areas. Şenoğul said that the PKK is in a great panic and said, they cannot find food. It seems that the news that Şemdin Sakık was caught had a bad effect on their morale, he said.

The Diyarbakır-Bingöl-Bitlis Triangle was a recovery, accommodation and base area for PKK members entering from northern Iraq. From here it was distributed to possible areas. This region was the backbone of the PKK in terms of their expansion into Turkey. The whole purpose is to clear this center of PKK members and prevent passage to other regions.

The security forces had trapped 500 PKK members that were in the region, killing 112 and capturing 8 alive in 5 days. In the first 5 days of the operation in which the PKK's Şenyayla Group was destroyed, 237 shelters and warehouses were destroyed, while 40 various weapons, 9 radios, 5 tons of food and 7.5 kilos of marijuana were seized. The area in the ellipse-shaped region formed by taking Palu district of Elazığ, Genç district of Bingöl, Sarıyayla district of Muş, Kulp and Hani districts of Diyarbakır as the end points to the south of the Murat River has long been known as the recovery center after the PKK's infiltration from Northern Iraq. The organization mostly gathers in this region and disperses to different regions of Turkey from here.

On the other hand, a group of insurgents, who were determined to have infiltrated Turkey from Northern Iraq for the action, were trapped in the Cudi Mountain region of Şırnak and the Hezil Stream valley. In the air-supported operation launched, six PKK members were killed.

During the land searches in the Hezil Stream, Bilgan region, bunkers with plenty of weapons, ammunition and foodstuffs, and where insurgents made action plans, were also uncovered and rendered unusable. In Hakkari and Siirt, two insurgents who escaped from the PKK surrendered to the security forces. Operation Murat and operations in the Şırnak region continued until approximately 500 PKK militants trapped in the region were completely neutralized.

The PKK militants attacked the Raman-3 oil field belonging to Turkish Petroleum Corporation (TPAO), near the Hasankeyf Region, Batman District, at around 22:00, with rockets. In the attack, where long-barreled weapons were used, a fire broke out in the oil field. TPAO firefighters intervened in the fire. While the fire was barely brought under control in the morning, it was announced that 20 billion liras of material damage occurred according to the first determinations in the damage assessment studies.

While intensive security measures were taken around the oil field after the attack, personnel from C Task Forces from Batman Region-Gendarmerie Special Operations Group Command neutralized the fleeing PKK members, who had infiltrated the oil field after the attack and had kidnapped 3 workers; Mehmet Akman (40), Sabri Rençber (35), Samet Gezici (36), who were on duty there.

This operation in the region, where Şemdin Sakık trained thousands of PKK members by being responsible for this province that the PKK called as "Amed" for a long time, ended on 24 April 1996. PKK members nestled in three locations, especially the Musa Anter Camp in the Sağgöze region near Bingöl's Genç district, were hit by Cobra helicopters taking off from Bingöl and Diyarbakır, and the PKK nests in the region, which is covered with rocks and sometimes has deep valleys, were destroyed. During the operations, Mahmut Gün, codenamed "Celal", who replaced Şemdin Sakık, was also captured dead.

General Şenoğul gave detailed information about the operation to the journalists who attended the General Staff's press tour yesterday. Şenoğul stated that the operation had no connection with the confessions of Şemdin Sakık, who was captured, and said: "This operation had been planned since February. It is the most comprehensive military operation ever carried out within the borders of the Republic of Turkey, both in terms of the region in which it took place and the level of participation. It spreads over an area of 16 thousand square kilometers. 7th-8th-9th corps are participating in the operation. The total number of participating battalions is 76. A total of 24 generals, including 1 general, 3 lieutenant generals, 3 major generals and 17 brigadier generals, are actually in the operation."

== See also ==
- August 1986 Turkish incursion into northern Iraq
- Battle of Şırnak
- October 1992 Turkish incursion into northern Iraq
- Turkish army winter campaign of 1994–1995
- Operation Steel
- Operation Hammer (1997)
- Operation Dawn (1997)
