= Kuşburnu =

Kuşburnu may refer to:

- Kuşburnu, Bingöl
- Kuşburnu, Sur
