= Kardeşler =

Kardeşler is a Turkish word and may refer to:

== People ==
- Vildan Kardeşler (born 1998), Turkish-German women's footballer

== Places ==
- Kardeşler, Bingöl, a village in Bingöl, Turkey
- Kardeşler, Dursunbey, avillage in Dursunbey District of Balıkesir, Turkey
- Kardeşler, Zonguldak, a village in Zonguldak, Turkey
