= Yazılı =

Yazılı may refer to the following settlements in Turkey:

- Yazılı, Genç, a village in Bingöl Province
- Yazılı, Han, a neighbourhood in Alpu, Eskişehir Province
- Yazılı, Kozluk, a village in Batman Province
- Yazılı, Oğuzeli or Tüm, a neighbourhood in Gaziantep Province
- Yazılı, Şenkaya, in Erzurum Province

== See also ==
- Yazılı Canyon Nature Park, a protected area in Isparta Province, Turkey
