= Genç District =

District of Bingöl Province, Turkey

- District
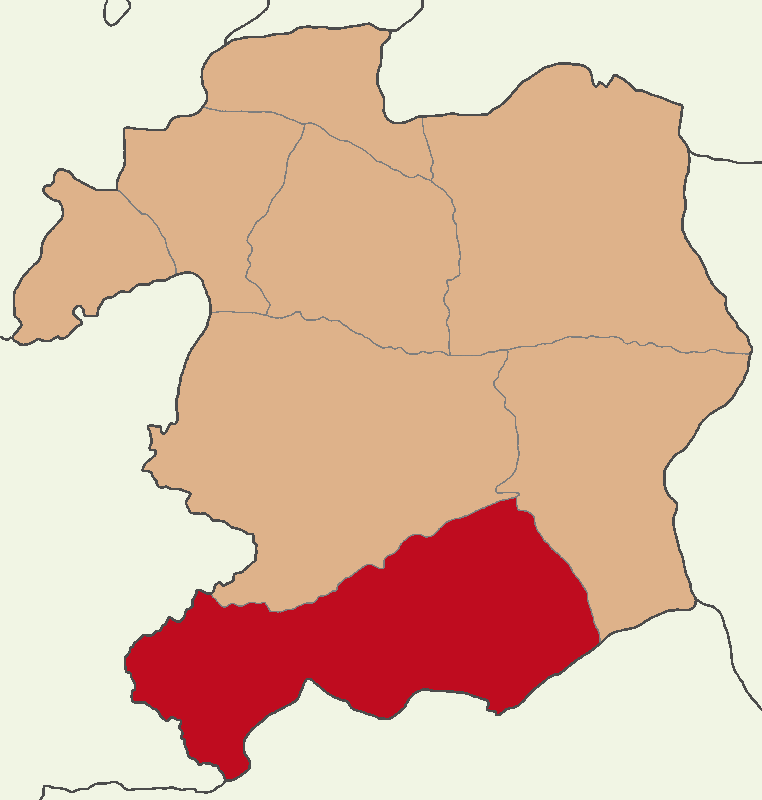
- Map showing Genç District in Bingöl Province

- Location in Turkey
- Coordinates: 38°45′N 40°34′E
- Country: Turkey
- Province: Bingöl
- Seat: Genç

Government
  - Kaymakam: Yusuf Kaptanoğlu
- Area: 1,443 km^{2} (557 sq mi)
- Population (2021): 33,929
  - Density: 24/km^{2} (61/sq mi)
- Time zone: UTC+3 (TRT)
- Website: www.genc.gov.tr

Genç District is a district of Bingöl Province of Turkey. Its seat is the town Genç. Its area is 1,443 km^{2}, and its population is 33,929 (2021).

== Composition ==
There is one municipality in Genç District:

- Genç

There are 68 villages in Genç District:

- Aktoprak
- Alaaddin
- Ardıçdibi
- Bahçebaşı
- Balgöze
- Bayırlı
- Binekli
- Bulgurluk
- Büyükçağ
- Çamlıyurt
- Çanakçı
- Çaybaşı
- Çaytepe
- Çevirme
- Çobançeşmesi
- Dedebağı
- Dereköy
- Dikpınar
- Dilektaşı
- Direkli
- Doğanca
- Doğanevler
- Doğanlı
- Doludere
- Döşekkaya
- Elmagünü
- Ericek
- Eskibağ
- Gerçekli
- Geyikdere
- Gönülaçan
- Gözertepe
- Gözütok
- Günkondu
- Güzeldere
- Harmancık
- Karcı
- Kavaklı
- Keklikdere
- Kepçeli
- Koçsırtı
- Meşedalı
- Mollaibrahim
- Pınaraltı
- Sağgöze
- Sarıbudak
- Sarısaman
- Sarmakaya
- Şehitköy
- Şehittepe
- Servi
- Sırmalıoya
- Soğukpınar
- Sürekli
- Tarlabaşı
- Üçgül
- Yağızca
- Yatansögüt
- Yaydere
- Yayla
- Yazılı
- Yazkonağı
- Yelkaya
- Yeniçevre
- Yenisu
- Yeniyazı
- Yiğitbaşı
- Yolaçtı
