= Altınışık, Bingöl =

Village in Bingöl Province, Turkey

Altınışık
- Village
- Location within Turkey
- Coordinates: 38.834°N 40.454°E
- Country: Turkey
- Province: Bingöl
- District: Bingöl
- Population (2021): 42
- Time zone: UTC+3 (TRT)

Altınışık (Kurdish: Binêzîyarî) is a village in the Bingöl District, Bingöl Province, Turkey. The village is populated by Kurds of the Kejan tribe and had a population of 42 in 2021.

The hamlet of Oymalı is attached to the village.

== See also ==
- List of populated places in Bingöl Province
