= Akımlı, Yedisu =

Village in Bingöl Province, Turkey

Akımlı
- Village
- Location within Turkey
- Coordinates: 39.426°N 40.325°E
- Country: Turkey
- Province: Bingöl
- District: Yedisu
- Population (2021): 3
- Time zone: UTC+3 (TRT)

Akımlı (Kurdish: Dînik) is a village in the Yedisu District, Bingöl Province, Turkey. The village is populated by Kurds of the Şadiyan tribe and had a population of 3 in 2021.

The hamlet of Sarıçubuk is attached to the village.
