= Yedisu District =

District of Bingöl Province, Turkey

- District
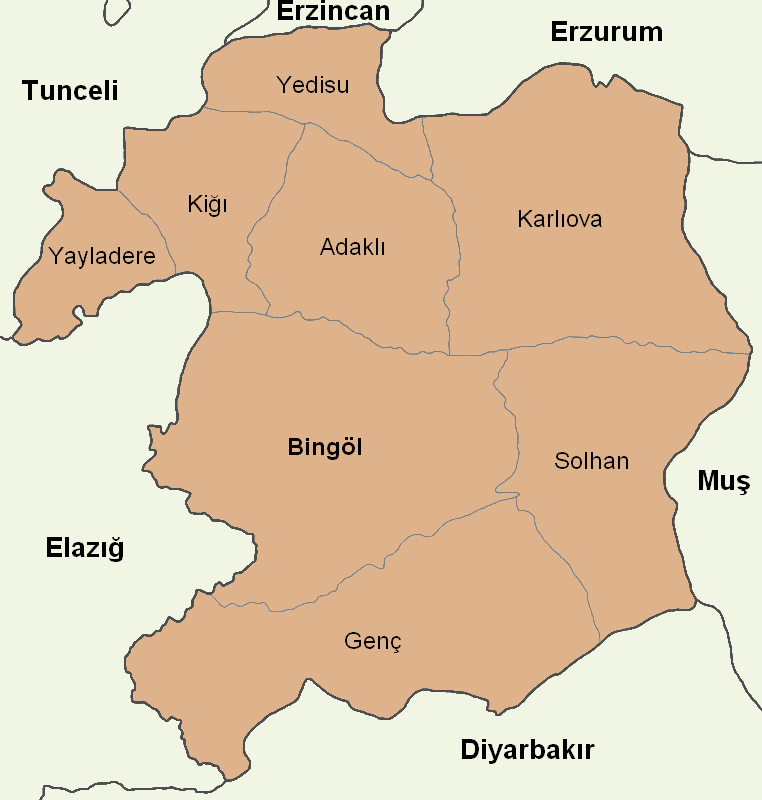
- Map showing Yedisu District in Bingöl Province
- Country: Turkey
- Province: Bingöl
- Seat: Yedisu
- Population (2021): 2,852
- Time zone: UTC+3 (TRT)
- Website: www.yedisu.gov.tr

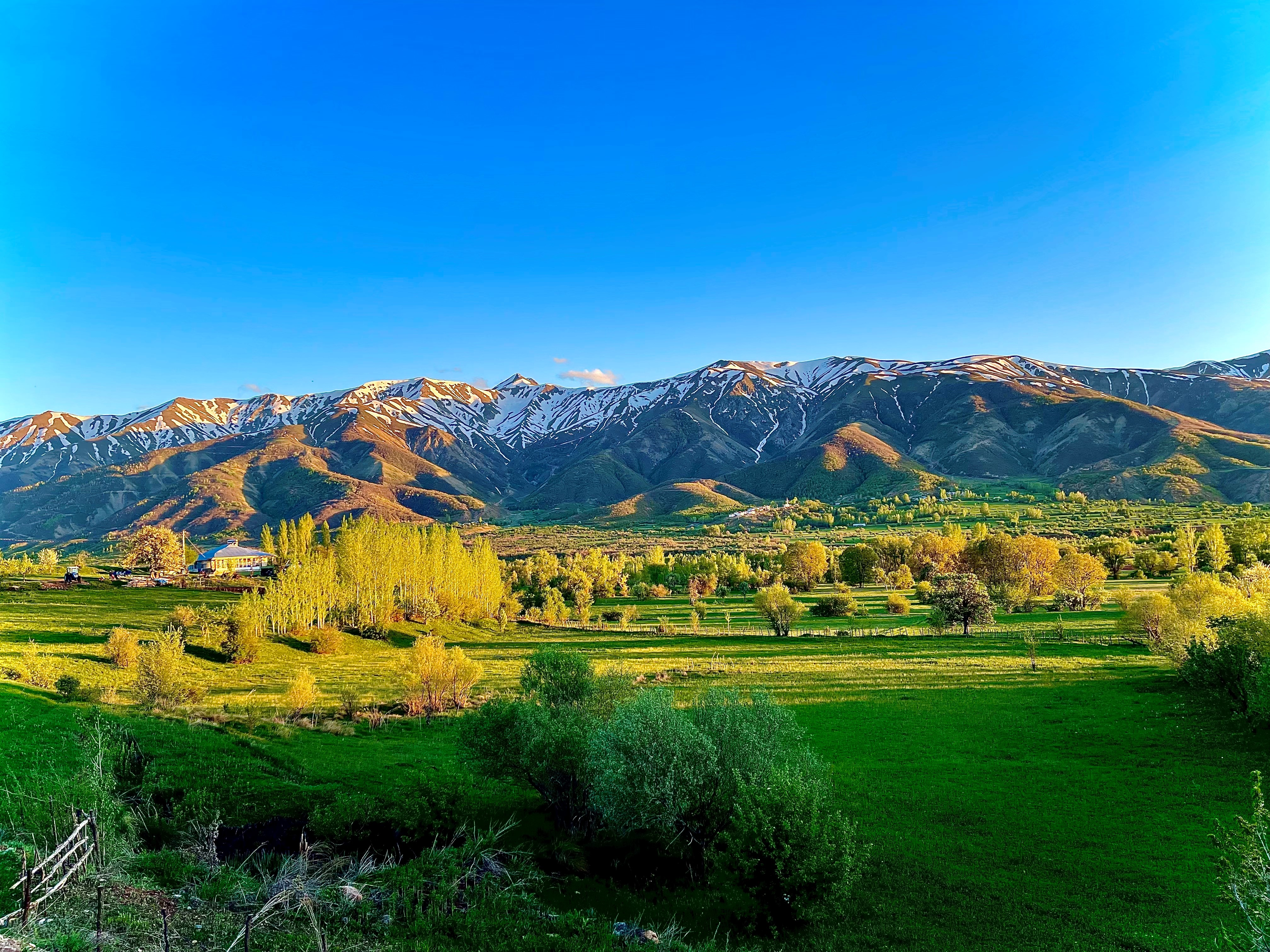
Yedisu District

Yedisu District is a district of Bingöl Province in Turkey. The town of Yedisu is the seat and the district had a population of 2,852 in 2021.

The district was established in 1990.

== Composition ==
Beside the town of Yedisu, the district encompasses thirteen villages and fifty-eight hamlets.

1. Akımlı (Dînik)
2. Ayanoğlu (Amariç)
3. Dinarbey (Dînarbey)
4. Elmalı (Elmalî)
5. Eskibalta (Himsor)
6. Gelinpertek (Pertek)
7. Güzgülü (Arnis)
8. Kabayel (Feme)
9. Karapolat
10. Kaşıklı (Musaxa)
11. Şenköy (Şên)
12. Yağmurpınar (Angig)
13. Yeşilgöl (Mozlar)
