= Emtağ, Bingöl =

Village in Bingöl Province, Turkey

Emtağ
- Village
- Location within Turkey
- Coordinates: 38.909°N 40.348°E
- Country: Turkey
- Province: Bingöl
- District: Bingöl
- Population (2021): 747
- Time zone: UTC+3 (TRT)

Emtağ (formerly Kırkağıl, Kurdish: Emtax) is a village in the Bingöl District, Bingöl Province, Turkey. The village is populated by Kurds of the Bekiran tribe and had a population of 747 in 2021.
