= Hişyar Özsoy =

Politician

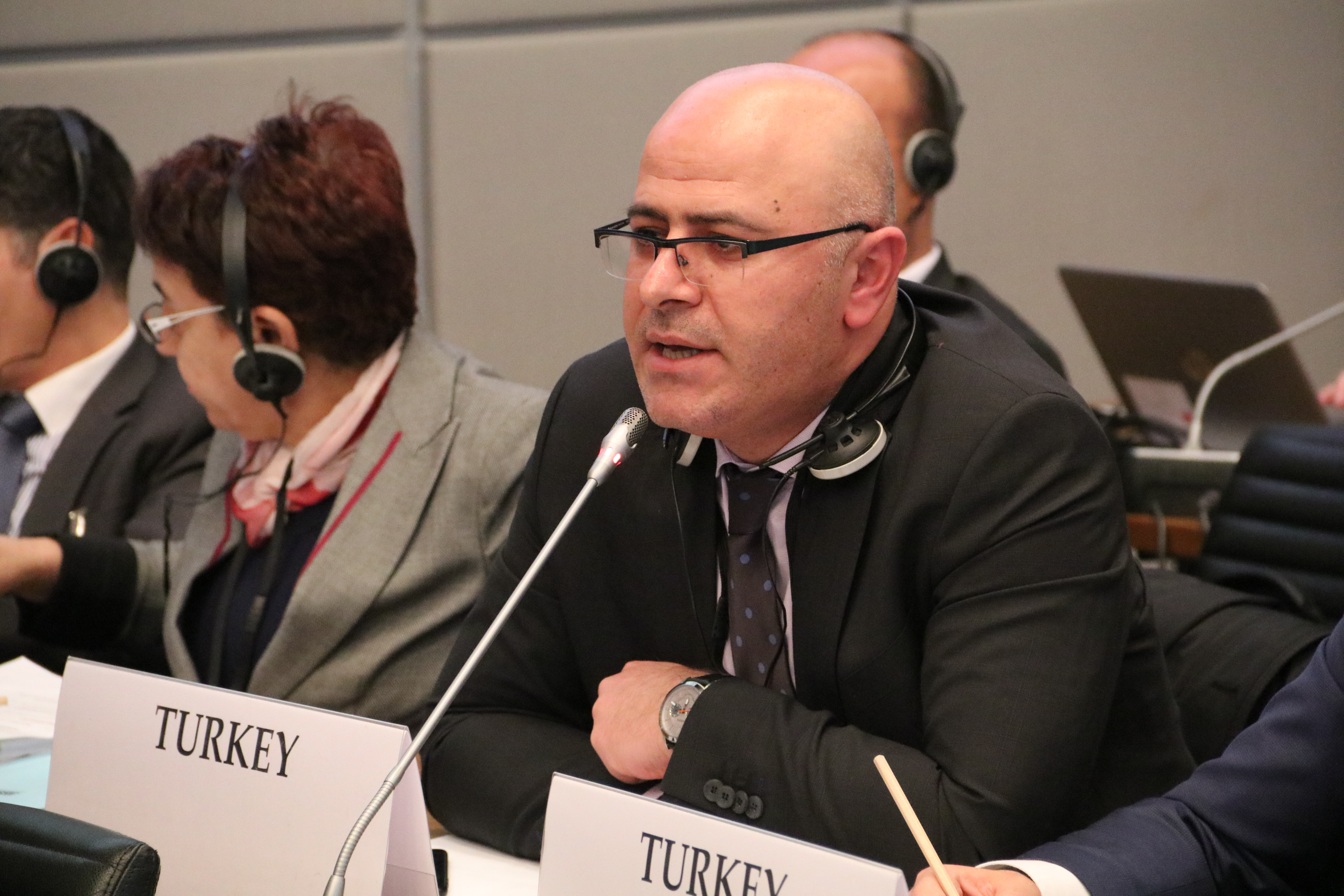
- Hisyar Özsöy at an OSCE meeting in Vienna in February 2017

Member of the Grand National Assembly of Turkey
- In office June 2015 – November 2015
- Constituency: Bingöl
- In office November 2015 – June 2018
- Constituency: Bingöl

Member of the Parliamentary Assembly of the Council of Europe
- Incumbent
- Assumed office 27 November 2015

Personal details
- Born: 26 June 1977 (age 49) Bingöl, Bingöl
- Citizenship: Turkish
- Party: HDP
- Education: University of Texas Austin
- Occupation: Lecturer, political scientist, politician

Hişyar Özsoy (born 26 June 1977, Yeniköy, Bingöl) is a Turkish politician and academic of Kurdish descent. He is a member of the Parliamentary Assembly of the Council of Europe (PACE) for the Peoples' Democratic Party (HDP)

== Education and academic career ==
Özsoy graduated with a bachelor's degree in sociology from Boğaziçi University in 2002 and earned a master's degree in 2004 and a Ph.D in Political Anthropology 2010, both from the University of Texas in Austin. From 2011 onwards he lectured at the University of Michigan. Özsoy is experienced in pedagogics and in 2012 he was chosen as a lecturer in the Thompson Center for learning and teaching of the University of Michigan.

== Political career ==
Özsoy began his political career working as a coordinator of foreign relations and a political consultant for the municipality in Diyarbakır between 2005 and 2008. He was elected as member of Grand National Assembly of Turkey in the parliamentary elections of June 2015 for Bingöl representing the HDP, and re-elected in the snap election in November 2015. He was a candidate for the mayorship in Bingöl in the local elections of March 2019, but was not elected. Özsoy has been elected into several international bodies. Since 2015 he is a member of the parliamentary group of the Organization for Security and Co-Operation in Europe (OSCE).

Since November 27, 2015 has been a member of the Parliamentary Assembly of the Council of Europe (PACE), since May 30, 2016 member of the United Left of Europe - Nordic Green Left (GUE/NGL) group and on January 21, 2019 he became the vice president of the GUE/NGL. In 2018 he was sent to the Parliamentary Assembly of the NATO. Additionally, Özsoy is a member of the board of the Progressive Alliance since November 2019.

== Political positions ==
Özsoy is the HDP vice-co chair for foreign politics since 2016. While in 2021 he was also celebrating the HDP's eight anniversary, he also contended the party was part of a longer tradition of several struggling identities in Turkey. He opposed the authoritarian Government composed by the Justice and Development Party (AKP) and the Nationalist Movement Party (MHP) led by Recep Tayyip Erdogan and Devlet Bahceli, and claims a prominent role for the HDP in the quest for democracy in Turkey.

== Legal prosecution ==
On the 17 March 2021, the State Prosecutor at the Court of Cassations of Turkey Bekir Şahin filed a lawsuit before the Constitutional Court demanding for him and 686 other HDP politicians a five-year ban to engage in Turkish politics together with a closure of the HDP due to alleged organizational links with the Kurdistan Workers' Party (PKK).
