= Dügernan, Bingöl =

Village in Bingöl Province, Turkey

Dügernan
- Village
- Location within Turkey
- Coordinates: 38.875°N 40.437°E
- Country: Turkey
- Province: Bingöl
- District: Bingöl
- Population (2021): 44
- Time zone: UTC+3 (TRT)

Dügernan (formerly Alıncık, Kurdish: Dugernan) is a village in the Bingöl District, Bingöl Province, Turkey. The village is populated by Kurds of the Az tribe and had a population of 44 in 2021.
