= Bingöl District =

District of Bingöl Province, Turkey

- District
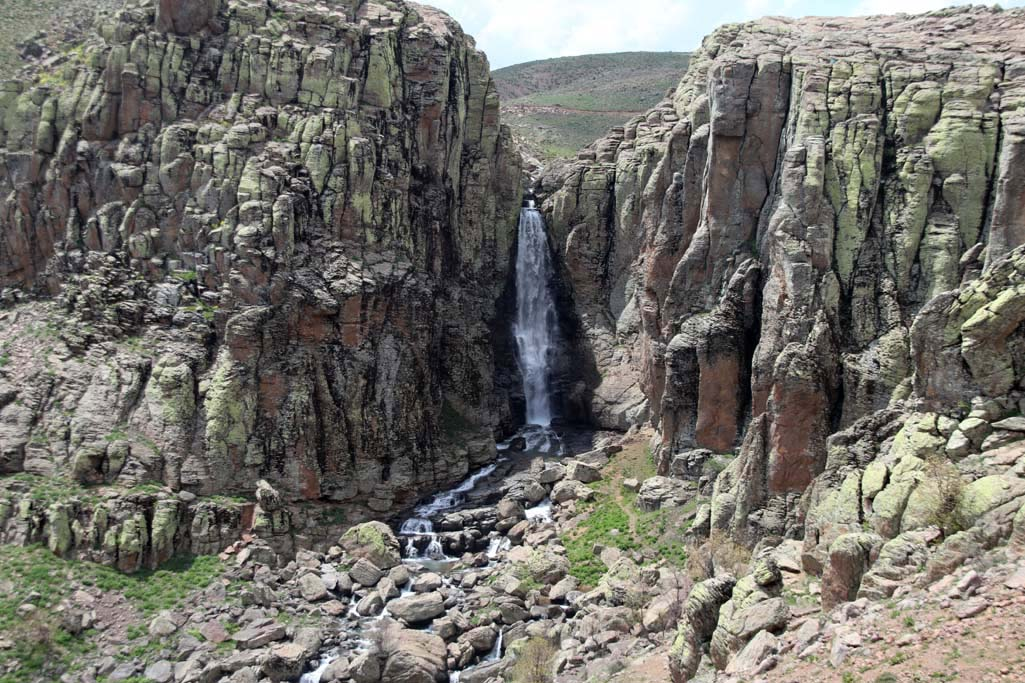

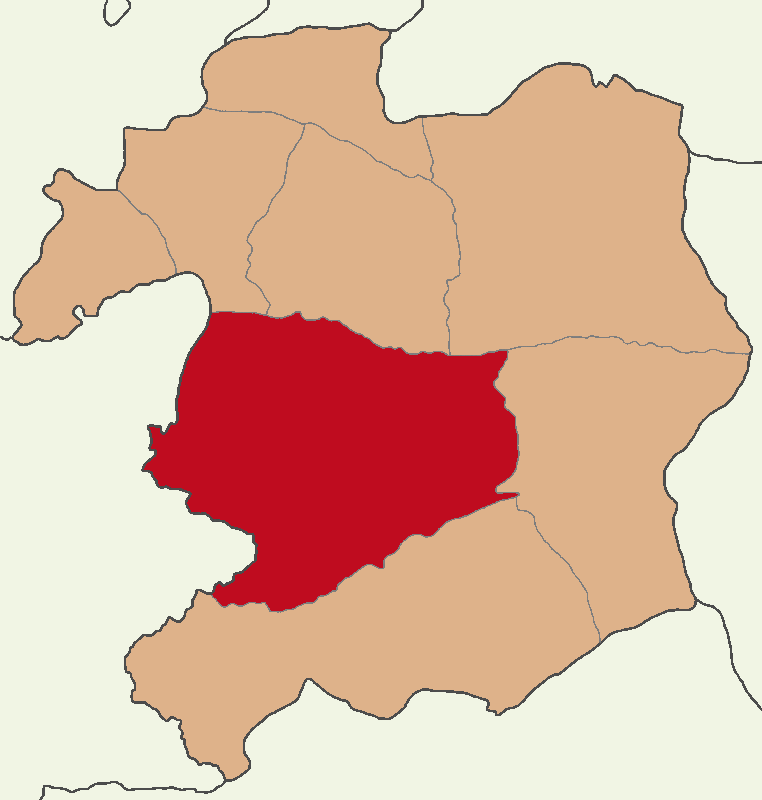
- Map showing Bingöl District in Bingöl Province

- Location within Turkey
- Coordinates: 38°53′N 40°30′E
- Country: Turkey
- Province: Bingöl
- Seat: Bingöl
- Area: 1,814 km^{2} (700 sq mi)
- Population (2022): 171,752
  - Density: 94.68/km^{2} (245.2/sq mi)
- Time zone: UTC+3 (TRT)

Bingöl District (also: Merkez, meaning "central") is a district of Bingöl Province of Turkey. Its seat is the city Bingöl. Its area is 1,814 km^{2}, the district has a population of 171,752 (2022).

== Composition ==
There are three municipalities in Bingöl District:

- Bingöl
- Ilıcalar
- Sancak

There are 88 villages in Bingöl District:

- Ağaçeli
- Ağaçyolu
- Akdurmuş
- Alatepe
- Alibir
- Altınışık
- Ardıçtepe
- Arıcılar
- Aşağıakpınar
- Aşağıköy
- Bahçeli
- Balıklıçay
- Balpınar
- Bilaloğlu
- Büyüktekören
- Çavuşlar
- Çayağzı
- Çayboyu
- Çeltiksuyu
- Çevrimpınar
- Çiçekdere
- Çiçekyayla
- Çiriş
- Çobantaşı
- Çukurca
- Dallıtepe
- Dikköy
- Dikme
- Direkli
- Dişbudak
- Dügernan
- Düzyayla
- Ekinyolu
- Elmalı
- Emtağ
- Erdemli
- Erentepe
- Garip
- Gökçekanat
- Gökçeli
- Gökdere
- Göltepesi
- Gözeler
- Gözer
- Gümüşlü
- Güngören
- Gürpınar
- Güveçli
- Haziran
- İncesu
- Kardeşler
- Kartal
- Kılçadır
- Kıran
- Köklü
- Küçüktekören
- Kumgeçit
- Kurtuluş
- Kuruca
- Kurudere
- Kuşburnu
- Kuşkondu
- Oğuldere
- Olukpınar
- Ormanardı
- Ortaçanak
- Ortaköy
- Şabanköy
- Sancaklı
- Sarıçiçek
- Sudüğünü
- Sütgölü
- Suvaran
- Tepebaşı
- Topalan
- Üçyaka
- Uğurova
- Uzunsavat
- Yamaç
- Yaygınçayır
- Yazgülü
- Yelesen
- Yenibaşlar
- Yeniköy
- Yeşilköy
- Yolçatı
- Yukarıakpınar
- Yumaklı

== Population ==
Historical population

Year	Pop.	±% p.a.
1965	43,883	—
1970	53,808	+4.16%
1975	64,810	+3.79%
1980	75,520	+3.11%
1985	86,988	+2.87%
1990	95,445	+1.87%

Year	Pop.	±% p.a.
1997	107,615	+1.73%
2007	129,885	+1.90%
2012	142,455	+1.86%
2017	157,921	+2.08%
2022	171,752	+1.69%

Source: Population censuses (1965-1997) and TÜIK (2007-2022)
