= Dikköy, Bingöl =

Village in Bingöl Province, Turkey

Dikköy
- Village
- Location in Turkey
- Coordinates: 38.840°N 40.647°E
- Country: Turkey
- Province: Bingöl
- District: Bingöl
- Population (2021): 808
- Time zone: UTC+3 (TRT)

Dikköy (Kurdish: Dik, Armenian: Դիք, romanized: Dik, Duk, Dek) is a village in the Bingöl District, Bingöl Province, Turkey. The village is populated by Kurds of the Ziktî tribe and had a population of 808 in 2021.

Dek (Dick) had 145 Armenians, 18 houses, one church before the Armenian genocide.
