= Erdemli, Bingöl =

Village in Bingöl Province, Turkey

Erdemli
- Village
- Location within Turkey
- Coordinates: 38.746°N 40.442°E
- Country: Turkey
- Province: Bingöl
- District: Bingöl
- Population (2021): 327
- Time zone: UTC+3 (TRT)

Erdemli (formerly Kıltepe, Kurdish: Gozerek) is a village in the Bingöl District, Bingöl Province, Turkey. The village is populated by Kurds of the Musyan tribe and had a population of 327 in 2021.
