= Yeniyazı, Genç =

Village in Bingöl Province, Turkey

Yeniyazı
- Village
- Location within Turkey
- Coordinates: 38.663°N 40.576°E
- Country: Turkey
- Province: Bingöl
- District: Genç
- Population (2021): 318
- Time zone: UTC+3 (TRT)

Yeniyazı (Kurdish: Bawan) is a village in the Genç District, Bingöl Province, Turkey. The village is populated by Kurds of the Botikan tribe and had a population of 318 in 2021.

The hamlets of Ağılcık, Bulgurlu, Çevreli, Demirdöven, Fırat, Hülücek, Işıkoluk, Kaldırım, Sağlık, Tepecik, Tımarlı, Yıldırım, Yumrulu and Yüceler are attached to the village.
