= Karcı, Genç =

Village in Bingöl Province, Turkey

Karcı
- Village
- Location within Turkey
- Coordinates: 38.662°N 40.449°E
- Country: Turkey
- Province: Bingöl
- District: Genç
- Population (2021): 34
- Time zone: UTC+3 (TRT)

Karcı (Kurdish: Xeyd) is a village in the Genç District, Bingöl Province, Turkey. The village is populated by Kurds and had a population of 34 in 2021.

The hamlet of Doğanca (Potyan) is attached to the village.
