= Oğuldere, Bingöl =

Village in Bingöl Province, Turkey

Oğuldere
- Village
- Location within Turkey
- Coordinates: 39.043°N 40.476°E
- Country: Turkey
- Province: Bingöl
- District: Bingöl
- Population (2021): 111
- Time zone: UTC+3 (TRT)

Oğuldere (Kurdish: Biwûn) is a village in the Bingöl District, Bingöl Province, Turkey. The village is populated by Kurds of the Hormek tribe and had a population of 111 in 2021.

The hamlets of Oymak and Uyanık are attached to the village.
