= Ormanardı, Bingöl =

Village in Bingöl Province, Turkey

Ormanardı
- Village
- Location within Turkey
- Coordinates: 38.828°N 40.513°E
- Country: Turkey
- Province: Bingöl
- District: Bingöl
- Population (2021): 434
- Time zone: UTC+3 (TRT)

Ormanardı (Kurdish: Dodan) is a village in the Bingöl District, Bingöl Province, Turkey. The village had a population of 434 in 2021.
