= Kumgeçit, Bingöl =

Village in Bingöl Province, Turkey

Kumgeçit
- Village
- Location within Turkey
- Coordinates: 38.796°N 40.617°E
- Country: Turkey
- Province: Bingöl
- District: Bingöl
- Population (2021): 453
- Time zone: UTC+3 (TRT)

Kumgeçit (Kurdish: Kurik) is a village in the Bingöl District, Bingöl Province, Turkey. The village is populated by Kurds of the Ziktî tribe and had a population of 453 in 2021.
