= Büyükçağ, Genç =

Village in Bingöl Province, Turkey

Büyükçağ
- Village
- Location within Turkey
- Coordinates: 38.607°N 40.637°E
- Country: Turkey
- Province: Bingöl
- District: Genç
- Population (2021): 68
- Time zone: UTC+3 (TRT)

Büyükçağ (Kurdish: Hêgayê Dereyî) is a village in the Genç District, Bingöl Province, Turkey. The village is populated by Kurds of the Botikan tribe and had a population of 68 in 2021.

The hamlets of Açıkalın, Aslancık, Gümüşlü, Kazancık, Köklü, Olgunlar, Üzümcük and Yuvalı are attached to the village.
