= Sarısaman, Genç =

Village in Bingöl Province, Turkey

Sarısaman
- Village
- Location within Turkey
- Coordinates: 38.719°N 40.638°E
- Country: Turkey
- Province: Bingöl
- District: Genç
- Population (2021): 130
- Time zone: UTC+3 (TRT)

Sarısaman (Kurdish: Tarçur) is a village in the Genç District, Bingöl Province, Turkey. The village is populated by Kurds of the Ziktî tribe and had a population of 130 in 2021.

The hamlets of Akbıyık, Dikmeli, Doğrualan, İkizce, Şaban, Yapraklı and Yıldızlı are attached to the village.
