= Dilektaşı, Genç =

Village in Bingöl Province, Turkey

Dilektaşı
- Village
- Location within Turkey
- Coordinates: 38.762°N 40.777°E
- Country: Turkey
- Province: Bingöl
- District: Genç
- Population (2021): 332
- Time zone: UTC+3 (TRT)

Dilektaşı (Kurdish: Muradan) is a village in the Genç District, Bingöl Province, Turkey. The village is populated by Kurds of the Ziktî tribe and had a population of 332 in 2021.

The hamlets of Bindallı, Güngörmez, Gürsu and Yeşilyurt are attached to the village.
