= Gökdere, Bingöl =

Village in Bingöl Province, Turkey

Gökdere
- Village
- Location within Turkey
- Coordinates: 38.776°N 40.391°E
- Country: Turkey
- Province: Bingöl
- District: Bingöl
- Population (2021): 311
- Time zone: UTC+3 (TRT)

Gökdere (Kurdish: Miyalan) is a village in the Bingöl District, Bingöl Province, Turkey. The village is populated by Kurds and had a population of 311 in 2021.
