= Çayboyu, Bingöl =

Village in Bingöl Province, Turkey

Çayboyu
- Village
- Location within Turkey
- Coordinates: 38.904°N 40.511°E
- Country: Turkey
- Province: Bingöl
- District: Bingöl
- Population (2021): 75
- Time zone: UTC+3 (TRT)

Çayboyu (Kurdish: Xêyd) is a village in the Bingöl District, Bingöl Province, Turkey. The village had a population of 75 in 2021.
