= Dişbudak, Bingöl =

Village in Bingöl Province, Turkey

Dişbudak
- Village
- Location within Turkey
- Coordinates: 38.773°N 40.399°E
- Country: Turkey
- Province: Bingöl
- District: Bingöl
- Population (2021): 73
- Time zone: UTC+3 (TRT)

Dişbudak is a village in the Bingöl District, Bingöl Province, Turkey. The village is populated by Kurds and had a population of 73 in 2021.
