= Dikpınar, Genç =

Village in Bingöl Province, Turkey

Dikpınar
- Village
- Location within Turkey
- Coordinates: 38.682°N 40.282°E
- Country: Turkey
- Province: Bingöl
- District: Genç
- Population (2021): 4
- Time zone: UTC+3 (TRT)

Dikpınar (Kurdish: Hajan) is a village in the Genç District, Bingöl Province, Turkey. The village is populated by Kurds and had a population of 4 in 2021.
