= Dikme, Bingöl =

Village in Bingöl Province, Turkey

Dikme
- Village
- Location within Turkey
- Coordinates: 38.911°N 40.309°E
- Country: Turkey
- Province: Bingöl
- District: Bingöl
- Population (2021): 432
- Time zone: UTC+3 (TRT)

Dikme (Kurdish: Kur) is a village in the Bingöl District, Bingöl Province, Turkey. The village is populated by Kurds of the Bekiran tribe and had a population of 432 in 2021.

The hamlet of Ayacik is attached to the village.
