= Sancaklı, Bingöl =

Village in Bingöl Province, Turkey

Sancaklı
- Village
- Location within Turkey
- Coordinates: 38.939°N 40.479°E
- Country: Turkey
- Province: Bingöl
- District: Bingöl
- Population (2021): 262
- Time zone: UTC+3 (TRT)

Sancaklı (Kurdish: Geylanê Xêlîl) is a village in the Bingöl District, Bingöl Province, Turkey. The village is populated by Kurds of the Nakşan tribe and had a population of 262 in 2021.

The hamlets of Çallar, Çukurcak and Konak are attached to the village.
