= Gözeler, Bingöl =

Village in Bingöl Province, Turkey

Gözeler
- Village
- Location within Turkey
- Coordinates: 38.846°N 40.690°E
- Country: Turkey
- Province: Bingöl
- District: Bingöl
- Population (2021): 921
- Time zone: UTC+3 (TRT)

Gözeler (Kurdish: Îbrahîma) is a village in the Bingöl District, Bingöl Province, Turkey. The village is populated by Kurds of the Ziktî tribe and has a population of 921 in 2021.

The hamlet of Kaya is attached to the village.
