= Ağaçyolu, Bingöl =

Village in Bingöl Province, Turkey

Ağaçyolu
- Village
- Location within Turkey
- Coordinates: 38.951°N 40.527°E
- Country: Turkey
- Province: Bingöl
- District: Bingöl
- Population (2021): 76
- Time zone: UTC+3 (TRT)

Ağaçyolu (Kurdish: Îskenderan) is a village in the Bingöl District, Bingöl Province, Turkey. The village is populated by Kurds and had a population of 76 in 2021.
