= Çeltiksuyu, Bingöl =

Village in Bingöl Province, Turkey

Çeltiksuyu
- Village
- Location within Turkey
- Coordinates: 38.856°N 40.576°E
- Country: Turkey
- Province: Bingöl
- District: Bingöl
- Population (2021): 1,220
- Time zone: UTC+3 (TRT)

Çeltiksuyu (Kurdish: Madrag) is a village in the Bingöl District, Bingöl Province, Turkey. The village had a population of 1,220 in 2021.

The hamlet of Nazik is attached to the village.
