= Binekli, Genç =

Village in Bingöl Province, Turkey

Binekli
- Village
- Location within Turkey
- Coordinates: 38.761°N 40.868°E
- Country: Turkey
- Province: Bingöl
- District: Genç
- Population (2021): 221
- Time zone: UTC+3 (TRT)

Binekli (Kurdish: Xilbaşan) is a village in the Genç District, Bingöl Province, Turkey. The village is populated by Kurds of the Tavz tribe and had a population of 221 in 2021.

The hamlets of Aşağıyaka, Kılıçlı and Yukarıyaka are attached to the village.
