= Yolaçtı, Genç =

Village in Bingöl Province, Turkey

Yolaçtı
- Village
- Location within Turkey
- Coordinates: 38.617°N 40.696°E
- Country: Turkey
- Province: Bingöl
- District: Genç
- Population (2021): 44
- Time zone: UTC+3 (TRT)

Yolaçtı (Kurdish: Biluwan) is a village in the Genç District, Bingöl Province, Turkey. The village is populated by Kurds and had a population of 44 in 2021.

The hamlets of Akpınar, Bekçiler, Cem, Coşkunlar, Kayacık, Kaygısız, Kaynaklı, Toklu and Yürekli are attached to the village.
