= Topalan, Bingöl =

Village in Bingöl Province, Turkey

Topalan
- Village
- Location within Turkey
- Coordinates: 38.909°N 40.430°E
- Country: Turkey
- Province: Bingöl
- District: Bingöl
- Population (2021): 112
- Time zone: UTC+3 (TRT)

Topalan is a village in the Bingöl District, Bingöl Province, Turkey. The village had a population of 112 in 2021.

The hamlet of Germik is attached to the village.
