= Ilıcalar =

Town in Bingöl Province, Turkey

- Municipality
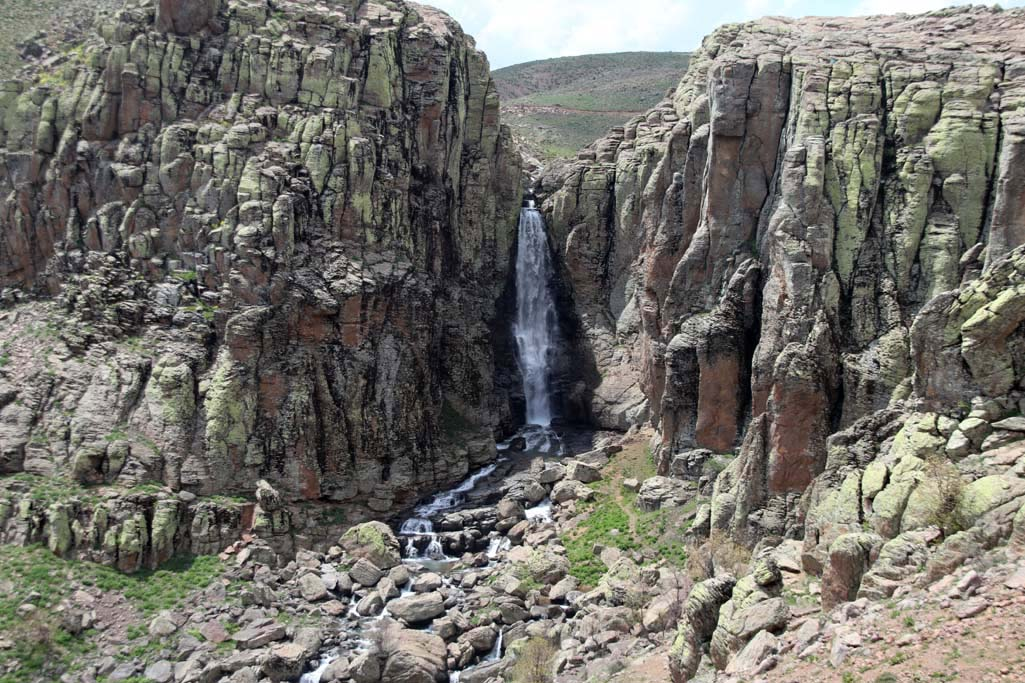
- Çır Waterfall, Ilıcalar

- Location within Turkey
- Coordinates: 38°58′52″N 40°40′37″E
- Country: Turkey
- Province: Bingöl
- District: Bingöl
- Population (2021): 3,141
- Time zone: UTC+3 (TRT)

Ilıcalar (Kurdish: Hemomon) is a town (belde) in Bingöl District, Bingöl Province, Turkey. The village is populated by Kurds and had a population of 3,141 in 2021.
