= Dedebağı, Genç =

Village in Bingöl Province, Turkey

Dedebağı
- Village
- Location within Turkey
- Coordinates: 38.680°N 40.325°E
- Country: Turkey
- Province: Bingöl
- District: Genç
- Population (2021): 23
- Time zone: UTC+3 (TRT)

Dedebağı (Kurdish: Şêxîsmalan) is a village in the Genç District, Bingöl Province, Turkey. The village is populated by Kurds and had a population of 23 in 2021.

The hamlets of Çekmece, Demirboğa, Esenler and Örencik are attached to the village.
