= Çaybaşı, Genç =

Village in Bingöl Province, Turkey

Çaybaşı
- Village
- Location within Turkey
- Coordinates: 38.512°N 40.276°E
- Country: Turkey
- Province: Bingöl
- District: Genç
- Population (2021): 140
- Time zone: UTC+3 (TRT)

Çaybaşı (Kurdish: Royê Melekan) is a village in the Genç District, Bingöl Province, Turkey. The village had a population of 140 in 2021.
