= İncesu, Bingöl =

Village in Bingöl Province, Turkey

İncesu
- Village
- Location within Turkey
- Coordinates: 38.874°N 40.642°E
- Country: Turkey
- Province: Bingöl
- District: Bingöl
- Population (2021): 487
- Time zone: UTC+3 (TRT)

İncesu (Kurdish: Derê Nazîk) is a village in the Bingöl District, Bingöl Province, Turkey. The village had a population of 487 in 2021.
