= Gümüşlü, Bingöl =

Village in Bingöl Province, Turkey

Gümüşlü
- Village
- Location within Turkey
- Coordinates: 38.762°N 40.477°E
- Country: Turkey
- Province: Bingöl
- District: Bingöl
- Population (2021): 170
- Time zone: UTC+3 (TRT)

Gümüşlü (Kurdish: Têyreg) is a village in the Bingöl District, Bingöl Province, Turkey. The village is populated by Kurds and had a population of 170 in 2021.

The hamlet of Evciler is attached to the village.
