= Uzunsavat, Bingöl =

Village in Bingöl Province, Turkey

Uzunsavat
- Village
- Location within Turkey
- Coordinates: 39.038°N 40.328°E
- Country: Turkey
- Province: Bingöl
- District: Bingöl
- Population (2021): 143
- Time zone: UTC+3 (TRT)

Uzunsavat (Kurdish: Wiswat) is a village in the Bingöl District, Bingöl Province, Turkey. The village is populated by Kurds and had a population of 143 in 2021.

The hamlet of Yayımlı is attached to the village.
