= Güveçli, Bingöl =

Village in Bingöl Province, Turkey

Güveçli
- Village
- Location within Turkey
- Coordinates: 38.846°N 40.524°E
- Country: Turkey
- Province: Bingöl
- District: Bingöl
- Population (2021): 1,268
- Time zone: UTC+3 (TRT)

Güveçli (Kurdish: Sinêwelan) is a village in the Bingöl District, Bingöl Province, Turkey. The village is populated by Kurds of the Kejan tribe and had a population of 1,268 in 2021.

The hamlets of Karaca and Yaprak are attached to the village.
