= Ardıçtepe, Bingöl =

Village in Bingöl Province, Turkey

Ardıçtepe
- Village
- Location within Turkey
- Coordinates: 38.813°N 40.512°E
- Country: Turkey
- Province: Bingöl
- District: Bingöl
- Population (2021): 146
- Time zone: UTC+3 (TRT)

Ardıçtepe (Kurdish: Nehman) is a village in the Bingöl District, Bingöl Province, Turkey. The village is populated by Kurds and had a population of 146 in 2021.

The hamlets of Kılıçkent and Numan are attached to the village.
