= Gözertepe, Genç =

Village in Bingöl Province, Turkey

Gözertepe
- Village
- Location within Turkey
- Coordinates: 38.648°N 40.321°E
- Country: Turkey
- Province: Bingöl
- District: Genç
- Population (2021): 57
- Time zone: UTC+3 (TRT)

Gözertepe (Kurdish: Awneke) is a village in the Genç District, Bingöl Province, Turkey. The village is populated by Kurds and had a population of 57 in 2021.
