= Çiçekdere, Bingöl =

Village in Bingöl Province, Turkey

Çiçekdere
- Village
- Location within Turkey
- Coordinates: 38.962°N 40.458°E
- Country: Turkey
- Province: Bingöl
- District: Bingöl
- Population (2021): 153
- Time zone: UTC+3 (TRT)

Çiçekdere (Kurdish: Gilbê) is a village in the Bingöl District, Bingöl Province, Turkey. The village is populated by Kurds of the Nakşan tribe and had a population of 153 in 2021.

The hamlets of Eskimezra, Kuşluca and Yuvacık are attached to the village.
