= Dinarbey, Yedisu =

Village in Bingöl Province, Turkey

Dinarbey
- Village
- Location within Turkey
- Coordinates: 39.371°N 40.659°E
- Country: Turkey
- Province: Bingöl
- District: Yedisu
- Population (2021): 74
- Time zone: UTC+3 (TRT)

Dinarbey (Kurdish: Dînarbey) is a village in the Yedisu District, Bingöl Province, Turkey. The village is populated by Kurds of the Şadiyan tribe and had a population of 74 in 2021.

The hamlets of Komşular and Soğucak are attached to the village.
