= Yelesen, Bingöl =

Village in Bingöl Province, Turkey

Yelesen
- Village
- Location within Turkey
- Coordinates: 38.867°N 40.323°E
- Country: Turkey
- Province: Bingöl
- District: Bingöl
- Population (2021): 493
- Time zone: UTC+3 (TRT)

Yelesen (Kurdish: Korman) is a village in the Bingöl District, Bingöl Province, Turkey. The village is populated by Kurds of the Pox tribe and had a population of 493 in 2021.
