= Kurtuluş, Bingöl =

Village in Bingöl Province, Turkey

Kurtuluş
- Village
- Location within Turkey
- Coordinates: 39.021°N 40.508°E
- Country: Turkey
- Province: Bingöl
- District: Bingöl
- Population (2021): 52
- Time zone: UTC+3 (TRT)

Kurtuluş (Kurdish: Dereyê Silî, Newala Silî) is a village in the Bingöl District, Bingöl Province, Turkey. The village is populated by Kurds and had a population of 52 in 2021.
