= Alatepe, Bingöl =

Village in Bingöl Province, Turkey

Alatepe
- Village
- Location within Turkey
- Coordinates: 39.060°N 40.758°E
- Country: Turkey
- Province: Bingöl
- District: Bingöl
- Population (2021): 567
- Time zone: UTC+3 (TRT)

Alatepe (Kurdish: Arçûg) is a village in the Bingöl District, Bingöl Province, Turkey. The village is populated by Kurds and had a population of 567 in 2021.
