= Alaaddin, Genç =

Village in Bingöl Province, Turkey

Alaaddin
- Village
- Location within Turkey
- Coordinates: 38.581°N 40.212°E
- Country: Turkey
- Province: Bingöl
- District: Genç
- Population (2021): 193
- Time zone: UTC+3 (TRT)

Alaaddin (Kurdish: Aldun) is a village in the Genç District, Bingöl Province, Turkey. The village is populated by Kurds and had a population of 193 in 2021.

The hamlets of Akçasüt, Olukbaşı and Tekecik are attached to the village.
