= Sarıçiçek, Bingöl =

Village in Bingöl Province, Turkey

Sarıçiçek
- Village
- Location within Turkey
- Coordinates: 38.885°N 40.597°E
- Country: Turkey
- Province: Bingöl
- District: Bingöl
- Population (2021): 1,939
- Time zone: UTC+3 (TRT)

Sarıçiçek (Kurdish: Tarbasan, Armenian: Դարպասան, romanized: Darbasan, Tarbasan, Tarbassan) is a village in the Bingöl District, Bingöl Province, Turkey. The village is populated by Kurds of the Kejan tribe and had a population of 1,939 in 2021.

The hamlets of Aktoprak and Hacıçayır are attached to the village.

Tarbasan had 64 Armenians before the Armenian genocide.
