= Çevirme, Genç =

Village in Bingöl Province, Turkey

Çevirme
- Village
- Location within Turkey
- Coordinates: 38.688°N 40.636°E
- Country: Turkey
- Province: Bingöl
- District: Genç
- Population (2021): 162
- Time zone: UTC+3 (TRT)

Çevirme (Kurdish: Teyran, Ulyan) is a village in the Genç District, Bingöl Province, Turkey. The village is populated by Kurds and had a population of 162 in 2021.

The hamlets of Çiçekli, Gökyazı, Kavacık, Taşdam and Ulutaş are attached to the village.
