= Kılçadır, Bingöl =

Village in Bingöl Province, Turkey

Kılçadır
- Village
- Location within Turkey
- Coordinates: 38.779°N 40.487°E
- Country: Turkey
- Province: Bingöl
- District: Bingöl
- Population (2021): 338
- Time zone: UTC+3 (TRT)

Kılçadır (Kurdish: Madrag, Armenian: Madrak, Madrag, Madrakkilotan) is a village in the Bingöl District, Bingöl Province, Turkey. The village is populated by Kurds of the Musyan tribe and had a population of 338 in 2021.

The hamlet of Özluce is attached to the village.

Madrak had 453 Armenians, 50 houses, a church (St. Kirakos), one school before the Armenian genocide.
