= Günkondu, Genç =

Village in Bingöl Province, Turkey

Günkondu
- Village
- Location within Turkey
- Coordinates: 38.621°N 40.187°E
- Country: Turkey
- Province: Bingöl
- District: Genç
- Population (2021): 232
- Time zone: UTC+3 (TRT)

Günkondu (Kurdish: Kasan) is a village in the Genç District, Bingöl Province, Turkey. The village is populated by Kurds of the Sivan tribe and had a population of 232 in 2021.

The hamlet of Yeniçağ is attached to the village.
