= Ekinyolu, Bingöl =

Village in Bingöl Province, Turkey

Ekinyolu
- Village
- Location within Turkey
- Coordinates: 38.907°N 40.575°E
- Country: Turkey
- Province: Bingöl
- District: Bingöl
- Population (2021): 1,432
- Time zone: UTC+3 (TRT)

Ekinyolu (Kurdish: Sîmsor, Armenian: Սիմսոր, romanized: Simsor) is a village in the Bingöl District, Bingöl Province, Turkey. The village is populated by Kurds and had a population of 1,432 in 2021.

The hamlets of Beyaztoprak and Köprübaşı are attached to the village.

Simsor had 54 Armenians before the Armenian genocide.
