= Harmancık, Genç =

Village in Bingöl Province, Turkey

Harmancık
- Village
- Location within Turkey
- Coordinates: 38.558°N 40.261°E
- Country: Turkey
- Province: Bingöl
- District: Genç
- Population (2021): 122
- Time zone: UTC+3 (TRT)

Harmancık (Kurdish: Rizwan) is a village in the Genç District, Bingöl Province, Turkey. The village is populated by Kurds and had a population of 122 in 2021.

The hamlet of Çetinkaya is attached to the village.
