= Balıklıçay, Bingöl =

Village in Bingöl Province, Turkey

Balıklıçay
- Village
- Location within Turkey
- Coordinates: 39.041°N 40.380°E
- Country: Turkey
- Province: Bingöl
- District: Bingöl
- Population (2021): 271
- Time zone: UTC+3 (TRT)

Balıklıçay (Kurdish: Masala) is a village in the Bingöl District, Bingöl Province, Turkey. The village is populated by Kurds of the Bekiran tribe and had a population of 271 in 2021.

The hamlets of Hasanova, Şeyhhasan, and Ünlüce (Xurxurik) are attached to the village.
