= Kaşıklı, Yedisu =

Village in Bingöl Province, Turkey

Kaşıklı
- Village
- Location within Turkey
- Coordinates: 39.482°N 40.567°E
- Country: Turkey
- Province: Bingöl
- District: Yedisu
- Population (2021): 89
- Time zone: UTC+3 (TRT)

Kaşıklı (Kurdish: Muşaxa) is a village in the Yedisu District, Bingöl Province, Turkey. The village is populated by Kurds of the Şadiyan tribe and had a population of 89 in 2021.

The hamlets of Hatunkomu, Mezraa, Yamaçlı, Yenikom and Yukarıyamaçlı are attached to the village.
