= Balgöze, Genç =

Village in Bingöl Province, Turkey

Balgöze
- Village
- Location within Turkey
- Coordinates: 38.750°N 40.720°E
- Country: Turkey
- Province: Bingöl
- District: Genç
- Population (2021): 245
- Time zone: UTC+3 (TRT)

Balgöze (Kurdish: Şîn) is a village in the Genç District, Bingöl Province, Turkey. The village is populated by Kurds of the Ziktî tribe and had a population of 245 in 2021.

The hamlets of Dutluca, Kalkanlı, Palacık and Uysal are attached to the village.
