= Şehittepe, Genç =

Village in Bingöl Province, Turkey

Şehittepe
- Village
- Location within Turkey
- Coordinates: 38.750°N 40.685°E
- Country: Turkey
- Province: Bingöl
- District: Genç
- Population (2021): 140
- Time zone: UTC+3 (TRT)

Şehittepe (Kurdish: Hajan) is a village in the Genç District, Bingöl Province, Turkey. The village is populated by Kurds of the Ziktî tribe and had a population of 140 in 2021.

The hamlet of Bellitaş is attached to the village.
