= Alibir, Bingöl =

Village in Bingöl Province, Turkey

Alibir
- Village
- Location within Turkey
- Coordinates: 38.937°N 40.425°E
- Country: Turkey
- Province: Bingöl
- District: Bingöl
- Population (2021): 153
- Time zone: UTC+3 (TRT)

Alibir (Kurdish: Elbêr) is a village in the Bingöl District, Bingöl Province, Turkey. The village is populated by Kurds of the Nakşan tribe and had a population of 153 in 2021.
