= Şabanköy, Bingöl =

Village in Bingöl Province, Turkey

Şabanköy
- Village
- Location within Turkey
- Coordinates: 38.866°N 40.353°E
- Country: Turkey
- Province: Bingöl
- District: Bingöl
- Population (2021): 276
- Time zone: UTC+3 (TRT)

Şabanköy (Kurdish: Şaban) is a village in the Bingöl District, Bingöl Province, Turkey. The village is populated by Kurds of the Reman tribe and had a population of 276 in 2021.
