= Büyüktekören, Bingöl =

Village in Bingöl Province, Turkey

Büyüktekören
- Village
- Location within Turkey
- Coordinates: 38.835°N 40.575°E
- Country: Turkey
- Province: Bingöl
- District: Bingöl
- Population (2021): 475
- Time zone: UTC+3 (TRT)

Büyüktekören (Kurdish: Zeyneba Car) is a village in the Bingöl District, Bingöl Province, Turkey. The village is populated by Kurds of the Az tribe and had a population of 475 in 2021.
