= Yağızca, Genç =

Village in Bingöl Province, Turkey

Yağızca
- Village
- Location within Turkey
- Coordinates: 38.819°N 40.772°E
- Country: Turkey
- Province: Bingöl
- District: Genç
- Population (2021): 294
- Time zone: UTC+3 (TRT)

Yağızca (Kurdish: Şemsan) is a village in the Genç District, Bingöl Province, Turkey. The village is populated by Kurds of the Ziktî tribe and had a population of 294 in 2021.

The hamlets of Aydoğmuş, Başmaklı, Gülgör, Güreşli, İkizkuyu and Oğlaktepe are attached to the village.
