= Döşekkaya, Genç =

Village in Bingöl Province, Turkey

Döşekkaya
- Village
- Location within Turkey
- Coordinates: 38.633°N 40.383°E
- Country: Turkey
- Province: Bingöl
- District: Genç
- Population (2021): 38
- Time zone: UTC+3 (TRT)

Döşekkaya (Kurdish: Mehmudan) is a village in the Genç District, Bingöl Province, Turkey. The village is populated by Kurds and had a population of 38 in 2021.

The hamlets of Belceğiz and Güllüce are attached to the village.
