= Elmagünü, Genç =

Village in Bingöl Province, Turkey

Elmagünü
- Village
- Location within Turkey
- Coordinates: 38.745°N 40.930°E
- Country: Turkey
- Province: Bingöl
- District: Genç
- Population (2021): 149
- Time zone: UTC+3 (TRT)

Elmagünü (Kurdish: Momedan) is a village in the Genç District, Bingöl Province, Turkey. The village is populated by Kurds of the Tavz tribe and had a population of 149 in 2021.

The hamlets of Aşağıyaka, Kılıçlı and Yukarıyaka are attached to the village.
