= Yazkonağı, Genç =

Village in Bingöl Province, Turkey

Yazkonağı
- Village
- Location within Turkey
- Coordinates: 38.654°N 40.728°E
- Country: Turkey
- Province: Bingöl
- District: Genç
- Population (2021): 188
- Time zone: UTC+3 (TRT)

Yazkonağı (Kurdish: Şatos) is a village in the Genç District, Bingöl Province, Turkey. The village is populated by Kurds and had a population of 188 in 2021.

The hamlets of Büyükköy, Çalışlar, Derman, Dikmetaş, Doğanlar, Kanatlı, Kaymakçı, Örtülü, Özkaya, Sarısu, Varlık, Yazıcık and Yünlüce are attached to the village.
