= Şenköy, Yedisu =

Village in Bingöl Province, Turkey

Şenköy
- Village
- Location within Turkey
- Coordinates: 39.413°N 40.532°E
- Country: Turkey
- Province: Bingöl
- District: Yedisu
- Population (2021): 53
- Time zone: UTC+3 (TRT)

Şenköy (Kurdish: Şên) is a village in the Yedisu District, Bingöl Province, Turkey. The village is populated by Kurds of the Canbegan tribe and had a population of 53 in 2021.
