= Güngören, Bingöl =

Village in Bingöl Province, Turkey

Güngören
- Village
- Location within Turkey
- Coordinates: 39.078°N 40.292°E
- Country: Turkey
- Province: Bingöl
- District: Bingöl
- Population (2021): 149
- Time zone: UTC+3 (TRT)

Güngören (Kurdish: Mezracûx) is a village in the Bingöl District, Bingöl Province, Turkey. The village is populated by Kurds of the Bekiran tribe and had a population of 149 in 2021.
