= Elmalı, Yedisu =

Village in Bingöl Province, Turkey

Elmalı
- Village
- Location within Turkey
- Coordinates: 39.381°N 40.643°E
- Country: Turkey
- Province: Bingöl
- District: Yedisu
- Population (2021): 294
- Time zone: UTC+3 (TRT)

Elmalı (Kurdish: Elmalî) is a village in the Yedisu District, Bingöl Province, Turkey. The village is populated by Kurds of the Şadiyan tribe and had a population of 294 in 2021.

The hamlets of Aşağı Dikmen, Dikan, Gazi, Gelincim, İbiş, Karburun, Kılıçlı, Ömürlü, Yazpınar, Yukarı Dikman and Yumrukaya are attached to the village.
