= Düzyayla, Bingöl =

Village in Bingöl Province, Turkey

Düzyayla
- Village
- Location within Turkey
- Coordinates: 38.805°N 40.481°E
- Country: Turkey
- Province: Bingöl
- District: Bingöl
- Population (2021): 77
- Time zone: UTC+3 (TRT)

Düzyayla (Kurdish: Gewran) is a village in the Bingöl District, Bingöl Province, Turkey. The village is populated by Kurds of the Musyan tribe and had a population of 77 in 2021.
