= Eskibalta, Yedisu =

Village in Bingöl Province, Turkey

Eskibalta
- Village
- Location within Turkey
- Coordinates: 39.458°N 40.468°E
- Country: Turkey
- Province: Bingöl
- District: Yedisu
- Population (2021): 122
- Time zone: UTC+3 (TRT)

Eskibalta (Kurdish: Himsor) is a village in the Yedisu District, Bingöl Province, Turkey. The village is populated by Circassians and Kurds and had a population of 122 in 2021.
