= Yatansöğüt, Genç =

Village in Bingöl Province, Turkey

Yatansöğüt
- Village
- Location within Turkey
- Coordinates: 38.617°N 40.231°E
- Country: Turkey
- Province: Bingöl
- District: Genç
- Population (2021): 299
- Time zone: UTC+3 (TRT)

Yatansöğüt (Kurdish: Fatrakum) is a village in the Genç District, Bingöl Province, Turkey. The village is populated by Kurds and had a population of 299 in 2021.

The hamlet of Oyuktaş is attached to the village.
