= Kavaklı, Genç =

Village in Bingöl Province, Turkey

Kavaklı
- Village
- Location within Turkey
- Coordinates: 38.645°N 40.339°E
- Country: Turkey
- Province: Bingöl
- District: Genç
- Population (2021): 106
- Time zone: UTC+3 (TRT)

Kavaklı (Kurdish: Xiraba) is a village in the Genç District, Bingöl Province, Turkey. The village is populated by Kurds and had a population of 106 in 2021.

The hamlets of Çomak and Ekinli are attached to the village.
