= Koçsırtı, Genç =

Village in Bingöl Province, Turkey

Koçsırtı
- Village
- Location within Turkey
- Coordinates: 38.780°N 40.825°E
- Country: Turkey
- Province: Bingöl
- District: Genç
- Population (2021): 294
- Time zone: UTC+3 (TRT)

Koçsırtı (Kurdish: Sêfan) is a village in the Genç District, Bingöl Province, Turkey. The village is populated by Kurds of the Ziktî tribe and had a population of 294 in 2021.

The hamlets of Gözlüce (Tüğerin), Küçük, Otluca, Özyurt and Yumurtalı are attached to the village.
