= Gözer, Bingöl =

Village in Bingöl Province, Turkey

Gözer
- Village
- Location within Turkey
- Coordinates: 38.947°N 40.560°E
- Country: Turkey
- Province: Bingöl
- District: Bingöl
- Population (2021): 592
- Time zone: UTC+3 (TRT)

Gözer (Kurdish: Şênig) is a village in the Bingöl District, Bingöl Province, Turkey. The village is populated by Kurds and had a population of 592 in 2021.
