= Uğurova, Bingöl =

Village in Bingöl Province, Turkey

Uğurova
- Village
- Location within Turkey
- Coordinates: 39.022°N 40.237°E
- Country: Turkey
- Province: Bingöl
- District: Bingöl
- Population (2021): 89
- Time zone: UTC+3 (TRT)

Uğurova (Kurdish: Wexrebasî) is a village in the Bingöl District, Bingöl Province, Turkey. The village is populated by Kurds and had a population of 89 in 2021.
