= Aşağıakpınar, Bingöl =

Village in Bingöl Province, Turkey

Aşağıakpınar
- Village
- Location within Turkey
- Coordinates: 38.860°N 40.475°E
- Country: Turkey
- Province: Bingöl
- District: Bingöl
- Population (2021): 1,102
- Time zone: UTC+3 (TRT)

Aşağıakpınar (Kurdish: Wusfon) is a village in the Bingöl District, Bingöl Province, Turkey. The village is populated by Kurds of the Az tribe and had a population of 1,102 in 2021.

The hamlet of Eskiköy is attached to the village.
