= Bayırlı, Genç =

Village in Bingöl Province, Turkey

Bayırlı
- Village
- Location within Turkey
- Coordinates: 38.780°N 40.866°E
- Country: Turkey
- Province: Bingöl
- District: Genç
- Population (2021): 279
- Time zone: UTC+3 (TRT)

Bayırlı (Kurdish: Mezraya Solaxan) is a village in the Genç District, Bingöl Province, Turkey. The village is populated by Kurds of the Tavz tribe and had a population of 279 in 2021.

The hamlets of Alancık, Güvercinli, Kumluca and Küçük Mezra are attached to the village.
