= Ardıçdibi, Genç =

Village in Bingöl Province, Turkey

Ardıçdibi
- Village
- Location within Turkey
- Coordinates: 38.763°N 40.620°E
- Country: Turkey
- Province: Bingöl
- District: Genç
- Population (2021): 126
- Time zone: UTC+3 (TRT)

Ardıçdibi (Kurdish: Arkel) is a village in the Genç District, Bingöl Province, Turkey. The village is populated by Kurds of the Ziktî tribe and had a population of 126 in 2021.

The hamlets of Aliçapan and Sağan are attached to the village.
