= Kuruca, Bingöl =

Village in Bingöl Province, Turkey

Kuruca
- Village
- Location within Turkey
- Coordinates: 38.946°N 40.265°E
- Country: Turkey
- Province: Bingöl
- District: Bingöl
- Population (2021): 299
- Time zone: UTC+3 (TRT)

Kuruca (Kurdish: Xezik) is a village in the Bingöl District, Bingöl Province, Turkey. The village is populated by Kurds of the Xeylan tribe and had a population of 299 in 2021.
