= Dereköy, Genç =

Village in Bingöl Province, Turkey

Dereköy
- Village
- Location within Turkey
- Coordinates: 38.754°N 40.671°E
- Country: Turkey
- Province: Bingöl
- District: Genç
- Population (2021): 71
- Time zone: UTC+3 (TRT)

Dereköy (Kurdish: Bazen) is a village in the Genç District, Bingöl Province, Turkey. The village had a population of 71 in 2021.

The hamlets of Aşağı Biçer, Kurukaya and Yoğurtlu are attached to the village.
