= Güzgülü, Yedisu =

Village in Bingöl Province, Turkey

Güzgülü
- Village
- Location within Turkey
- Coordinates: 39.426°N 40.487°E
- Country: Turkey
- Province: Bingöl
- District: Yedisu
- Population (2021): 227
- Time zone: UTC+3 (TRT)

Güzgülü (Kurdish: Arnis) is a village in the Yedisu District, Bingöl Province, Turkey. The village is populated by Circassians (Abzakh) and by Kurds of the Abdalan, Çarekan, Lolan and Şadiyan tribes. It had a population of 227 in 2021.

The hamlets of Çaltepe, Çayağzı, Dilek, Doluca, Geyikli, Güleç, Harmanlı, Konuklu, Koyuncular, Kömürlü, Köse and Yurtiçi are attached to the village.
