= Üçgül, Genç =

Village in Bingöl Province, Turkey

Üçgül
- Village
- Location within Turkey
- Coordinates: 38.647°N 40.409°E
- Country: Turkey
- Province: Bingöl
- District: Genç
- Population (2021): 118
- Time zone: UTC+3 (TRT)

Üçgül (Kurdish: Hesenan) is a village in the Genç District, Bingöl Province, Turkey. The village is populated by Kurds and had a population of 118 in 2021.

The hamlets of Arıtaş, Boğaziçi, Büyükköy, Çobankaya, Gelincik, Göçebağ, İbrahimler and Sancaklı are attached to the village.
