= Yamaç, Bingöl =

Village in Bingöl Province, Turkey

Yamaç
- Village
- Location within Turkey
- Coordinates: 38.775°N 40.441°E
- Country: Turkey
- Province: Bingöl
- District: Bingöl
- Population (2021): 315
- Time zone: UTC+3 (TRT)

Yamaç (Kurdish: Musyan) is a village in the Bingöl District, Bingöl Province, Turkey. The village is populated by Kurds of the Musyan tribe and had a population of 315 in 2021.
