= Yeniköy, Bingöl =

Village in Bingöl Province, Turkey

Yeniköy
- Village
- Location within Turkey
- Coordinates: 38.856°N 40.621°E
- Country: Turkey
- Province: Bingöl
- District: Bingöl
- Population (2021): 552
- Time zone: UTC+3 (TRT)

Yeniköy (Kurdish: Çilkanî) is a village in the Bingöl District, Bingöl Province, Turkey. The village had a population of 552 in 2021.

== Notable people ==
- Hişyar Özsoy
