= Yumaklı, Bingöl =

Village in Bingöl Province, Turkey

Yumaklı
- Village
- Location within Turkey
- Coordinates: 38.757°N 40.351°E
- Country: Turkey
- Province: Bingöl
- District: Bingöl
- Population (2021): 432
- Time zone: UTC+3 (TRT)

Yumaklı (Kurdish: Pakûnî) is a village in the Bingöl District, Bingöl Province, Turkey. The village is populated by Kurds and had a population of 432 in 2021.

The hamlets of Damlacık and Polatlı are attached to the village.
