= Yağmurpınar, Yedisu =

Village in Bingöl Province, Turkey

Yağmurpınar
- Village
- Location within Turkey
- Coordinates: 39.477°N 40.541°E
- Country: Turkey
- Province: Bingöl
- District: Yedisu
- Population (2021): 48
- Time zone: UTC+3 (TRT)

Yağmurpınar (Kurdish: Angix) is a village in the Yedisu District, Bingöl Province, Turkey. The village is populated by Kurds of the Şadiyan tribe and had a population of 48 in 2021.

The hamlet of Angig mezrası is attached to the village.
