= Yeşilgöl, Yedisu =

Village in Bingöl Province, Turkey

Yeşilgöl
- Village
- Location within Turkey
- Coordinates: 39.425°N 40.599°E
- Country: Turkey
- Province: Bingöl
- District: Yedisu
- Population (2021): 122
- Time zone: UTC+3 (TRT)

Yeşilgöl (Kurdish: Moz) is a village in the Yedisu District, Bingöl Province, Turkey. The village is populated by Kurds of the Şadiyan tribe and had a population of 122 in 2021.

The hamlets of Eskipınar and Hüseyinkomu are attached to the village.
