= Yayla, Genç =

Village in Bingöl Province, Turkey

Yayla
- Village
- Location within Turkey
- Coordinates: 38.627°N 40.509°E
- Country: Turkey
- Province: Bingöl
- District: Genç
- Population (2021): 759
- Time zone: UTC+3 (TRT)

Yayla (Kurdish: Warê Merge) is a village in the Genç District, Bingöl Province, Turkey. The village is populated by Kurds and had a population of 759 in 2021.

The hamlets of Demirlibağ, Doğrular, Ekincik, Ekmekli, Karaoluk, Koyunlu, Kümelik, Ulaklı, Ürünlü and Yoğuntaş are attached to the village.
