= Yazgülü, Bingöl =

Village in Bingöl Province, Turkey

Yazgülü
- Village
- Location within Turkey
- Coordinates: 39.015°N 40.303°E
- Country: Turkey
- Province: Bingöl
- District: Bingöl
- Population (2021): 170
- Time zone: UTC+3 (TRT)

Yazgülü (Kurdish: Qerweliyûnê Corî) is a village in the Bingöl District, Bingöl Province, Turkey. The village is populated by Kurds and had a population of 170 in 2021.
