= Haziran, Bingöl =

Village in Bingöl Province, Turkey

Haziran
- Village
- Location within Turkey
- Coordinates: 38.828°N 40.441°E
- Country: Turkey
- Province: Bingöl
- District: Bingöl
- Population (2021): 152
- Time zone: UTC+3 (TRT)

Haziran (Kurdish: Hezêran) is a village in the Bingöl District, Bingöl Province, Turkey. The village is populated by Kurds of the Az tribe and had a population of 152 in 2021.

The hamlet of Ekincik is attached to the village.
