= Kartal, Bingöl =

Village in Bingöl Province, Turkey

Kartal
- Village
- Location within Turkey
- Coordinates: 38.969°N 40.423°E
- Country: Turkey
- Province: Bingöl
- District: Bingöl
- Population (2021): 218
- Time zone: UTC+3 (TRT)

Kartal (Kurdish: Sîrin) is a village in the Bingöl District, Bingöl Province, Turkey. The village is populated by Kurds of the Nakşan tribe and had a population of 218 in 2021.
