= Ağaçeli, Bingöl =

Village in Bingöl Province, Turkey

Ağaçeli
- Village
- Location within Turkey
- Coordinates: 38.931°N 40.713°E
- Country: Turkey
- Province: Bingöl
- District: Bingöl
- Population (2021): 1,127
- Time zone: UTC+3 (TRT)

Ağaçeli (Kurdish: Parmuk) is a village in the Bingöl District, Bingöl Province, Turkey. The village is populated by Kurds and had a population of 1,127 in 2021.
