= Kepçeli, Genç =

Village in Bingöl Province, Turkey

Kepçeli
- Village
- Location within Turkey
- Coordinates: 38.827°N 40.827°E
- Country: Turkey
- Province: Bingöl
- District: Genç
- Population (2021): 354
- Time zone: UTC+3 (TRT)

Kepçeli (Kurdish: Girnos) is a village in the Genç District, Bingöl Province, Turkey. The village is populated by Kurds of the Ziktî tribe and had a population of 354 in 2021.

The hamlets of Durmuşlu, Eskiköy, İmeceli, Kaledibi, Kayasırtı, Kurucu, Kuyucak, Pınarbaşı and Temelli are attached to the village.
