= Geyikdere, Genç =

Village in Bingöl Province, Turkey

Geyikdere
- Village
- Location within Turkey
- Coordinates: 38.645°N 40.882°E
- Country: Turkey
- Province: Bingöl
- District: Genç
- Population (2021): 221
- Time zone: UTC+3 (TRT)

Geyikdere (Kurdish: Azgilêr) is a village in the Genç District, Bingöl Province, Turkey. The village is populated by Kurds of the Tavz tribe and had a population of 221 in 2021.

The hamlets of Alatlı, Arapcık, Bayırcık, Erdoğdu, Erenler, Ericek, Karabulut, Konuklu, Soluca, Umurlu, Uyanık, Üçkardeş, Yamaçlı and Yuvaklı are attached to the village.
