= Gelinpertek, Yedisu =

Village in Bingöl Province, Turkey

Gelinpertek
- Village
- Location within Turkey
- Coordinates: 39.473°N 40.392°E
- Country: Turkey
- Province: Bingöl
- District: Yedisu
- Population (2021): 48
- Time zone: UTC+3 (TRT)

Gelinpertek (Kurdish: Pertek) is a village in the Yedisu District, Bingöl Province, Turkey. The village is populated by Kurds of the Çarekan tribe and had a population of 48 in 2021.

The hamlets of Aktaşlyı, Çiçekli, Göl and Onbaşılar are attached to the village.
