= Meşedalı, Genç =

Village in Bingöl Province, Turkey

Meşedalı
- Village
- Location within Turkey
- Coordinates: 38.785°N 40.631°E
- Country: Turkey
- Province: Bingöl
- District: Genç
- Population (2021): 210
- Time zone: UTC+3 (TRT)

Meşedalı (Kurdish: Modan) is a village in the Genç District, Bingöl Province, Turkey. The village is populated by Kurds and had a population of 210 in 2021.

The hamlets of Alımlı, Korkut, Kovacık, Mutluca and Yorulmaz are attached to the village.
