= Çanakçı, Genç =

Village in Bingöl Province, Turkey

Çanakçı
- Village
- Location within Turkey
- Coordinates: 38.765°N 40.740°E
- Country: Turkey
- Province: Bingöl
- District: Genç
- Population (2021): 228
- Time zone: UTC+3 (TRT)

Çanakçı (Kurdish: Canser) is a village in the Genç District, Bingöl Province, Turkey. The village is populated by Kurds of the Ziktî tribe and had a population of 228 in 2021.

The hamlets of Keskin, Kılıçlı, Osmanlar, Özlüce, Soğanlı and Yardım are attached to the village.
