= Sarıbudak, Genç =

Village in Bingöl Province, Turkey

Sarıbudak
- Village
- Location within Turkey
- Coordinates: 38.521°N 40.319°E
- Country: Turkey
- Province: Bingöl
- District: Genç
- Population (2021): 95
- Time zone: UTC+3 (TRT)

Sarıbudak (Kurdish: Melekan) is a village in the Genç District, Bingöl Province, Turkey. The village is populated by Kurds and had a population of 95 in 2021.

The hamlet of Saklıca is attached to the village.
