= Soğukpınar, Genç =

Village in Bingöl Province, Turkey

Soğukpınar
- Village
- Location within Turkey
- Coordinates: 38.710°N 40.452°E
- Country: Turkey
- Province: Bingöl
- District: Genç
- Population (2021): 34
- Time zone: UTC+3 (TRT)

Soğukpınar (Kurdish: Vartax) is a village in the Genç District, Bingöl Province, Turkey. The village had a population of 34 in 2021.

The hamlets of Direkli, Kozankaya and Örencik are attached to the village.
