= Çevrimpınar, Bingöl =

Village in Bingöl Province, Turkey

Çevrimpınar
- Village
- Location within Turkey
- Coordinates: 38.939°N 40.371°E
- Country: Turkey
- Province: Bingöl
- District: Bingöl
- Population (2021): 401
- Time zone: UTC+3 (TRT)

Çevrimpınar (Kurdish: Goruz) is a village in the Bingöl District, Bingöl Province, Turkey. The village is populated by Kurds of the Bekiran tribe and had a population of 401 in 2021.

The hamlet of Alataş is attached to the village.
