= Yenisu, Genç =

Village in Bingöl Province, Turkey

Yenisu
- Village
- Location within Turkey
- Coordinates: 38.753°N 40.880°E
- Country: Turkey
- Province: Bingöl
- District: Genç
- Population (2021): 186
- Time zone: UTC+3 (TRT)

Yenisu (Kurdish: Nederan, Armenian: Jabugnoud, Janut, Chapugnoud, Nederan, Chabgnud) is a village in the Genç District, Bingöl Province, Turkey. The village is populated by Kurds of the Tavz tribe and had a population of 186 in 2021.

The hamlets of Çevreli and Demirkapı are attached to the village.

Before the Armenian genocide, Chabgnud had 250 Armenians, 24 houses, one church.
