= Çayağzı, Bingöl =

Village in Bingöl Province, Turkey

Çayağzı
- Village
- Location within Turkey
- Coordinates: 38.793°N 40.544°E
- Country: Turkey
- Province: Bingöl
- District: Bingöl
- Population (2021): 187
- Time zone: UTC+3 (TRT)

Çayağzı (Kurdish: Fekçunit) is a village in the Bingöl District, Bingöl Province, Turkey. The village had a population of 187 in 2021.

The hamlet of Aşağı Ardıçtepe is attached to the village.
