= Ortaköy, Bingöl =

Village in Bingöl Province, Turkey

Ortaköy
- Village
- Location within Turkey
- Coordinates: 38.858°N 40.365°E
- Country: Turkey
- Province: Bingöl
- District: Bingöl
- Population (2021): 55
- Time zone: UTC+3 (TRT)

Ortaköy (Kurdish: Dewamîyanîn) is a village in the Bingöl District, Bingöl Province, Turkey.

== Demographics ==
The village is populated by Kurds of the Pox tribe and had a population of 55 in 2021.
