= Tarlabaşı, Genç =

Village in Bingöl Province, Turkey

Tarlabaşı
- Village
- Location within Turkey
- Coordinates: 38.727°N 40.489°E
- Country: Turkey
- Province: Bingöl
- District: Genç
- Population (2021): 235
- Time zone: UTC+3 (TRT)

Tarlabaşı (Kurdish: Rotcan) is a village in the Genç District, Bingöl Province, Turkey. The village is populated by Kurds and had a population of 235 in 2021.

The hamlets of Bardaklı, Budak, Çağlarca, Topluca and Yağmurlu are attached to the village.
