= Garip, Bingöl =

Village in Bingöl Province, Turkey

Garip
- Village
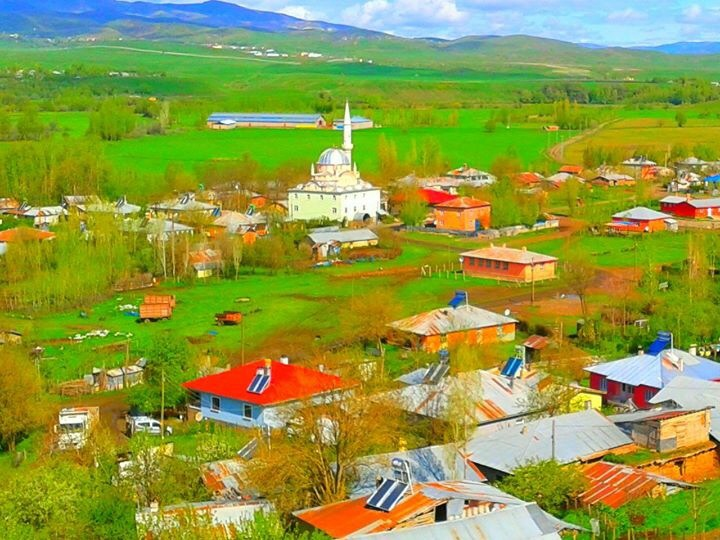

- Location within Turkey
- Coordinates: 38.783°N 40.562°E
- Country: Turkey
- Province: Bingöl
- District: Bingöl
- Population (2021): 528
- Time zone: UTC+3 (TRT)

Garip (Kurdish: Xerîb) is a village in the Bingöl District, Bingöl Province, Turkey. The village had a population of 528 in 2021.
