= Servi, Genç =

Village in Bingöl Province, Turkey

Servi
- Village
- Location in Turkey
- Coordinates: 38.573°N 40.314°E
- Country: Turkey
- Province: Bingöl
- District: Genç
- Population (2021): 1,621
- Time zone: UTC+3 (TRT)

Servi (Kurdish: Serbê, Sîwan) is a village in the Genç District, Bingöl Province, Turkey. The village is populated by Kurds and had a population of 1,621 in 2021.
