= Eskibağ, Genç =

Village in Bingöl Province, Turkey

Eskibağ
- Village
- Location within Turkey
- Coordinates: 38.583°N 40.229°E
- Country: Turkey
- Province: Bingöl
- District: Genç
- Population (2021): 170
- Time zone: UTC+3 (TRT)

Eskibağ (Kurdish: Xwênan) is a village in the Genç District, Bingöl Province, Turkey. The village had a population of 170 in 2021.

The hamlet of Çöğürlü is attached to the village.
