= Sudüğünü, Bingöl =

Village in Bingöl Province, Turkey

Sudüğünü
- Village
- Location within Turkey
- Coordinates: 39.047°N 40.433°E
- Country: Turkey
- Province: Bingöl
- District: Bingöl
- Population (2021): 1,226
- Time zone: UTC+3 (TRT)

Sudüğünü (Kurdish: Şirnan, Şîrnûn) is a village in the Bingöl District, Bingöl Province, Turkey. The village is populated by Kurds and had a population of 1,226 in 2021.

The hamlets of Aktoprak, Çakır, Elmaçayırı, Esinli, Haroçayırı, Hılır and Konuksever are attached to the village.
