= Bilaloğlu, Bingöl =

Village in Bingöl Province, Turkey

Bilaloğlu
- Village
- Location within Turkey
- Coordinates: 38.921°N 40.393°E
- Country: Turkey
- Province: Bingöl
- District: Bingöl
- Population (2021): 199
- Time zone: UTC+3 (TRT)

Bilaloğlu (Kurdish: Mendo) is a village in the Bingöl District, Bingöl Province, Turkey. The village is populated by Kurds of the Xeylan tribe and had a population of 199 in 2021.
