= Gökçekanat, Bingöl =

Village in Bingöl Province, Turkey

Gökçekanat
- Village
- Location within Turkey
- Coordinates: 38.954°N 40.341°E
- Country: Turkey
- Province: Bingöl
- District: Bingöl
- Population (2021): 338
- Time zone: UTC+3 (TRT)

Gökçekanat (Kurdish: Qarawelan) is a village in the Bingöl District, Bingöl Province, Turkey. The village is populated by Kurds of the Bekiran tribe and had a population of 338 in 2021.

The hamlet of Bulutlu is attached to the village.
