= Çukurca, Bingöl =

Village in Bingöl Province, Turkey

Çukurca
- Village
- Location within Turkey
- Coordinates: 38.950°N 40.507°E
- Country: Turkey
- Province: Bingöl
- District: Bingöl
- Population (2021): 418
- Time zone: UTC+3 (TRT)

Çukurca (Kurdish: Kortdew) is a village in the Bingöl District, Bingöl Province, Turkey. The village is populated by Kurds of the Nakşan tribe and had a population of 418 in 2021.

The hamlets of Bostanbaşı and Laleli are attached to the village.
