= Gözütok, Genç =

Village in Bingöl Province, Turkey

Gözütok
- Village
- Location within Turkey
- Coordinates: 38.776°N 40.697°E
- Country: Turkey
- Province: Bingöl
- District: Genç
- Population (2021): 150
- Time zone: UTC+3 (TRT)

Gözütok (Kurdish: Xut) is a village in the Genç District, Bingöl Province, Turkey. The village is populated by Kurds of the Ziktî tribe and had a population of 150 in 2021.

The hamlets of Benekli and Küpeli are attached to the village.
