= Suvaran, Bingöl =

Village in Bingöl Province, Turkey

Suvaran
- Village
- Location within Turkey
- Coordinates: 38.740°N 40.382°E
- Country: Turkey
- Province: Bingöl
- District: Bingöl
- Population (2021): 199
- Time zone: UTC+3 (TRT)

Suvaran (Kurdish: Suwaran) is a village in the Bingöl District, Bingöl Province, Turkey. The village had a population of 199 in 2021.
