= Erentepe, Bingöl =

Village in Bingöl Province, Turkey

Erentepe
- Village
- Location within Turkey
- Coordinates: 38°48′25″N 40°27′57″E
- Country: Turkey
- Province: Bingöl
- District: Bingöl
- Population (2021): 76
- Time zone: UTC+3 (TRT)

Erentepe (Kurdish: Şîneg) is a village in the Bingöl District, Bingöl Province, Turkey. The village is populated by Kurds of the Musyan tribe and had a population of 65 in 2021.
