= Gökçeli, Bingöl =

Village in Bingöl Province, Turkey

Gökçeli
- Village
- Location within Turkey
- Coordinates: 38.884°N 40.754°E
- Country: Turkey
- Province: Bingöl
- District: Bingöl
- Population (2021): 498
- Time zone: UTC+3 (TRT)

Gökçeli (Kurdish: Talware) is a village in the Bingöl District, Bingöl Province, Turkey. The village is populated by Kurds of the Çolemêrgî tribe and had a population of 498 in 2021.
