= Gerçekli, Genç =

Village in Bingöl Province, Turkey

Gerçekli
- Village
- Location within Turkey
- Coordinates: 38.658°N 40.263°E
- Country: Turkey
- Province: Bingöl
- District: Genç
- Population (2021): 131
- Time zone: UTC+3 (TRT)

Gerçekli (Kurdish: Xeylanê Kebir) is a village in the Genç District, Bingöl Province, Turkey. The village is populated by Kurds and had a population of 131 in 2021.

The hamlets of Bayramlı, Iğdecik and Kapılı are attached to the village.
