= Gönülaçan, Genç =

Village in Bingöl Province, Turkey

Gönülaçan
- Village
- Location within Turkey
- Coordinates: 38.620°N 40.276°E
- Country: Turkey
- Province: Bingöl
- District: Genç
- Population (2021): 130
- Time zone: UTC+3 (TRT)

Gönülaçan (Kurdish: Heydan) is a village in the Genç District, Bingöl Province, Turkey. The village is populated by Kurds and had a population of 130 in 2021.

The hamlets of Kapaklı is attached to the village.
