= Sürekli, Genç =

Village in Bingöl Province, Turkey

Sürekli
- Village
- Location within Turkey
- Coordinates: 38.760°N 40.603°E
- Country: Turkey
- Province: Bingöl
- District: Genç
- Population (2021): 125
- Time zone: UTC+3 (TRT)

Sürekli (Kurdish: Dîyarê Bogî) is a village in the Genç District, Bingöl Province, Turkey. The village is populated by Kurds and had a population of 125 in 2021.
