= Yeşilköy, Bingöl =

Village in Bingöl Province, Turkey

Yeşilköy
- Village
- Location within Turkey
- Coordinates: 38.834°N 40.491°E
- Country: Turkey
- Province: Bingöl
- District: Bingöl
- Population (2021): 300
- Time zone: UTC+3 (TRT)

Yeşilköy (Kurdish: Azun) is a village in the Bingöl District, Bingöl Province, Turkey. The village had a population of 300 in 2021.
