= Çamlıyurt, Genç =

Village in Bingöl Province, Turkey

Çamlıyurt
- Village
- Location within Turkey
- Coordinates: 38.703°N 40.396°E
- Country: Turkey
- Province: Bingöl
- District: Genç
- Population (2021): 55
- Time zone: UTC+3 (TRT)

Çamlıyurt (Kurdish: Xwedan) is a village in the Genç District, Bingöl Province, Turkey. The village had a population of 55 in 2021.
