= Ortaçanak, Bingöl =

Village in Bingöl Province, Turkey

Ortaçanak
- Village
- Location within Turkey
- Coordinates: 39.019°N 40.574°E
- Country: Turkey
- Province: Bingöl
- District: Bingöl
- Population (2021): 72
- Time zone: UTC+3 (TRT)

Ortaçanak (Kurdish: Xidan) is a village in the Bingöl District, Bingöl Province, Turkey. The village is populated by Kurds of the Hormek tribe and had a population of 72 in 2021.
