= Ayanoğlu, Yedisu =

Village in Bingöl Province, Turkey

Ayanoğlu
- Village
- Location within Turkey
- Coordinates: 39.475°N 40.421°E
- Country: Turkey
- Province: Bingöl
- District: Yedisu
- Population (2021): 64
- Time zone: UTC+3 (TRT)

Ayanoğlu (Kurdish: Amariç) is a village in the Yedisu District, Bingöl Province, Turkey. The village is populated by Kurds of the Çarekan tribe and had a population of 64 in 2021.

The hamlets of Konacık and Yoncalık are attached to the village.
