= Göltepesi, Bingöl =

Village in Bingöl Province, Turkey

Göltepesi
- Village
- Location within Turkey
- Coordinates: 38.960°N 40.592°E
- Country: Turkey
- Province: Bingöl
- District: Bingöl
- Population (2021): 1,052
- Time zone: UTC+3 (TRT)

Göltepesi (Kurdish: Çon) is a village in the Bingöl District, Bingöl Province, Turkey. The village is populated by Kurds and had a population of 1,052 in 2021.

== History ==
Near the village lies a lake locally known as "Gvalé arminu" (Armenian lake). It is a site where more than a thousand Armenians were massacred during the Armenian genocide in 1915. Villagers and researcher Orhan Zuexpayıc say the lake still reveals traces of the killings when its waters recede, including human bones and belongings of the victims.
