= Çobantaşı, Bingöl =

Village in Bingöl Province, Turkey

Çobantaşı
- Village
- Location within Turkey
- Coordinates: 39.066°N 40.809°E
- Country: Turkey
- Province: Bingöl
- District: Bingöl
- Population (2021): 942
- Time zone: UTC+3 (TRT)

Çobantaşı (Kurdish: Sexiye) is a village in the Bingöl District, Bingöl Province, Turkey. The village is populated by Kurds and had a population of 942 in 2021.
