= Köklü, Bingöl =

Village in Bingöl Province, Turkey

Köklü
- Village
- Location within Turkey
- Coordinates: 38.951°N 40.630°E
- Country: Turkey
- Province: Bingöl
- District: Bingöl
- Population (2021): 158
- Time zone: UTC+3 (TRT)

Köklü (Kurdish: Tuyêrek) is a village in the Bingöl District, Bingöl Province, Turkey. The village had a population of 158 in 2021.
