= Sarmakaya, Genç =

Village in Bingöl Province, Turkey

Sarmakaya
- Village
- Location within Turkey
- Coordinates: 38.726°N 40.945°E
- Country: Turkey
- Province: Bingöl
- District: Genç
- Population (2021): 100
- Time zone: UTC+3 (TRT)

Sarmakaya (Kurdish: Gulayan) is a village in the Genç District, Bingöl Province, Turkey. The village is populated by Kurds of the Tavz tribe and had a population of 100 in 2021.

The hamlets of Akarsu, Bardacık, Boylu, Oğlaklı, Oluklu and Oruçlu are attached to the village.
