= Tepebaşı, Bingöl =

Village in Bingöl Province, Turkey

Tepebaşı
- Village
- Location within Turkey
- Coordinates: 39.080°N 40.452°E
- Country: Turkey
- Province: Bingöl
- District: Bingöl
- Population (2021): 56
- Time zone: UTC+3 (TRT)

Tepebaşı (Kurdish: Mezrê Biro) is a village in the Bingöl District, Bingöl Province, Turkey. The village is populated by Kurds and had a population of 56 in 2021.
