= Çavuşlar, Bingöl =

Village in Bingöl Province, Turkey

Çavuşlar
- Village
- Location within Turkey
- Coordinates: 38.938°N 40.760°E
- Country: Turkey
- Province: Bingöl
- District: Bingöl
- Population (2021): 2,270
- Time zone: UTC+3 (TRT)

Çavuşlar (Kurdish: Perxûngoka corîn) is a village in the Bingöl District, Bingöl Province, Turkey. The village had a population of 2,270 in 2021.
