= Arıcılar, Bingöl =

Village in Bingöl Province, Turkey

Arıcılar
- Village
- Location within Turkey
- Coordinates: 39.058°N 40.308°E
- Country: Turkey
- Province: Bingöl
- District: Bingöl
- Population (2021): 210
- Time zone: UTC+3 (TRT)

Arıcılar (Kurdish: Sox) is a village in the Bingöl District, Bingöl Province, Turkey. The village is populated by Kurds and had a population of 210 in 2021.

The hamlet of Kork is attached to the village.
