= Üçyaka, Bingöl =

Village in Bingöl Province, Turkey

Üçyaka
- Village
- Location within Turkey
- Coordinates: 38.853°N 40.443°E
- Country: Turkey
- Province: Bingöl
- District: Bingöl
- Population (2021): 74
- Time zone: UTC+3 (TRT)

Üçyaka (Kurdish: Az) is a village in the Bingöl District, Bingöl Province, Turkey. The village is populated by Kurds of the Az tribe and had a population of 74 in 2021.
