= Doğanlı, Genç =

Village in Bingöl Province, Turkey

Doğanlı
- Village
- Location within Turkey
- Coordinates: 38.709°N 40.280°E
- Country: Turkey
- Province: Bingöl
- District: Genç
- Population (2021): 37
- Time zone: UTC+3 (TRT)

Doğanlı (Kurdish: Kelaxsî) is a village in the Genç District, Bingöl Province, Turkey. The village is populated by Kurds and had a population of 37 in 2021.

The hamlets of Çubuk and Kabataş are attached to the village.
