= Direkli, Bingöl =

Village in Bingöl Province, Turkey

Direkli
- Village
- Location within Turkey
- Coordinates: 38.935°N 40.329°E
- Country: Turkey
- Province: Bingöl
- District: Bingöl
- Population (2021): 125
- Time zone: UTC+3 (TRT)

Direkli (Kurdish: Kalweliyan) is a village in the Bingöl District, Bingöl Province, Turkey. The village is populated by Kurds of the Bekiran tribe and had a population of 125 in 2021.
