= Yukarıakpınar, Bingöl =

Village in Bingöl Province, Turkey

Yukarıakpınar
- Village
- Location within Turkey
- Coordinates: 38.861°N 40.471°E
- Country: Turkey
- Province: Bingöl
- District: Bingöl
- Population (2021): 81
- Time zone: UTC+3 (TRT)

Yukarıakpınar (Kurdish: Sepenê) is a village in the Bingöl District, Bingöl Province, Turkey. The village is populated by Kurds of the Az tribe and had a population of 81 in 2021.

The hamlet of Mirzan is attached to the village.
