= Çaytepe, Genç =

Village in Bingöl Province, Turkey

Çaytepe
- Village
- Location within Turkey
- Coordinates: 38.801°N 40.681°E
- Country: Turkey
- Province: Bingöl
- District: Genç
- Population (2021): 609
- Time zone: UTC+3 (TRT)

Çaytepe (Kurdish: Valêre) is a village in the Genç District, Bingöl Province, Turkey. The village is populated by Kurds of the Ziktî tribe and had a population of 609 in 2021.

The hamlets of Derezel, Dikistasyonu, Düşmalan and Kırnik are attached to the village.
