= Olukpınar, Bingöl =

Village in Bingöl Province, Turkey

Olukpınar
- Village
- Location within Turkey
- Coordinates: 38.787°N 40.455°E
- Country: Turkey
- Province: Bingöl
- District: Bingöl
- Population (2021): 60
- Time zone: UTC+3 (TRT)

Olukpınar, also known as Oluklar (Kurdish: Çoleg) is a village in the Bingöl District, Bingöl Province, Turkey. The village is populated by Kurds of the Musyan tribe and had a population of 60 in 2021.
