= Mollaibrahim, Genç =

Village in Bingöl Province, Turkey

Mollaibrahim
- Village
- Location within Turkey
- Coordinates: 38.628°N 40.235°E
- Country: Turkey
- Province: Bingöl
- District: Genç
- Population (2021): 36
- Time zone: UTC+3 (TRT)

Mollaibrahim (Kurdish: Birahîman) is a village in the Genç District, Bingöl Province, Turkey. The village is populated by Kurds and had a population of 36 in 2021.

The hamlet of Tokmacık is attached to the village.
