= Bulgurluk, Genç =

Village in Bingöl Province, Turkey

Bulgurluk
- Village
- Location within Turkey
- Coordinates: 38.642°N 40.599°E
- Country: Turkey
- Province: Bingöl
- District: Genç
- Population (2021): 100
- Time zone: UTC+3 (TRT)

Bulgurluk (Kurdish: Mistan) is a village in the Genç District, Bingöl Province, Turkey. The village is populated by Kurds of the Botikan tribe and had a population of 100 in 2021.

The hamlets of Bağbaşı, Demiroğlu, Kilimli, Kirişli, Konacık, Okçular, Savaş, Taşkapı, Yazmalı and Yıldızlı are attached to the village.
