= Gürpınar, Bingöl =

Village in Bingöl Province, Turkey

Gürpınar
- Village
- Location within Turkey
- Coordinates: 38.781°N 40.449°E
- Country: Turkey
- Province: Bingöl
- District: Bingöl
- Population (2021): 62
- Time zone: UTC+3 (TRT)

Gürpınar (Kurdish: Lotan) is a village in the Bingöl District, Bingöl Province, Turkey. The village is populated by Kurds of the Musyan tribe and had a population of 62 in 2021.

The hamlet of Zeynep is attached to the village.
