= Güzeldere, Genç =

Village in Bingöl Province, Turkey

Güzeldere
- Village
- Location within Turkey
- Coordinates: 38.677°N 40.414°E
- Country: Turkey
- Province: Bingöl
- District: Genç
- Population (2021): 127
- Time zone: UTC+3 (TRT)

Güzeldere (Kurdish: Gaze) is a village in the Genç District, Bingöl Province, Turkey. The village is populated by Kurds and had a population of 127 in 2021.

The hamlets of Araplı, Çakmaklı, Eyerli, Gürlek, İnandık and Yeniler are attached to the village.
