= Kuşkondu, Bingöl =

Village in Bingöl Province, Turkey

Kuşkondu
- Village
- Location within Turkey
- Coordinates: 39.067°N 40.326°E
- Country: Turkey
- Province: Bingöl
- District: Bingöl
- Population (2021): 154
- Time zone: UTC+3 (TRT)

Kuşkondu (Kurdish: Geylanê Xelîl) is a village in the Bingöl District, Bingöl Province, Turkey. The village is populated by Kurds and had a population of 154 in 2021.
