= Yiğitbaşı, Genç =

Village in Bingöl Province, Turkey

Yiğitbaşı
- Village
- Location within Turkey
- Coordinates: 38.748°N 40.754°E
- Country: Turkey
- Province: Bingöl
- District: Genç
- Population (2021): 226
- Time zone: UTC+3 (TRT)

Yiğitbaşı (Kurdish: Vazenan) is a village in the Genç District, Bingöl Province, Turkey. The village is populated by Kurds of the Ziktî tribe and had a population of 226 in 2021.

The hamlets of Aydın, Ayrancı and Işıklı are attached to the village.
