= Çiçekyayla, Bingöl =

Village in Bingöl Province, Turkey

Çicekyayla
- Village
- Location within Turkey
- Coordinates: 38.820°N 40.466°E
- Country: Turkey
- Province: Bingöl
- District: Bingöl
- Population (2021): 112
- Time zone: UTC+3 (TRT)

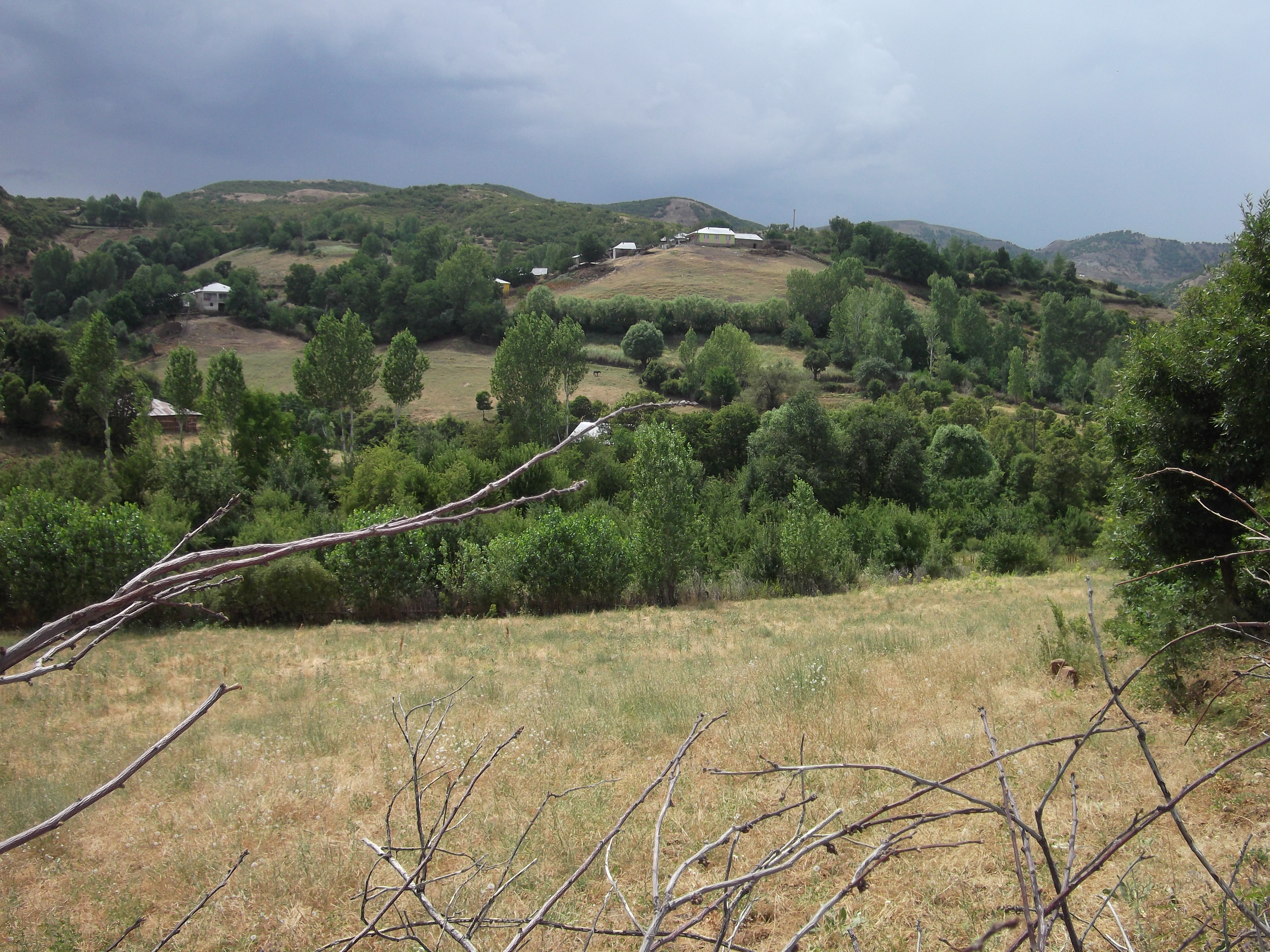
Çiçekyayla village

Çicekyayla (Kurdish: Vilwarê) is a village in the Bingöl District, Bingöl Province, Turkey. The village is populated by Kurds and had a population of 112 in 2021.
