= Kabayel, Yedisu =

Village in Bingöl Province, Turkey

Kabayel
- Village
- Location within Turkey
- Coordinates: 39.477°N 40.310°E
- Country: Turkey
- Province: Bingöl
- District: Yedisu
- Population (2021): 126
- Time zone: UTC+3 (TRT)

Kabayel (Kurdish: Feme) is a village in the Yedisu District, Bingöl Province, Turkey. The village is populated by Kurds of the Çarekan tribe and had a population of 126 in 2021.

The hamlets of Aksu, Aşağıtepebaşı, Danalı, Düzçayır, Giyimli, Göl, Hatuntarla, Horoz, Işıklı, İnceler, Karamusalar, Katırcı, Kırmızı, Kuytuca, Küçükçiftlik, Ortanca and Şampaşa are attached to the village.
