= Bahçeli, Bingöl =

Village in Bingöl Province, Turkey

Bahçeli
- Village
- Location within Turkey
- Coordinates: 38.743°N 40.390°E
- Country: Turkey
- Province: Bingöl
- District: Bingöl
- Population (2021): 154
- Time zone: UTC+3 (TRT)

Bahçeli (Kurdish: Mirî) is a village in the Bingöl District, Bingöl Province, Turkey. The village is populated by Kurds and had a population of 154 in 2021.
