= Yelkaya, Genç =

Village in Bingöl Province, Turkey

Yelkaya
- Village
- Location within Turkey
- Coordinates: 38.594°N 40.424°E
- Country: Turkey
- Province: Bingöl
- District: Genç
- Population (2021): 57
- Time zone: UTC+3 (TRT)

Yelkaya (Kurdish: Gulikan) is a village in the Genç District, Bingöl Province, Turkey. The village is populated by Kurds and had a population of 57 in 2021.

The hamlets of Kocakaya, Koyunoba, Köplüce and Körüktaşı are attached to the village.
