= Doğanca, Genç =

Village in Bingöl Province, Turkey

Doğanca
- Village
- Location within Turkey
- Coordinates: 38.703°N 40.552°E
- Country: Turkey
- Province: Bingöl
- District: Genç
- Population (2021): 301
- Time zone: UTC+3 (TRT)

Doğanca (Kurdish: Çimeyê Hênî) is a village in the Genç District, Bingöl Province, Turkey. The village is populated by Kurds and had a population of 301 in 2021.

The hamlets of Akyumak, Arpaçay, Bağış, Bürnek, Çiçekli, Develi, Dibek, Düzyayla, Eskiköy and Tepecik are attached to the village.
