= Keklikdere, Genç =

Village in Bingöl Province, Turkey

Keklikdere
- Village
- Location within Turkey
- Coordinates: 38°43′54″N 40°39′11″E
- Country: Turkey
- Province: Bingöl
- District: Genç
- Population (2021): 169
- Time zone: UTC+3 (TRT)

Keklikdere (Kurdish: Parçanc) is a village in the Genç District, Bingöl Province, Turkey. The village is populated by Kurds and had a population of 169 in 2021.

The hamlets of Ağılcık, Dumluca, Eskikeklikdere, Hayran, İpekli, Koyuncu, Onbaşı, Yamanlar and Yeşiller are attached to the village.
