= Küçüktekören, Bingöl =

Village in Bingöl Province, Turkey

Küçüktekören
- Village
- Location within Turkey
- Coordinates: 38.858°N 40.499°E
- Country: Turkey
- Province: Bingöl
- District: Bingöl
- Population (2021): 210
- Time zone: UTC+3 (TRT)

Küçüktekören (Kurdish: Zeyneb) is a village in the Bingöl District, Bingöl Province, Turkey. The village is populated by Kurds of the Az tribe and had a population of 210 in 2021.

The hamlet of Zeynep is attached to the village.
