= Doğanevler, Genç =

Village in Bingöl Province, Turkey

Doğanevler
- Village
- Location within Turkey
- Coordinates: 38.769°N 40.855°E
- Country: Turkey
- Province: Bingöl
- District: Genç
- Population (2021): 194
- Time zone: UTC+3 (TRT)

Doğanevler (Kurdish: Şernan) is a village in the Genç District, Bingöl Province, Turkey. The village is populated by Kurds and had a population of 194 in 2021.

The hamlets of Doğanlar and Karataş are attached to the village.
