= Karapolat, Yedisu =

Village in Bingöl Province, Turkey

Karapolat
- Village
- Location within Turkey
- Coordinates: 39.454°N 40.478°E
- Country: Turkey
- Province: Bingöl
- District: Yedisu
- Population (2021): 32
- Time zone: UTC+3 (TRT)

Karapolat is a village in the Yedisu District, Bingöl Province, Turkey. The village is populated by Circassians and had a population of 32 in 2021.

The hamlet of Yukarı Karabolat is attached to the village.
