= Kıran, Bingöl =

Village in Bingöl Province, Turkey

Kıran
- Village
- Location within Turkey
- Coordinates: 38.742°N 40.418°E
- Country: Turkey
- Province: Bingöl
- District: Bingöl
- Population (2021): 247
- Time zone: UTC+3 (TRT)

Kıran (Kurdish: Kiran) is a village in the Bingöl District, Bingöl Province, Turkey. The village had a population of 247 in 2021.

The hamlet of Ocak is attached to the village.
