= Direkli, Genç =

Village in Bingöl Province, Turkey

Direkli
- Village
- Location within Turkey
- Coordinates: 38.594°N 40.376°E
- Country: Turkey
- Province: Bingöl
- District: Genç
- Population (2021): 288
- Time zone: UTC+3 (TRT)

Direkli (Kurdish: Wişkçir) is a village in the Genç District, Bingöl Province, Turkey. The village is populated by Kurds and had a population of 288 in 2021.

The hamlets of Taşören, Tavşanderesi and Usluca are attached to the village.
