= Pınaraltı, Genç =

Village in Bingöl Province, Turkey

Pınaraltı
- Village
- Location within Turkey
- Coordinates: 38.750°N 40.901°E
- Country: Turkey
- Province: Bingöl
- District: Genç
- Population (2021): 63
- Time zone: UTC+3 (TRT)

Pınaraltı (Kurdish: Şegan) is a village in the Genç District, Bingöl Province, Turkey. The village is populated by Kurds of the Tavz tribe and had a population of 63 in 2021.

The hamlets of Sarıkaya and Tulumlu are attached to the village.
