= Akdurmuş, Bingöl =

Village in Bingöl Province, Turkey

Akdurmuş
- Village
- Location within Turkey
- Coordinates: 38.841°N 40.472°E
- Country: Turkey
- Province: Bingöl
- District: Bingöl
- Elevation: 1,325 m (4,347 ft)
- Population (2021): 175
- Time zone: UTC+3 (TRT)

Akdurmuş (Kurdish: Guldar) is a village in the Bingöl District, Bingöl Province, Turkey. The village is populated by Kurds of the Az tribe and had a population of 175 in 2021. It is located at an altitude of 1,325 m (4,347 ft).

The hamlet of Dikmence is attached to the village.
