= Yenibaşlar, Bingöl =

Village in Bingöl Province, Turkey

Yenibaşlar
- Village
- Location within Turkey
- Coordinates: 39.000°N 40.690°E
- Country: Turkey
- Province: Bingöl
- District: Bingöl
- Population (2021): 1,384
- Time zone: UTC+3 (TRT)

Yenibaşlar (Kurdish: Elekrag) is a village in the Bingöl District, Bingöl Province, Turkey. The village is populated by Kurds and had a population of 1,384 in 2021.
