= Yaygınçayır, Bingöl =

Village in Bingöl Province, Turkey

Yaygınçayır
- Village
- Location within Turkey
- Coordinates: 39.030°N 40.296°E
- Country: Turkey
- Province: Bingöl
- District: Bingöl
- Population (2021): 199
- Time zone: UTC+3 (TRT)

Yaygınçayır (Kurdish: Kûmax) is a village in the Bingöl District, Bingöl Province, Turkey. The village is populated by Kurds and had a population of 199 in 2021.

The hamlet of Pekmezli is attached to the village.
