= Ericek, Genç =

Village in Bingöl Province, Turkey

Ericek
- Village
- Location within Turkey
- Coordinates: 38.584°N 40.264°E
- Country: Turkey
- Province: Bingöl
- District: Genç
- Population (2021): 100
- Time zone: UTC+3 (TRT)

Ericek (Kurdish: Hemsûr) is a village in the Genç District, Bingöl Province, Turkey. The village is populated by Kurds and had a population of 100 in 2021.

The hamlets of Akıncı, Atlılar and Kemerkaya are attached to the village.
