= Kurudere, Bingöl =

Village in Bingöl Province, Turkey

Kurudere
- Village
- Location within Turkey
- Coordinates: 38.903°N 40.469°E
- Country: Turkey
- Province: Bingöl
- District: Bingöl
- Population (2021): 300
- Time zone: UTC+3 (TRT)

Kurudere (Kurdish: Deroziwa) is a village in the Bingöl District, Bingöl Province, Turkey. The village had a population of 300 in 2021.

The hamlets of Aydoğdu, Bölücek and Kamışlı are attached to the village.
