= Yedisu =

Municipality of Bingöl Province, Turkey

- Municipality
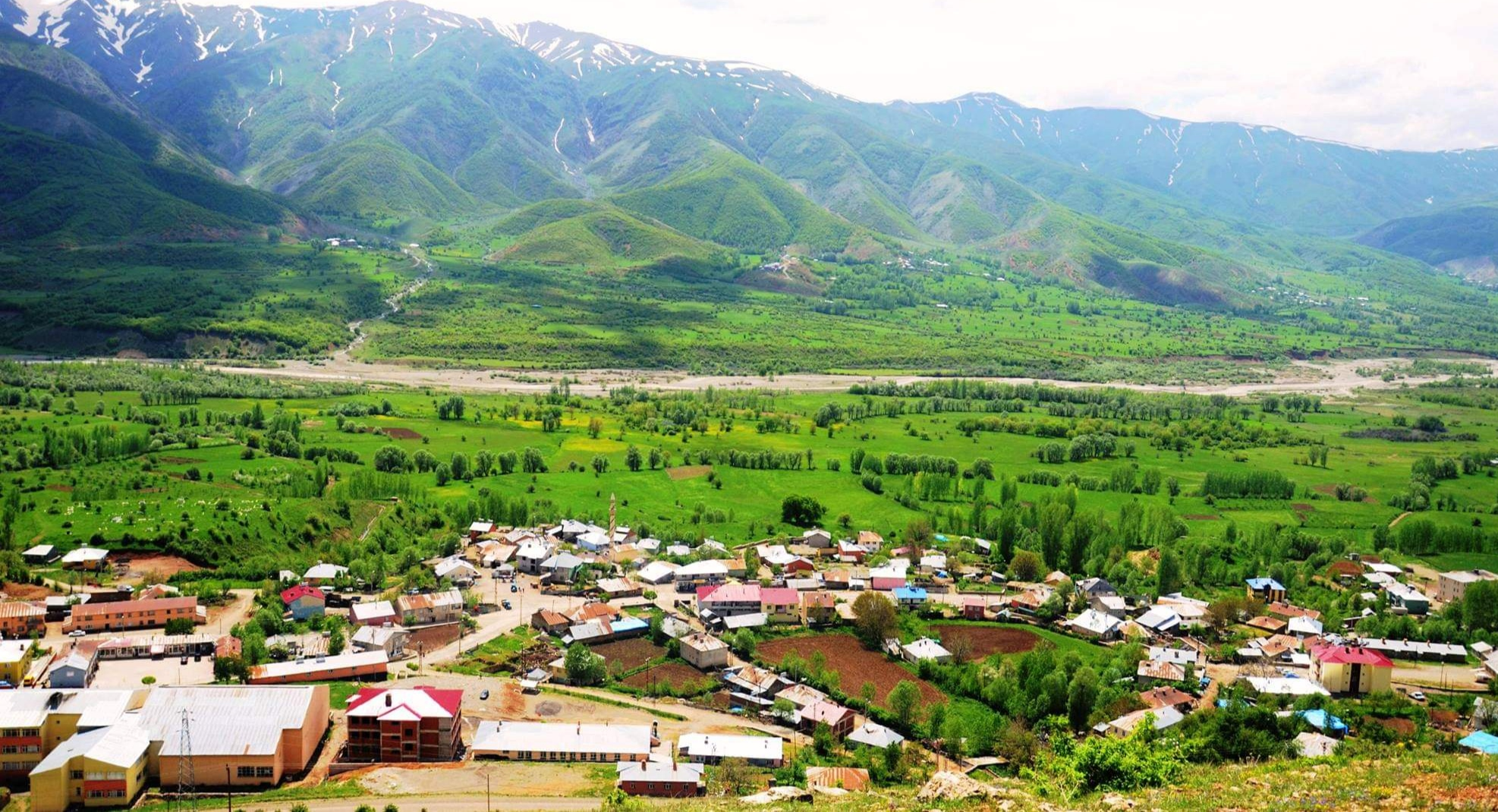

- Location within Turkey
- Coordinates: 39°26′02″N 40°32′43″E
- Country: Turkey
- Province: Bingöl
- District: Yedisu
- Population (2021): 1,468
- Time zone: UTC+3 (TRT)
- Website: www.yedisu.bel.tr

Yedisu (Kurdish: Çêrme, Armenian: Չերմե, romanized: Cherme) is a town (belde) and seat of the Yedisu District of Bingöl Province in Turkey. The town is populated by Kurds of the Çarekan and Şadiyan tribes and had a population of 1,468 in 2021.

The town is divided into the neighborhoods of Düşengi, Kabaoluk, Koşan, Merkez and Yeni Mahalle are attached to the village.

The mayor is Sedat Uçar (AKP).
