= Kuşburnu, Bingöl =

Village in Bingöl Province, Turkey

Kuşburnu
- Village
- Location within Turkey
- Coordinates: 38.868°N 40.793°E
- Country: Turkey
- Province: Bingöl
- District: Bingöl
- Population (2021): 111
- Time zone: UTC+3 (TRT)

Kuşburnu is a village in the Bingöl District, Bingöl Province, Turkey. The village had a population of 111 in 2021.
