= Kardeşler, Bingöl =

Village in Bingöl Province, Turkey

Kardeşler
- Village
- Location within Turkey
- Coordinates: 38.918°N 40.661°E
- Country: Turkey
- Province: Bingöl
- District: Bingöl
- Population (2021): 574
- Time zone: UTC+3 (TRT)

Kardeşler (Kurdish: Nebîyan) is a village in the Bingöl District, Bingöl Province, Turkey. The village had a population of 574 in 2021.
