= Sancak, Bingöl =

Town in Bingöl Province, Turkey

Sancak
- Municipality
- Location in Turkey
- Coordinates: 39°05′45″N 40°23′20″E
- Country: Turkey
- Province: Bingöl
- District: Bingöl
- Population (2021): 2,412
- Time zone: UTC+3 (TRT)

Sancak (Kurdish: Xoşkar) is a town (belde) in Bingöl District, Bingöl Province, Turkey. The town is populated by Kurds of the Bekiran, Reman and Şadiyan tribes and had a population of 2,412 in 2021.

The settlements of Akbudak (Mezrê Gîdîş), Büyükbaşköy (Başkoya mezin), Çimenli (Lek), Hoşkar, Karapınar, Küçükbaşköy (Başkoya piçuk), Sarıgümüş (Sîmsor) and Yeşilova (Xilbizûn) are attached to Sancak.
