= Arakonak, Solhan =

Arakonak
- Municipality
- Location in Turkey
- Coordinates: 38°58′23″N 41°7′48″E
- Country: Turkey
- Province: Bingöl
- District: Solhan
- Population (2021): 2,601
- Time zone: UTC+3 (TRT)

Arakonak (Kurdish: Girvas) is a town (belde) in Solhan District, Bingöl Province, Turkey. The town is populated by Kurds of the Xilan tribe and had a population of 2,601 in 2021.

The town is divided into the neighborhoods of Karşıyaka, Kültür and Merkez.
