= Sağgöze, Genç =

Village in Bingöl Province, Turkey

Sağgöze
- Village
- Location within Turkey
- Coordinates: 38.613°N 40.807°E
- Country: Turkey
- Province: Bingöl
- District: Genç
- Population (2021): 274
- Time zone: UTC+3 (TRT)

Sağgöze (Kurdish: Rîz) (Note: Also known as Riz, Sağgözek, Tavsalariz, or Tavsalayıriz.) is a village in the Genç District, Bingöl Province, Turkey. The village is populated by Kurds of the Ziktî tribe and had a population of 274 in 2021.

The hamlets of Bereket, Bozburun, Doyumlu, Durmuşlar, Kaymaz, Sevimli, Tanrıverdi, Taşlık and Yenice are attached to the village.

== History ==
Riz (today called Sağgöze) was historically inhabited by Armenians. There were 60 Armenian hearths in 1880. There were three Armenian churches in ruins. It was located in the Lice kaza in the Diyarbakır sanjak in the Diyarbekir vilayet in c. 1900.

== Bibliography ==
- Jongerden, Joost; Verheij, Jelle, eds. (2012). Social Relations in Ottoman Diyarbekir, 1870-1915. Brill.
- Kévorkian, Raymond H. (2006). "Demographic Changes in the Armenian Population of Diarbekir, 1895-1914". In Richard G. Hovannisian (ed.). Armenian Tigranakert/Diarbekir and Edessa/Urfa. Mazda Publishers. pp. 250–284.
