= Genç, Bingöl =

Municipality in Bingöl Province, Turkey

Genç
- Municipality
- Location in Turkey
- Coordinates: 38.750°N 40.556°E
- Country: Turkey
- Province: Bingöl
- District: Genç

Government
  - Mayor: Kemal Tartar (YRP)
- Elevation: 1,087 m (3,566 ft)
- Population (2021): 20,763
- Time zone: UTC+3 (TRT)
- Postal code: 12500
- Area code: 0426
- Website: www.genc.bel.tr

Genç (Kurdish: Darahênê, Zazaki: Dara Hênî, Armenian: Արդուշեն, romanized: Ardushen) is a town in Bingöl Province in Turkey. It is the seat of Genç District. Its population is 20,763 (2021). The mayor is Kemal Tartar (YRP).

The town is populated by Zaza Kurds.

== Neighborhoods ==
The town is divided into the neighborhoods of Cumhuriyet, Kültür, Yenişehir, Yeşildere and Yoldaşan.

== Demographics ==
On the eve of World War I, there were 4,344 Armenians in the sanjak of Genç. There was a small community of 240 Armenians in the city proper, with one church, St. Paul, and a school.

Mother tongue, Genç District, 1927 Turkish census
Turkish	Arabic	Kurdish	Circassian	Armenian	Unknown or other languages
558	1	3,100	–	–	–

Religion, Genç District, 1927 Turkish census
Muslim	Armenian	Orthodox	Other Christian
3,659	–	–	–

In 2011, the population of Genç district was 35,208, of which 19,123 live in the city itself.
