= Floating islands (Bingöl) =

Aquatic plants in Bingöl Province, Turkey

Floating islands of Bingöl Yüzen Adalar
- Natural monument
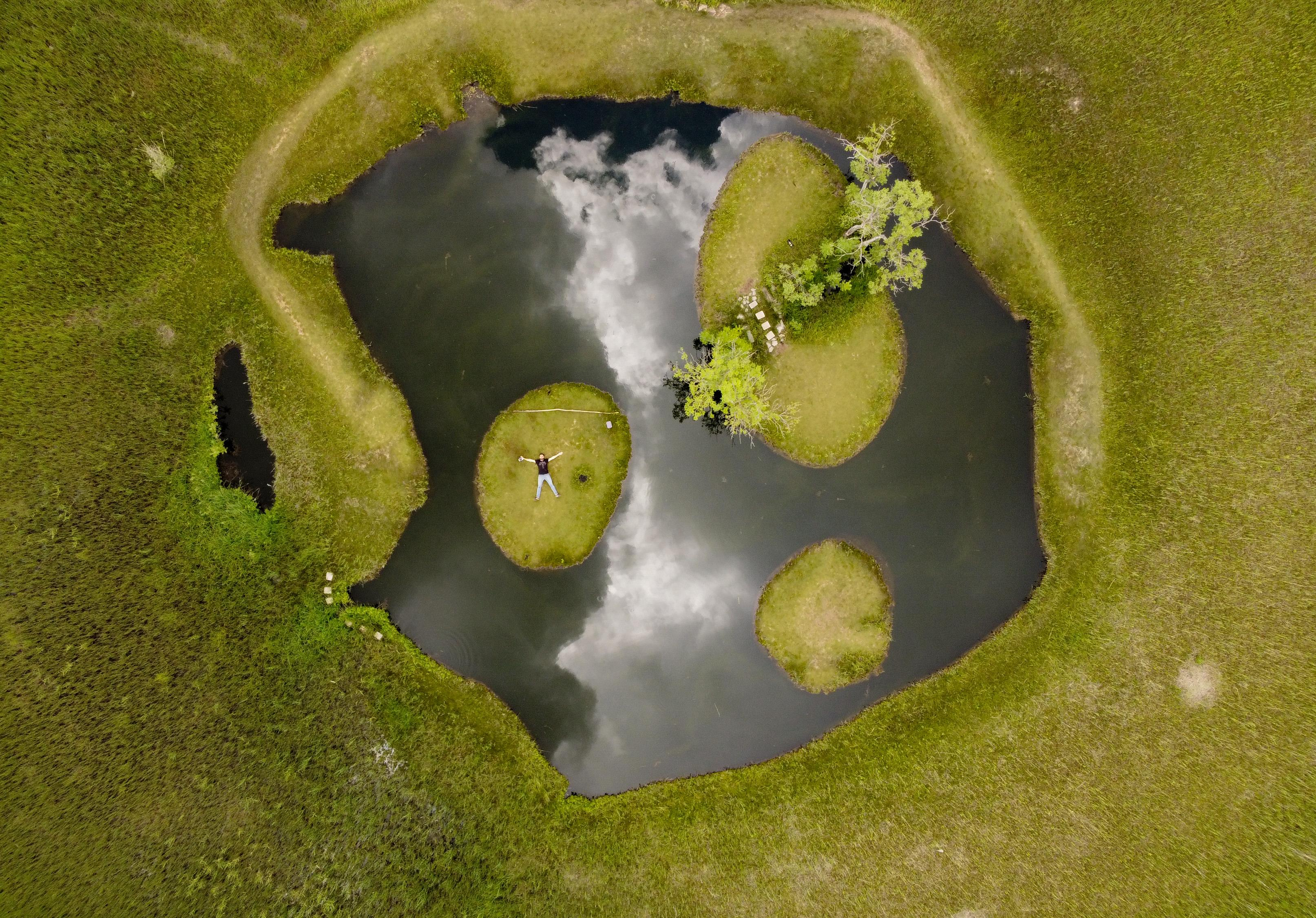
- Floating islands on the Lake Aksakal in Solhan, Bingöl Province, Turkey.

- Coordinates: 38°58′21″N 40°56′42″E
- Location: Hazarşah, Solhan, Bingöl Province, Turkey

Area
  - Total: 38.400 ha (94.89 acres)

Dimensions
  - Depth: 50 m

The floating islands of Bingöl (Turkish: Yüzen Adalar Tabiat Anıtı) are mass of floating aquatic plants in the form of islands on a lake in Bingöl Province, eastern Turkey. The formation is a registered natural monument of the country.

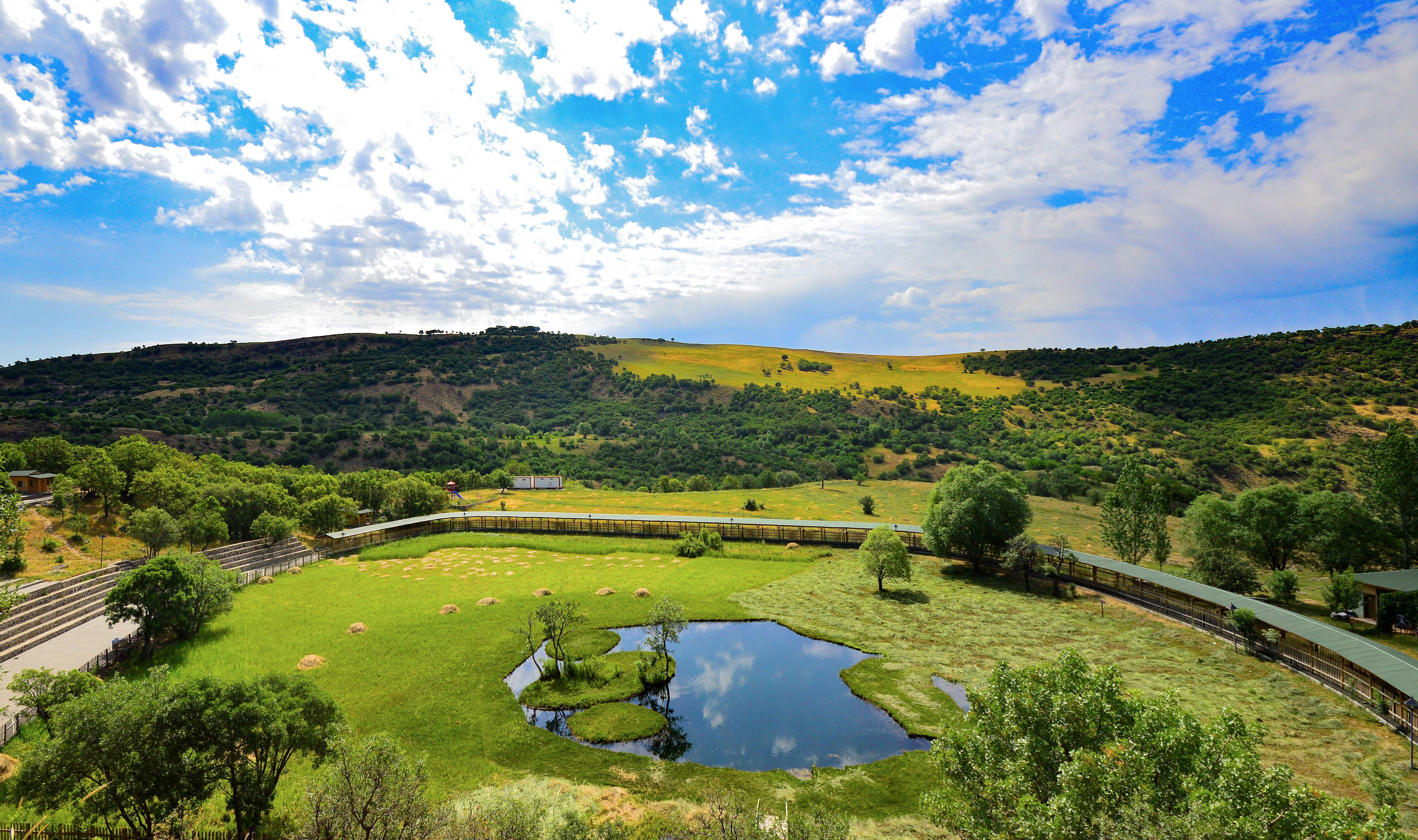
View of floating islands

Lake Aksakal, which contains the floating islands, is a crater lake located in Hazarşah village of Solhan district in Bingöl Province. It is 4.5 km (2.8 mi) far from the Bingöl-Muş highway D. 300. The lake is situated on a flat terrain surrounded on three sides by mountains and hills. The lake has freshwater. The water level of the lake remains same in the winter and summer months due to continuous inflow. There are three independently and freely moving floating islands on the lake. The floating island can be moved very slowly like a raft to any direction by standing on and stepping down on one side. There are 4-5 shrubs and ash trees on the floating islands. The soil on the floating islands is completely cohere with the prehensile roots of the vegetation. The vegetation consists of meadow grass, couch grass, and diverse aquatic plants. The area covers an area of 38.400 ha (94.89 acres).

The formation was registered a natural monument in 2003.
