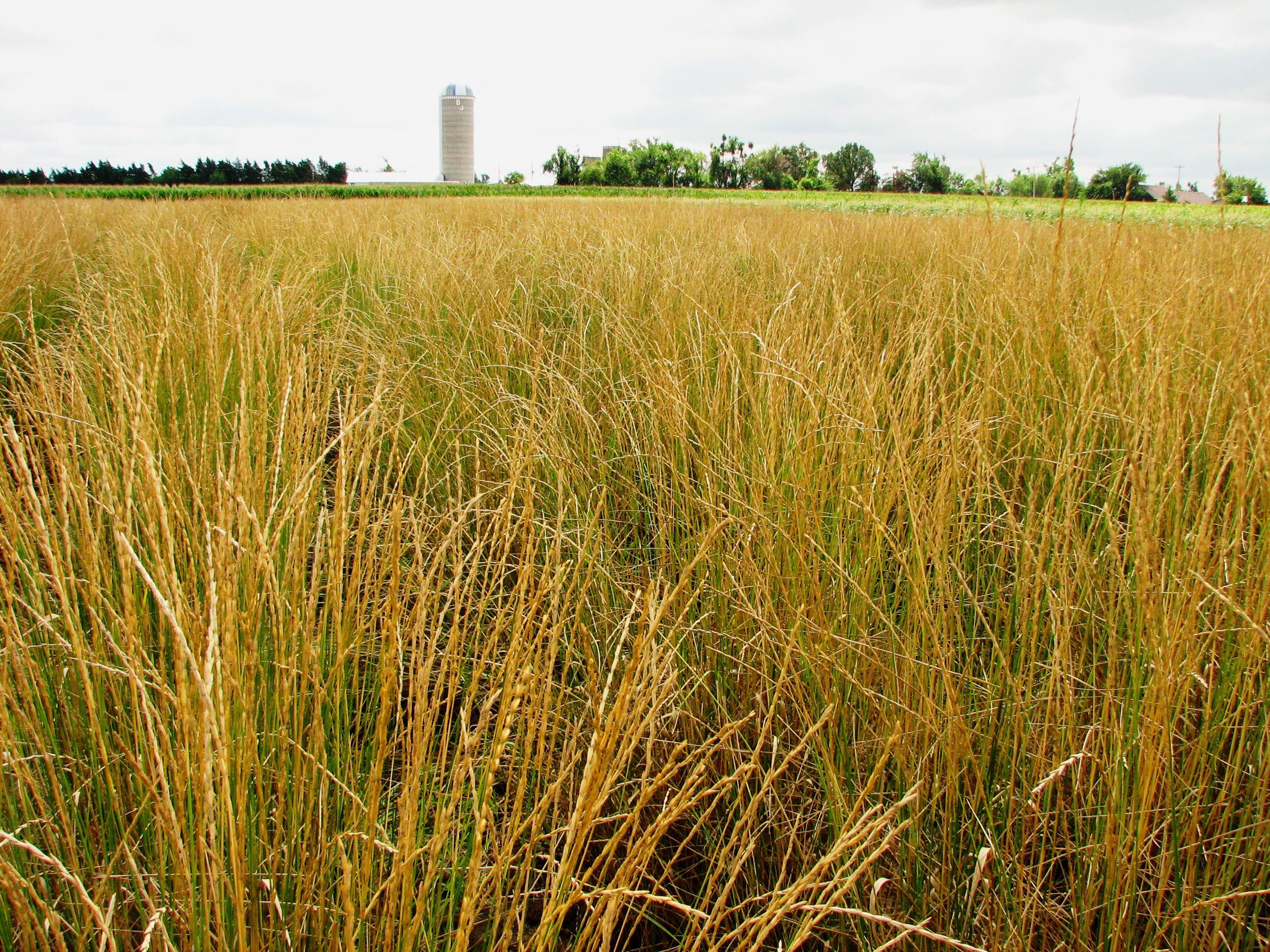

Scientific classification
- Kingdom: Plantae
- Clade: Tracheophytes
- Clade: Angiosperms
- Clade: Monocots
- Clade: Commelinids
- Order: Poales
- Family: Poaceae
- Subfamily: Pooideae
- Genus: Thinopyrum
- Species: T. intermedium

Binomial name
- Thinopyrum intermedium (Host) Barkworth & D.R. Dewey

= Thinopyrum intermedium =

Species of flowering plant

Thinopyrum intermedium, known commonly as intermediate wheatgrass, is a sod-forming perennial grass in the Triticeae tribe of Pooideae native to Europe and Western Asia. It is part of a group of plants commonly called wheatgrasses because of the similarity of their seed heads or ears to common wheat. However, wheatgrasses generally are perennial, while wheat is an annual.

Trials with intermediate wheatgrass, the product of which is trademarked by the Land Institute as "Kernza", show that it can be grown as a "multi-functional" crop, yielding various commodities as well as ecosystem services. Whereas annuals such as corn tend to deplete soil organic matter and require inputs, a perennial grain such as intermediate wheatgrass can yield crops while building soil organic matter.

== Synonyms ==
=== Scientific names ===
Many scientific binomial names have been given to the species Thinopyrum intermedium. Multiple species or subspecies have been described based on different morphologies, like if parts of the plants are pubescent (that is, covered with "hairs") or not. Here is a partial list of the binomial synonyms for Thinopyrum intermedium:

Agropyron aucheri
Agropyron ciliatiflorum
Agropyron gentryi
Agropyron glaucum
Agropyron intermedium
Agropyron podperae
Agropyron pulcherrimum
Agropyron trichophorum
Elymus hispidus
Elytrigia intermedia

=== Common names ===
Intermediate wheatgrass is the most widely used common name for Thinopyrum intermedium in the United States. The name "intermediate" probably refers to the height of the plant, which is generally somewhat shorter than T. ponticum known by the common name of "tall wheatgrass".

Wild triga is the common name that was given to Thinopyrum intermedium by researchers at The Rodale Institute. The name was intended to distinguish varieties of the species developed for use as a perennial grain crop from forage cultivars which are identified by the common name "intermediate wheatgrass".

Kernza is a trademarked name held by the Land Institute for the processed grains of intermediate wheatgrass.

== Origin and distribution ==
The native range of intermediate wheatgrass extends from central and southeastern Europe to Asia Minor. Although it was first brought to the United States in 1907, the first successful introduction was from the Caucasus region in 1932. The plant can now be found growing wild throughout the Western United States and Western Canada.

T. intermedium is best adapted to:

- Regions with annual rainfall between 12 and 30 inches (30 and 76 cm)
- Soil with a pH between 5.6 and 8.4
- Locations with full exposure to the sun
- A wide range of soils but with a minimum depth of 16 inches (41 cm)
- Locations where the minimum temperature exceeds −38 °F (−39 °C)

== Seed production ==
Although the primary use of T. intermedium is as forage, seed production is essential because farmers and ranchers continue to establish new stands by planting the seed. In 1988 over 500 metric tons (550 short tons) of seed were harvested in Saskatchewan alone, although more recently the harvest has fallen to less than 225 metric tons (248 short tons) in that Canadian province. Average seed yields are about 330 pounds per acre (370 kg/ha), but on-farm yields of up to 880 pounds per acre (990 kg/ha) have been achieved. Seed is generally produced in rows spaced 30 to 36 inches (76 to 91 cm) apart. The wide row spacing (relative to grain crops like wheat) allows for sustained seed yields for five to ten years. Without spacing and occasional tillage between the rows, yields decline rapidly as the plant population becomes increasingly dense through rhizome spread. Despite this, T. intermedium is still considered lesser than wheat by some, as its seeds are comparatively tiny.

== Breeding for grain production ==
T. intermedium has been widely hybridized with wheat in the effort to transfer traits such as disease resistance or perenniality. Transferring leaf rust- and powdery mildew-resistance to wheat has been a special interest. But, attempts to directly de novo domesticate the species into a grain crop did not commence until workers at the Rodale Research Center began to evaluate collections in 1983. In 1989, after assessing 300 collections, the workers selected the best twenty based on grain yield and seed quality. The selected collections were allowed to intermate, and 380 progeny were evaluated between 1991 and 1994. The best eleven plants, plus three from another evaluation, had intermated, causing a second cycle to begin. Seeds from the best plants in the second cycle were passed to scientists at The Land Institute, where the research has continued.

In 2001 and 2002, seed from the first and second breeding cycles of the Rodale Research Center was planted at The Land Institute. In late 2003, 1,000 individual plants were dug up and vegetatively propagated to obtain three clones of each plant. The 3,000 resulting plants were randomly transplanted to the field on a three foot by three-foot grid. In this manner, genetic differences between plants were separated from environmental influences. In 2005, heads were harvested from every plant and threshed to remove the seeds. The seeds were both counted and weighed to determine the yield per seed head and weight per seed. The fifty plants with the highest yield and largest seed were selected to intermate in 2004.

In the fall of 2004, 4,000 progeny were planted to establish the second cycle of breeding at The Land Institute. In 2008, these plants were harvested separately by using a power scythe and threshed in a combine. Again the best 50 plants were selected, this time based on yield per head, seed size, shortness, and free-threshing ability.

The selection methods described above have increased seed size and yield by about 10 to 18% per cycle. But perhaps of greater importance has been the discovery of two Mendelian traits. The first is dwarfing, which results in stems about 30 centimetres (1 ft) shorter than wild-type plants and short, erect leaves. The second is a more subtle change in head shape which results in thick, non-brittle heads and slightly larger seeds. Both of these traits appear to be controlled by dominant genes.

The whole process mentioned above is called mass selection, which is breeding and selecting the best individuals to spawn the next generation. (Mass breeding, however, is a process by which large quantities of genetically diverse individuals are made.) Due to T. intermedium's grass-like structures, some believe that it still needs to be domesticated as much as possible to resemble wheat.

The fact that T. intermedium is a perennial grass is important with regards to its use as a grain. The plant persists and can be harvested year after year, and its domestication would yield an additional three months of agriculture; its leaves are most active in the months in which common wheat is not active: July through September. Despite the promise, the yield per acre of T. intermedium is 26% of the yield of traditional wheat. Because of this, some are putting effort into hybridizing wheat and T. intermedium instead of attempting to domesticate T. intermedium to a more acceptable yield.

== Hybridization with wheat ==
T. intermedium has been hybridized with wheat since the 1940s. This confers some advantages. First, hybridization of T. intermedium with wheat transfers fungal- and viral-resistances to domestic wheat plants. However, which specific genes protect against which specific fungi is not known. T. elongatum and T. intermedium impart a total of four leaf rust resistance genes, while T. intermedium confers two powdery mildew resistance genes. There's evidence that T. intermedium also has resistance to wheat streak mosaic virus, the Aceria tosichella mite, Barley yellow dwarf, and others. These conferred genes in wheat help increase yield and hardiness in times of environmental strain. Second, T. intermedium also has genes that improve bread making when hybridized with common wheat. While this may not seem like an important characteristic, better bread may mean more calories, feeding more people. In addition, bread that stays fresh longer may provide more opportunities for people to be adequately fed, and/or the bread can be transported to areas without much food access.

== Strategies for domestication ==
The Land Institute has been working to develop viable wheat and Thinopyrum intermedium hybrids since 2001, and there have been several successful strains that shared 14 T. intermedium chromosomes and 42 wheat chromosomes. These hybrids perform better regarding yield and resistance than either of their parents. Loss of perenniality is a common problem with hybridization attempts. All other desired characteristics are present in the hybrids – large seeds, good yields, etc. However, crosses between durum wheat and T. intermedium have resulted in hybrids that do exhibit perenniality in addition to other desired characteristics (increased vigor, hardiness in colder weather, good yield).

There are three general strategies for domestication of T. intermedium with the purpose of creating an alternative grain crop:

1. One strategy is to domesticate T. intermedium through mass breeding and selection to create a strain that mimics wheat's seed size and yield but retains T. intermedium's natural resistances, hardiness, and perenniality. In other words, this strategy gives T. intermedium more wheat-like characteristics;
2. A second strategy is to hybridize wheat with T. intermedium to create a strain of wheat that mimics T. intermedium's resistance and perenniality but retains wheat's seed size and yield. In other words, this second strategy gives wheat more T. intermedium-like characteristics. Researchers hope that these two strategies will progress and meet in the middle.
3. A third strategy is to benefit from what we know about the molecular events that led to the domestication of evolutionarily related grasses such as wheat and barley. Mutations in so-called domestication genes in wild ancestors led to the domestication phenotypes that characterize these crops today. If related genes can be identified in T. intermedium it may be possible to mutate them by new breeding technologies (targeted mutagenesis, genome editing), and in this way accelerate domestication.

== Kernza ==
=== Diseases and pests ===
Black grassland bugs can be a problem for the cultivation of Thinopyrum intermedium, as they can cause severe damage on the wheatgrass plants. Heavy infestation can reduce seed production and coupled with unfavourable conditions lead to plant mortality. By feeding on the plants, the bugs destroy cells and the destruct or remove chlorophyll, leaving whitish spots on the plant leaves.

=== Disease and pest management ===
Thinopyrum intermedium is a perennial plant, which means that usual methods of disease management used for annual grain production might not be applicable and efficient. Also, common herbicides used in annual grain cultivation are not approved for use with intermediate wheatgrass. Therefore, different approaches are necessary to disrupt diseases cycles of multiple pathogens in Kernza grain production.

Resistance is an important factor when managing the perennial grain crop, as resistance is a defense which is active continuously and no application of active substances is needed throughout the year. T. intermedium has shown resistance against four major cereal pathogens. These are Barley yellow dwarf and wheat streak mosaic diseases, viral diseases which can cause complete yield loss without control and tan spot caused by the fungus Pyrenophora tritici-repentis and take-all caused by the fungus Gaeumannomyces graminis var. tritici.

=== Cultivars of Kernza ===
Certified seed of the improved seed material are available at Crop Improvement Associations or from commercial sources. The cultivars differ in area of origin, selection traits and in regard to their purpose.

=== Nutritional values and use of Kernza ===
Kernza contains higher values of protein, ash content and dietary fiber content when compared with wheat. Further 100 gram uncooked Kernza provides 1540 kilojoule (368 kcal) of food energy and is a good source of calcium (120 mg) as well as iron (5.5 mg). Comparing Kernza to white wheat berries, calcium contents are 4.8 times higher and iron values are more than double. Kernza contains gluten but is deficient in high molecular weight glutenin, which limits its use especially in baking. The higher fat content in Kernza may increase overall rancidity, but a higher antioxidant content than wheat may offer a protective effect. There are existing products with Kernza such as Honey Toasted Kernza by Cascadian Farms and Patagonia Provisions’ Kernza beer.

=== Management practices ===
There is little known about management practices regarding specifically Kernza. According to the official Kernza webpage Kernza is already being intercropped with legumes and in an article of the StarTribune, it is said that in the Upper Midwest of the US, Kernza should be sown not later than the 1st of September to ensure root establishment before winter. However, there are still field trials being done to examine nitrogen, phosphorus and potassium fertilisation rates and application timing to maximize grain and forage yields.

=== Cold stress acclimation ===
An important aspect of cold stress acclimation is increased expression of DNA repair genes. In T. intermedium, conditions of freezing stress are associated with large increases in expression of two DNA repair genes (one gene product a photolyase and the other, a protein employed in nucleotide excision repair).

== Uses ==
The species has gained the Royal Horticultural Society's Award of Garden Merit as an ornamental.

=== Forage ===
Thinopyrum intermedium is among the most productive forage species for the western US. Because it heads relatively late, it can be grown effectively in mixture with alfalfa to increase its productivity, longevity, and forage quality. It regrows slowly after grazing or cutting, making it best suited to management with a single harvest per year. If multiple harvests are needed per year, other species will be more productive. If managed well, stands can persist for up to 50 years.

=== Habitat ===
Habitat for wildlife - intermediate wheatgrass can be an excellent food source for grazing and browsing animals. Left unharvested, the vegetation is a good nesting habitat for some birds and waterfowl. Generally, it is not an invasive plant and coexists well with native plant species.

=== Soil management ===
Soil management by way of erosion control and land rehabilitation are additional uses for this plant. It establishes quickly to form a protective mat of roots and rhizomes, even when planted on soils degraded by earth moving or mining. Within five years, stands have produced up to 7,000 pounds per acre (7,800 kg/ha) of dry root mass in the top 8 inches (20 cm) of soil. Heavy root production holds the soil in place and restores its natural fertility by increasing soil carbon.

=== Grain ===
Thinopyrum intermedium is a perennial grain crop. In 1983, the Rodale Research Center evaluated close to 100 species of perennial grasses to identify those with good potential for development into perennial grain crops. Intermediate wheatgrass was selected as the most promising species based on flavor, ease of threshing, large seed size, resistance to shattering, lodging resistance, ease of harvest, and perennial growth. Intermediate wheatgrass is nutritionally similar to wheat, and the grain can be ground into flour and used for food products, including muffins, tortillas, pancakes, cookies, crackers, bread, beer and whisky. Some products have been marketed under the trade name Kernza.

== Gallery ==
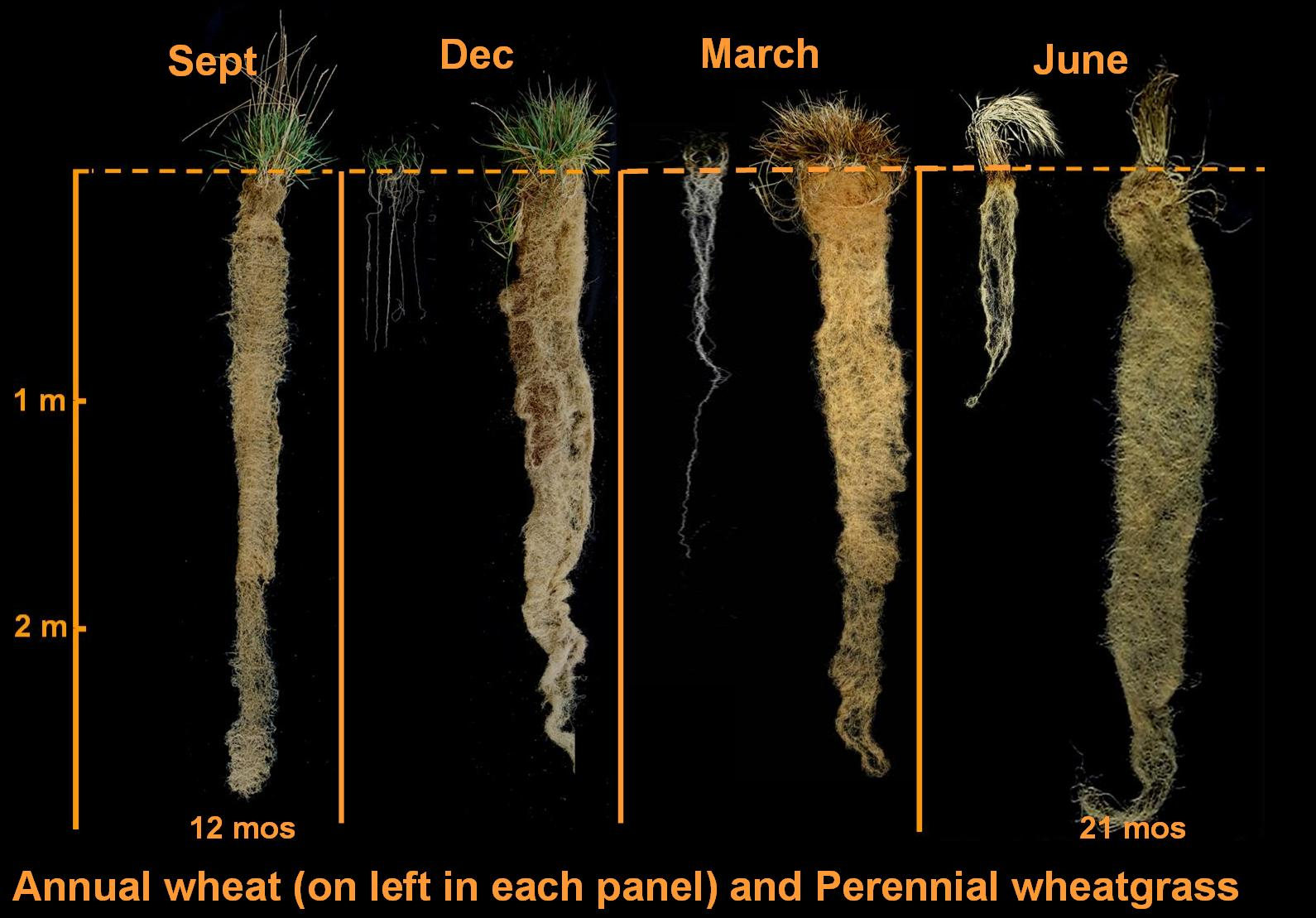
Roots compared to those of wheat (at left in each month)

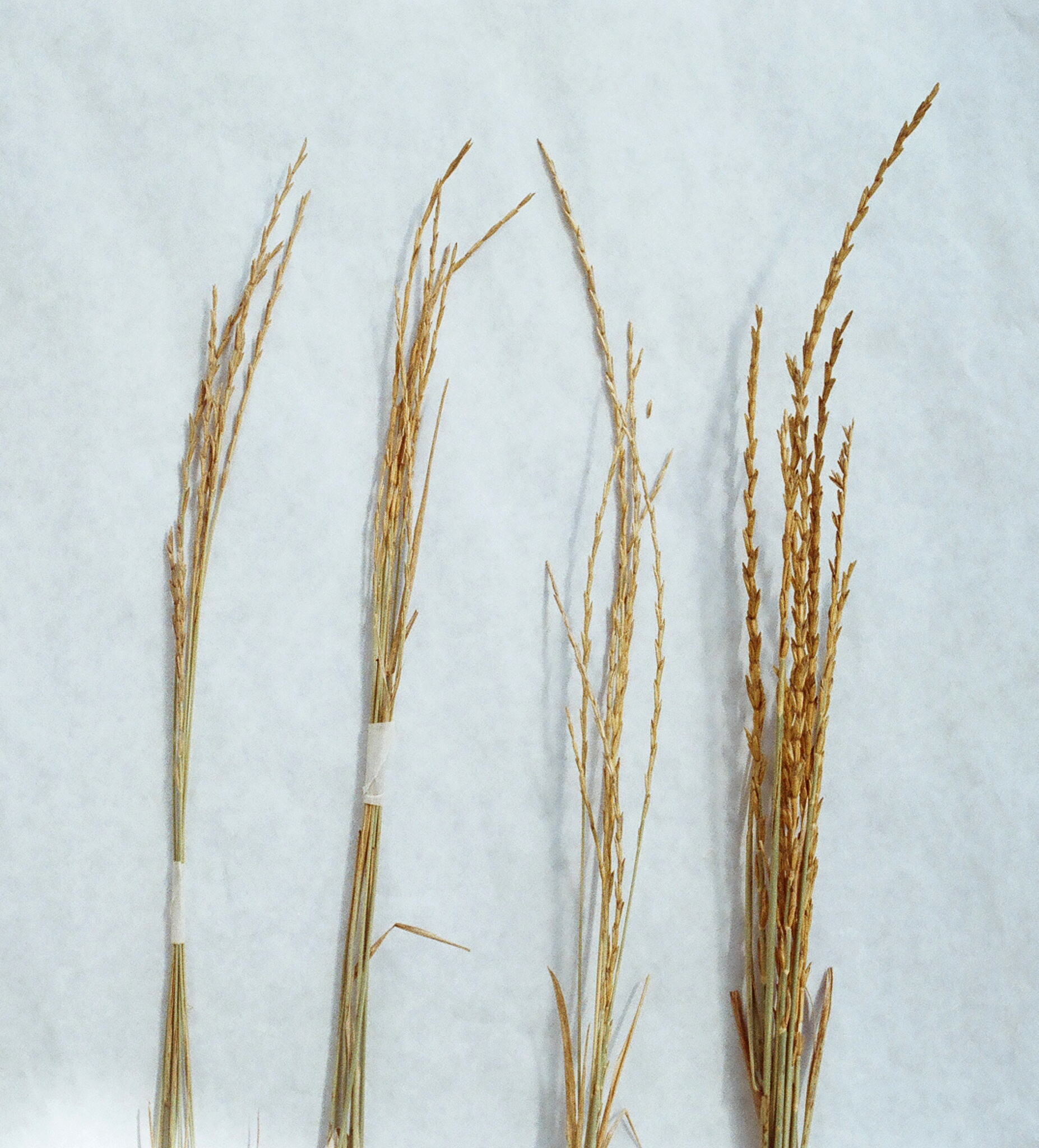
Abnormally thick heads (far right) compared to those of wild-type plants

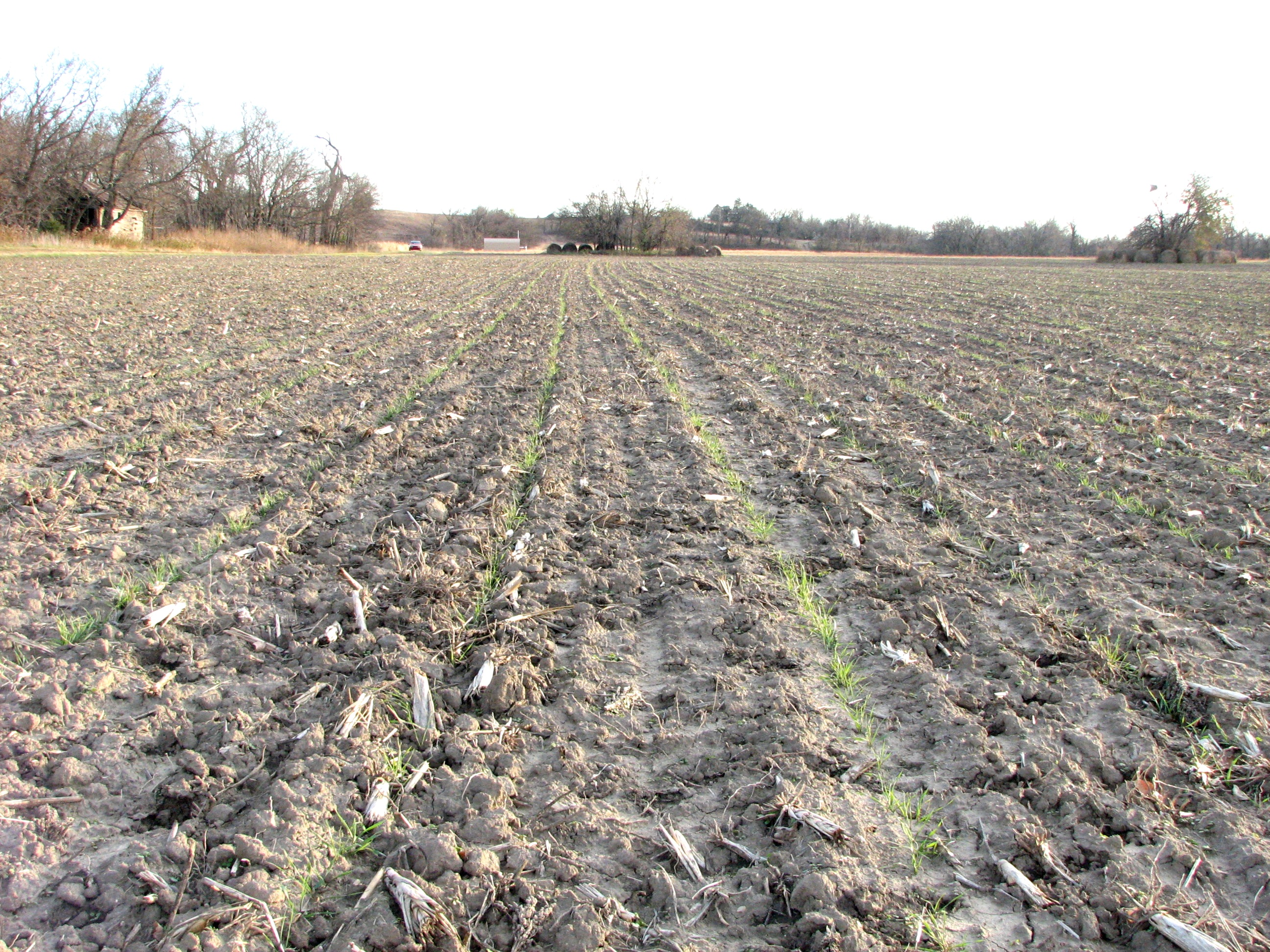
New seeding in 30-inch (760 mm) rows

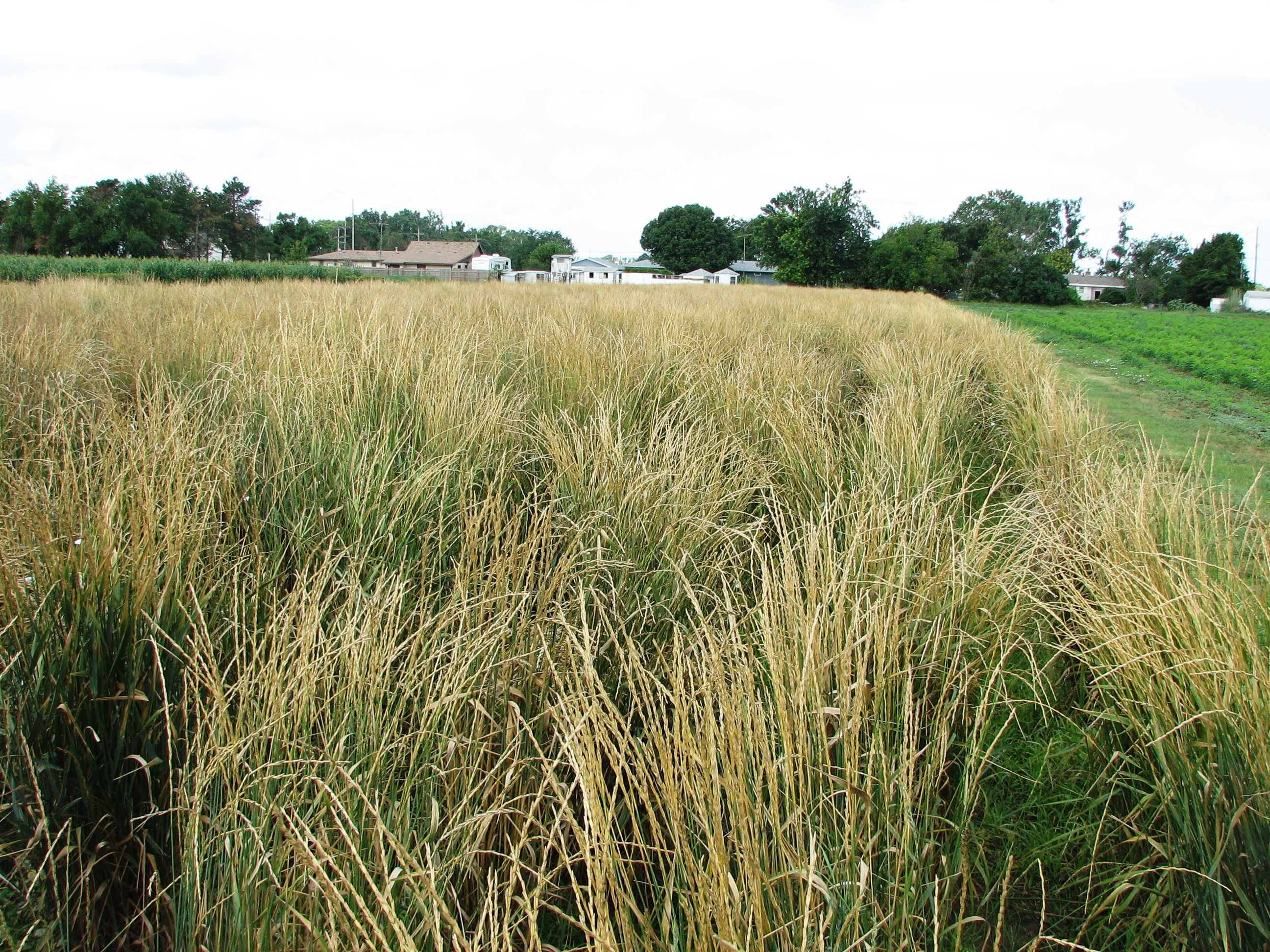
Breeding nursery

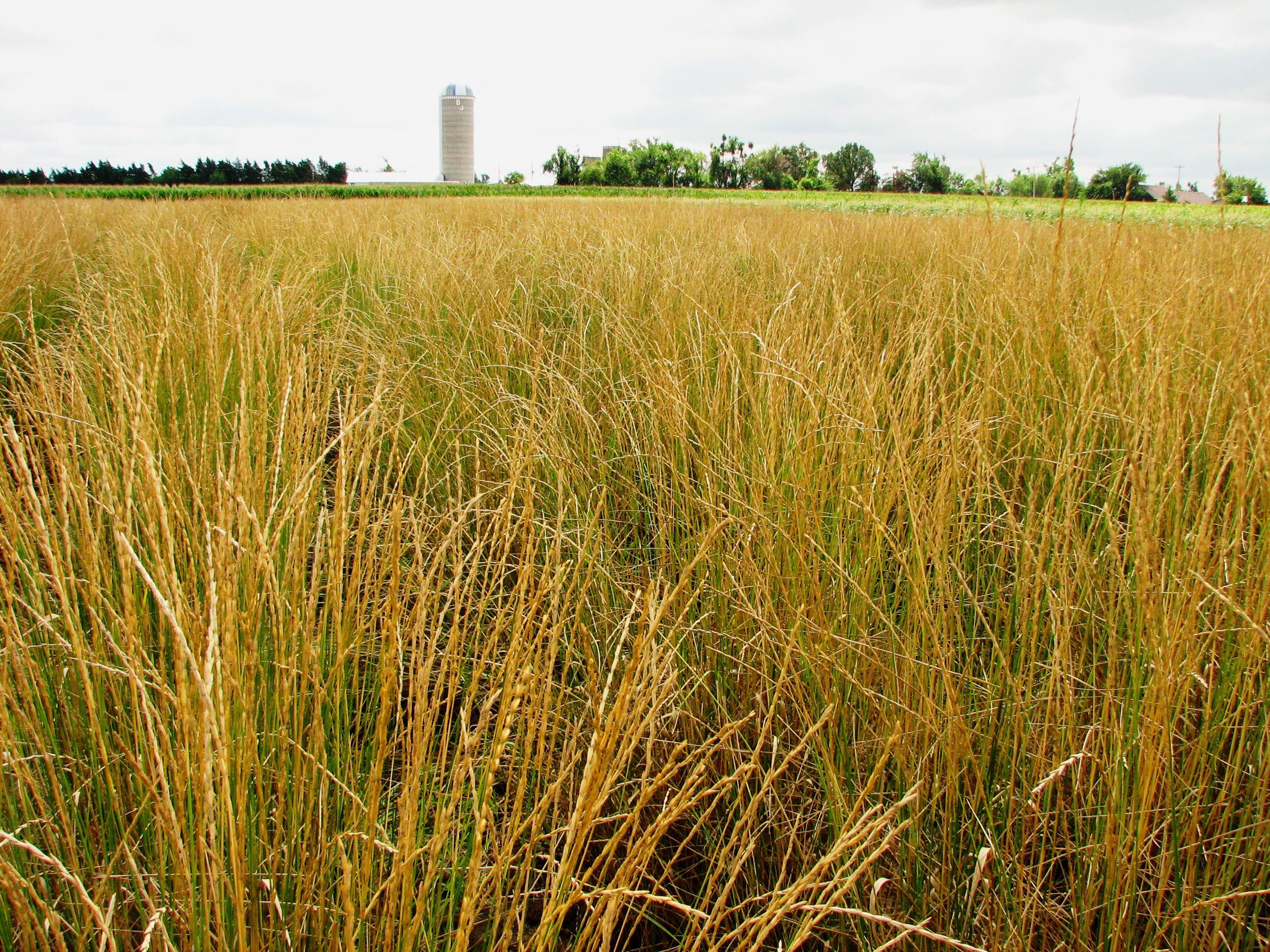

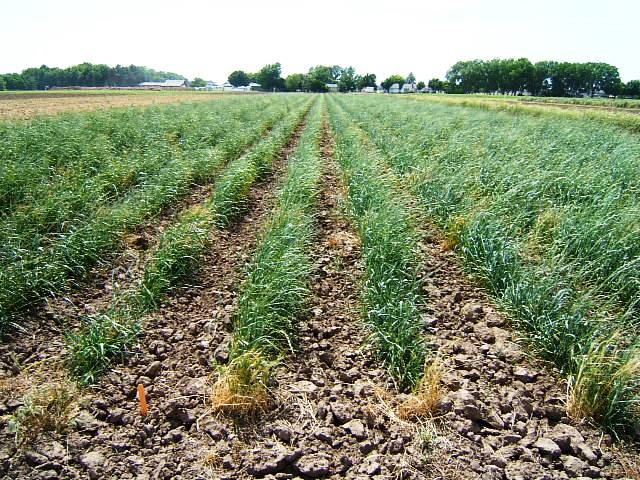
Young plants

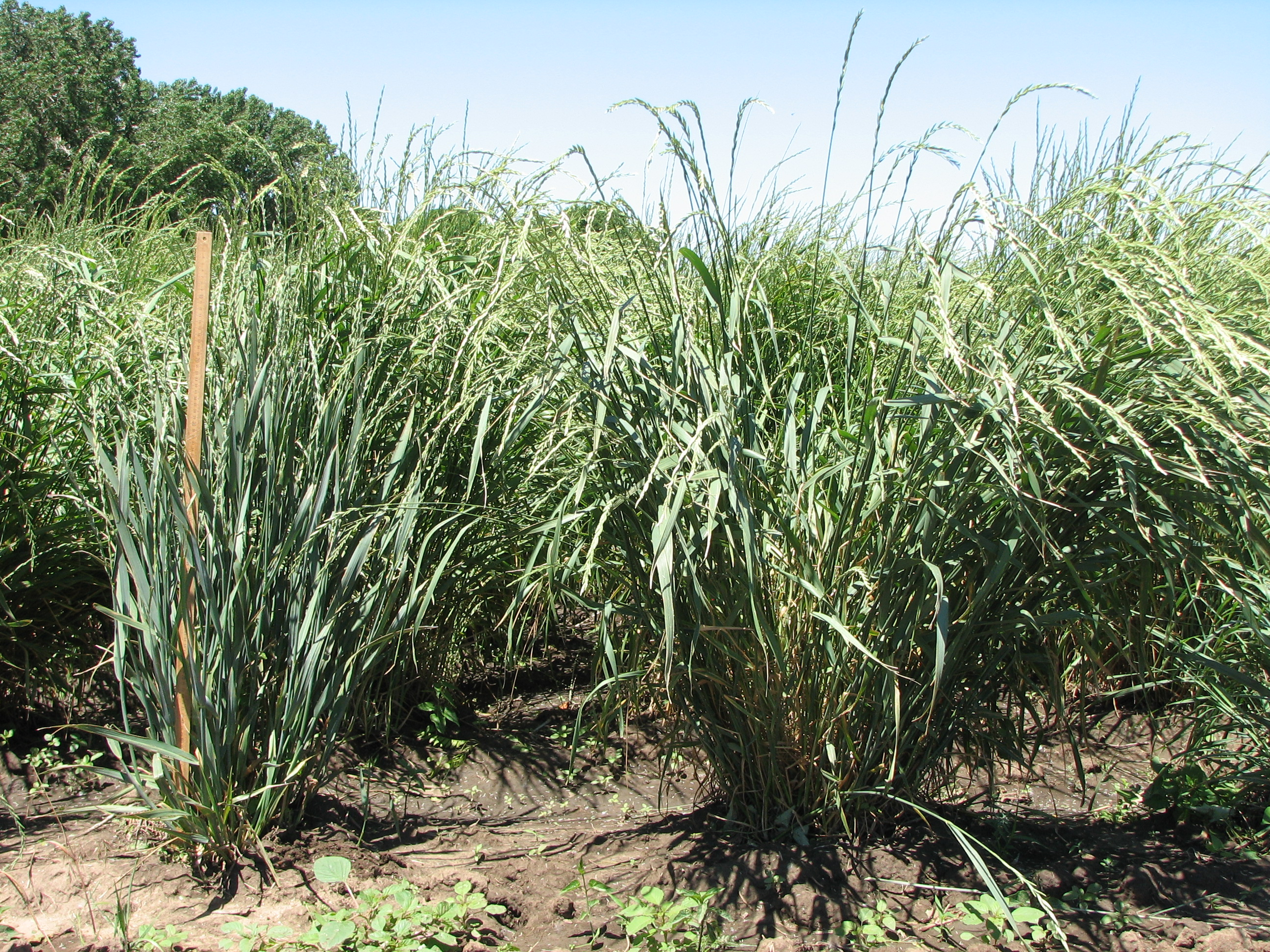
Dwarf plant (left) compared to a standard plant (right)

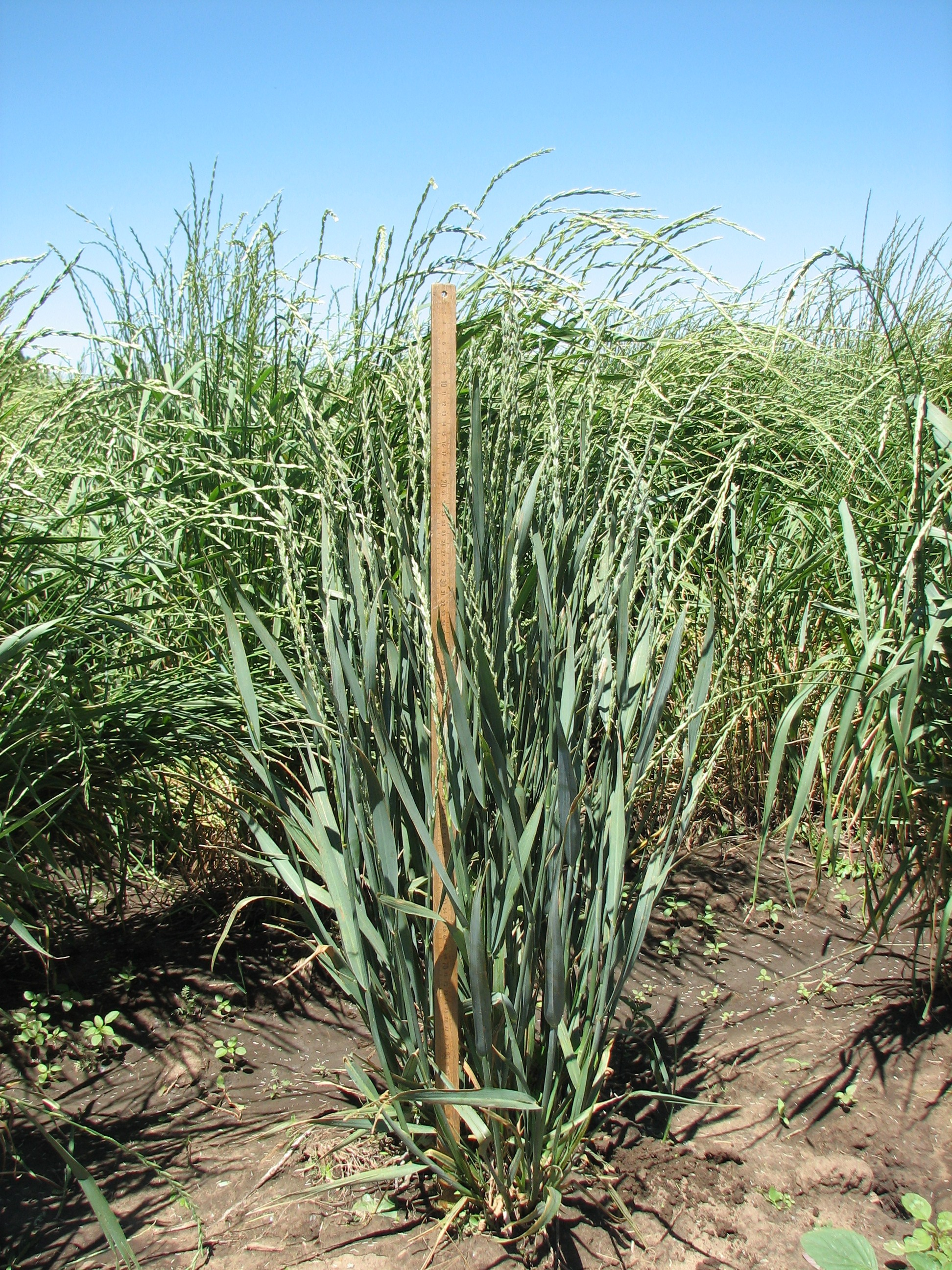
A genetically dwarfed plant

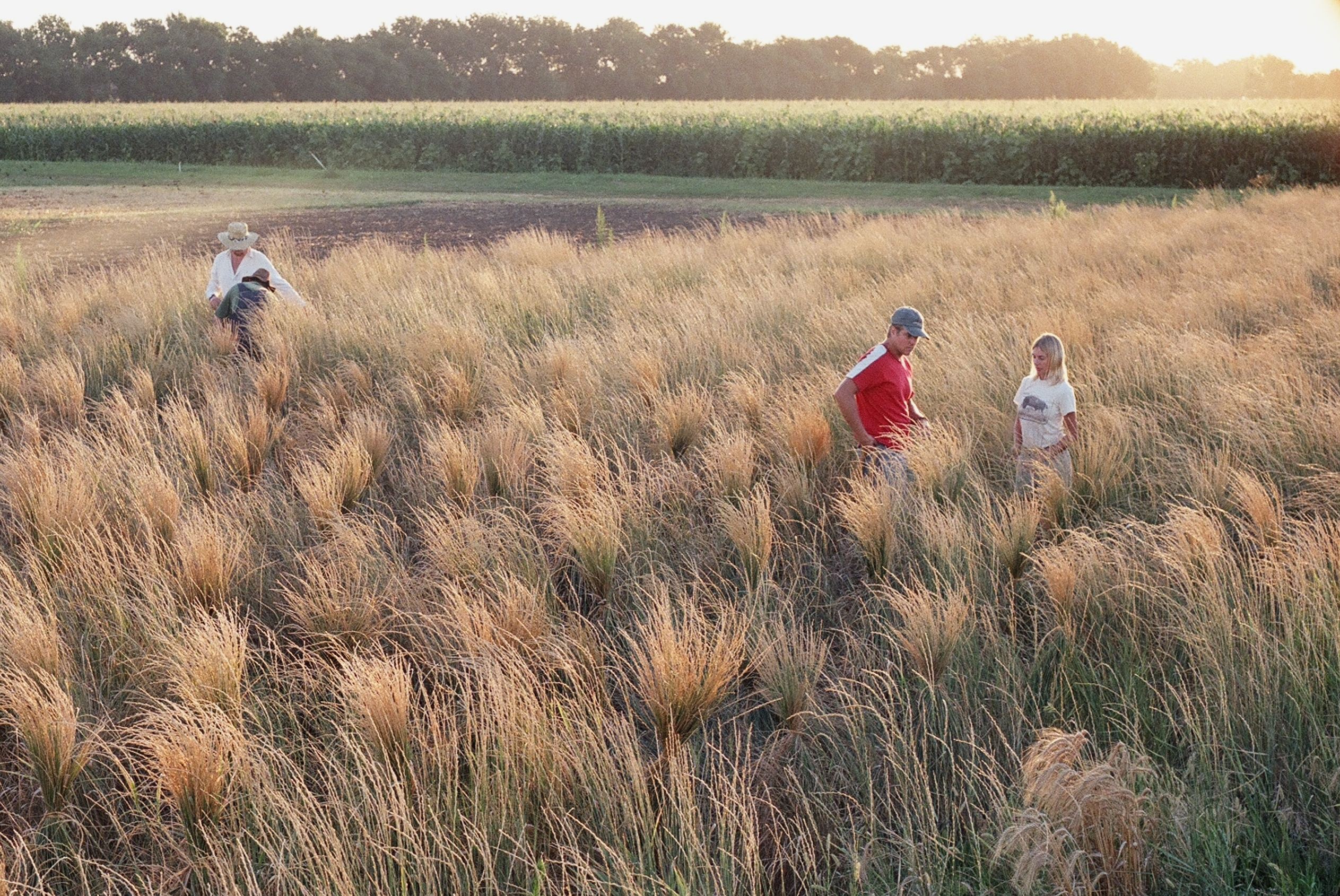
Tied into bundles to prepare for harvest and threshing.

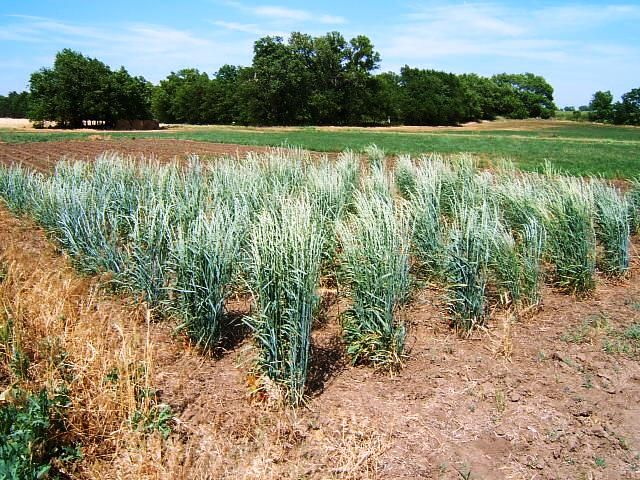
Fifty selected plants (2 clones each) are grown in isolation to allow random intermating.

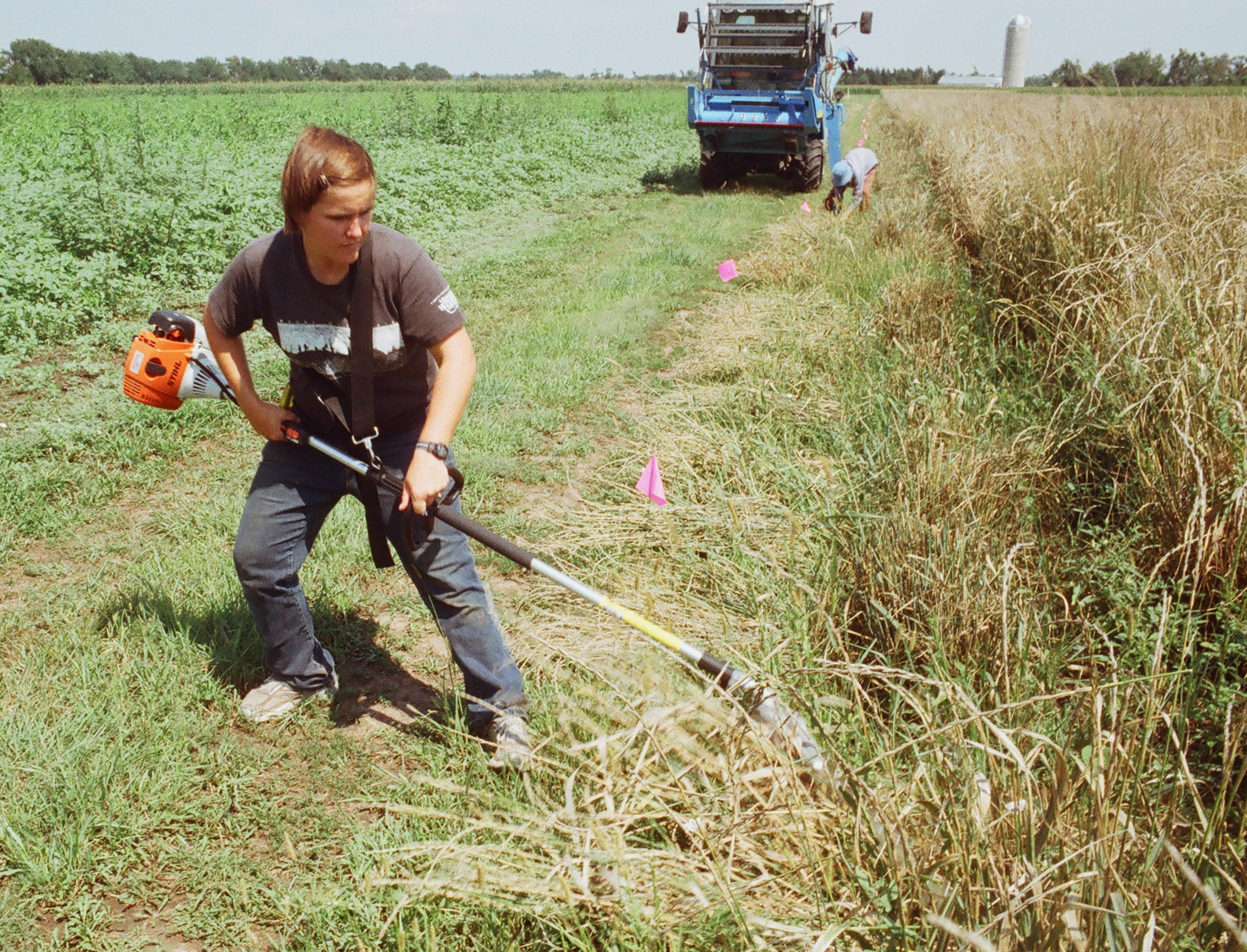
Individual plants are harvested and threshed in a combine.

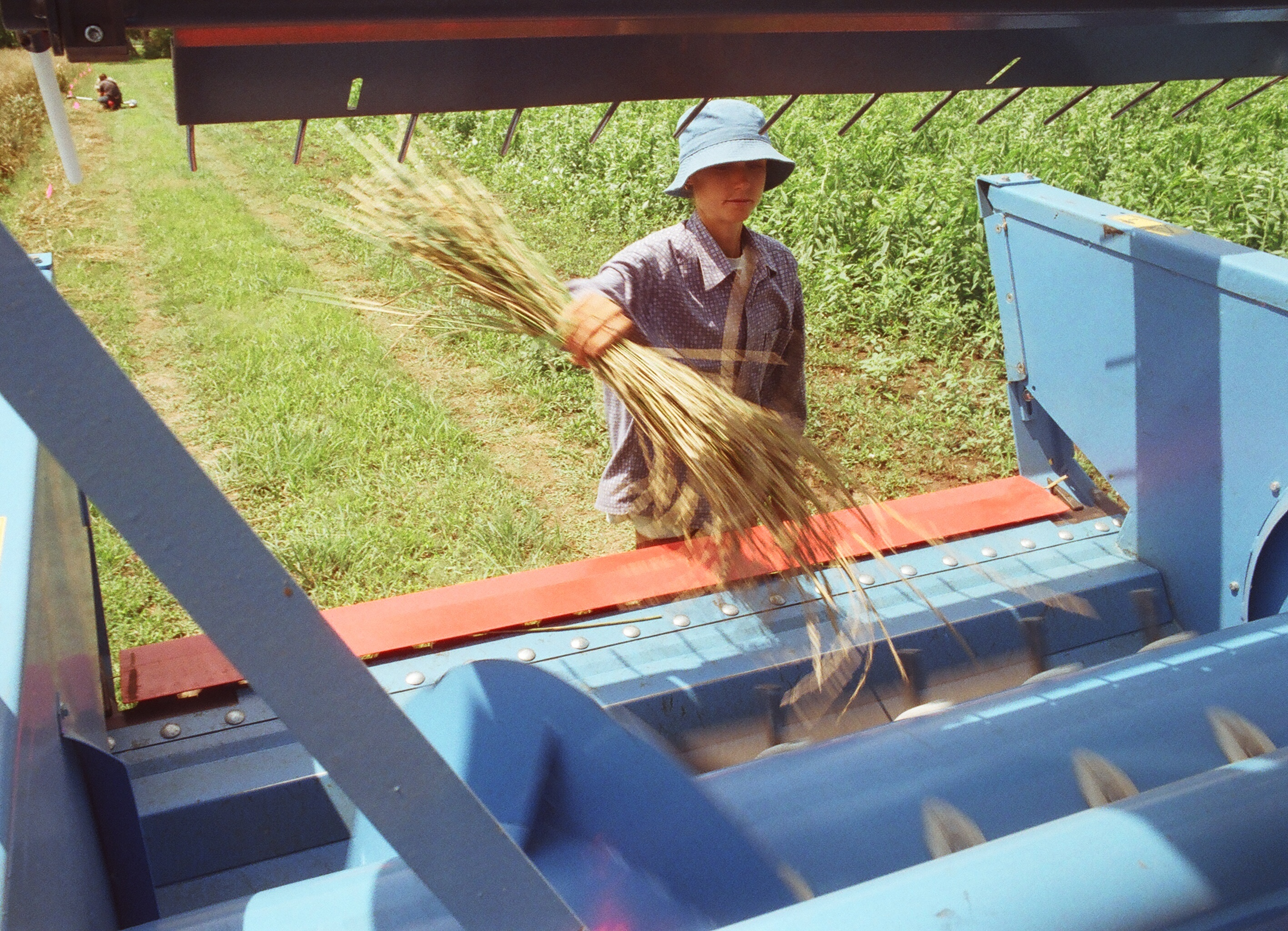
Feeding a single plant into a plot combine for threshing.

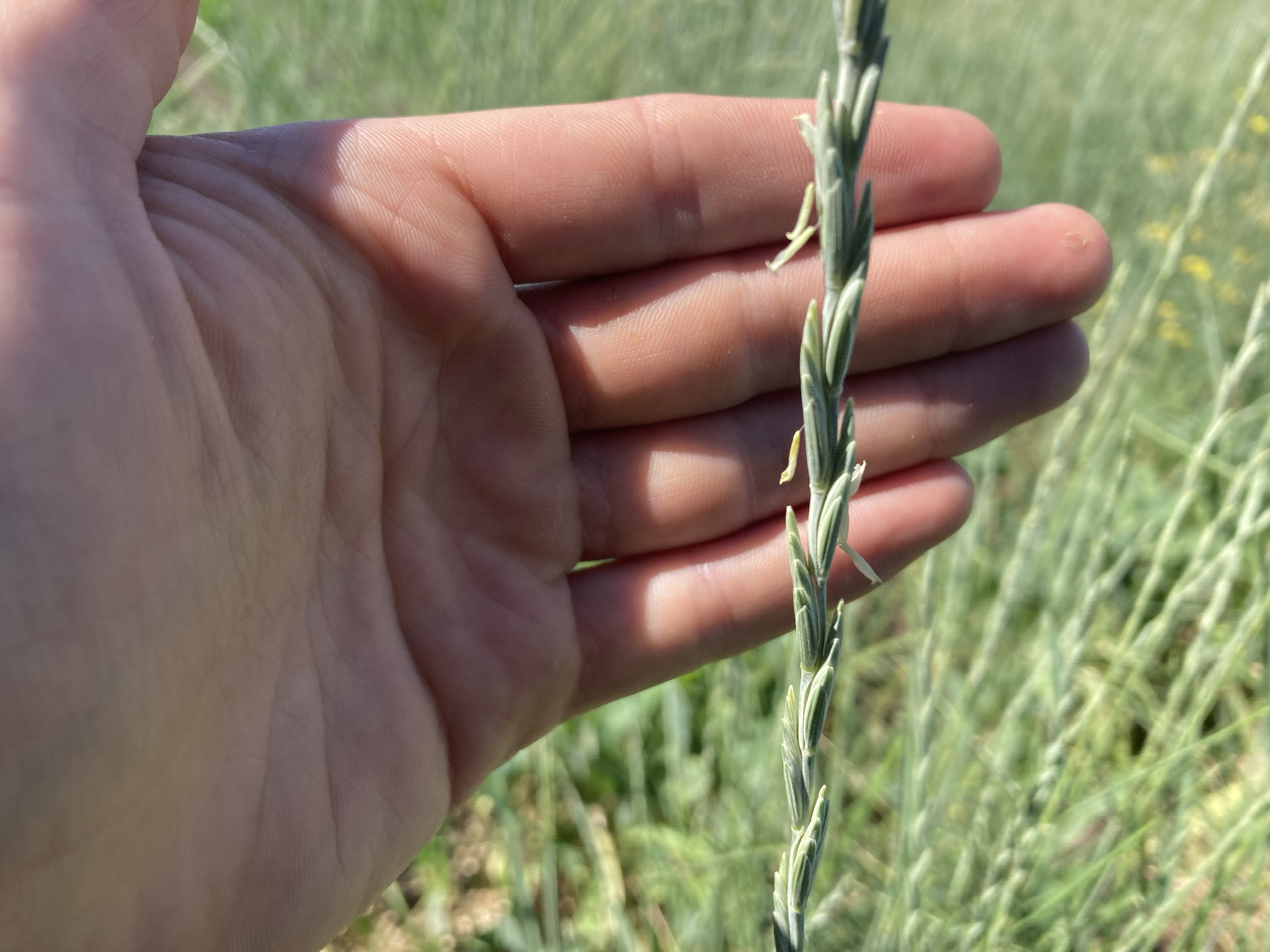
