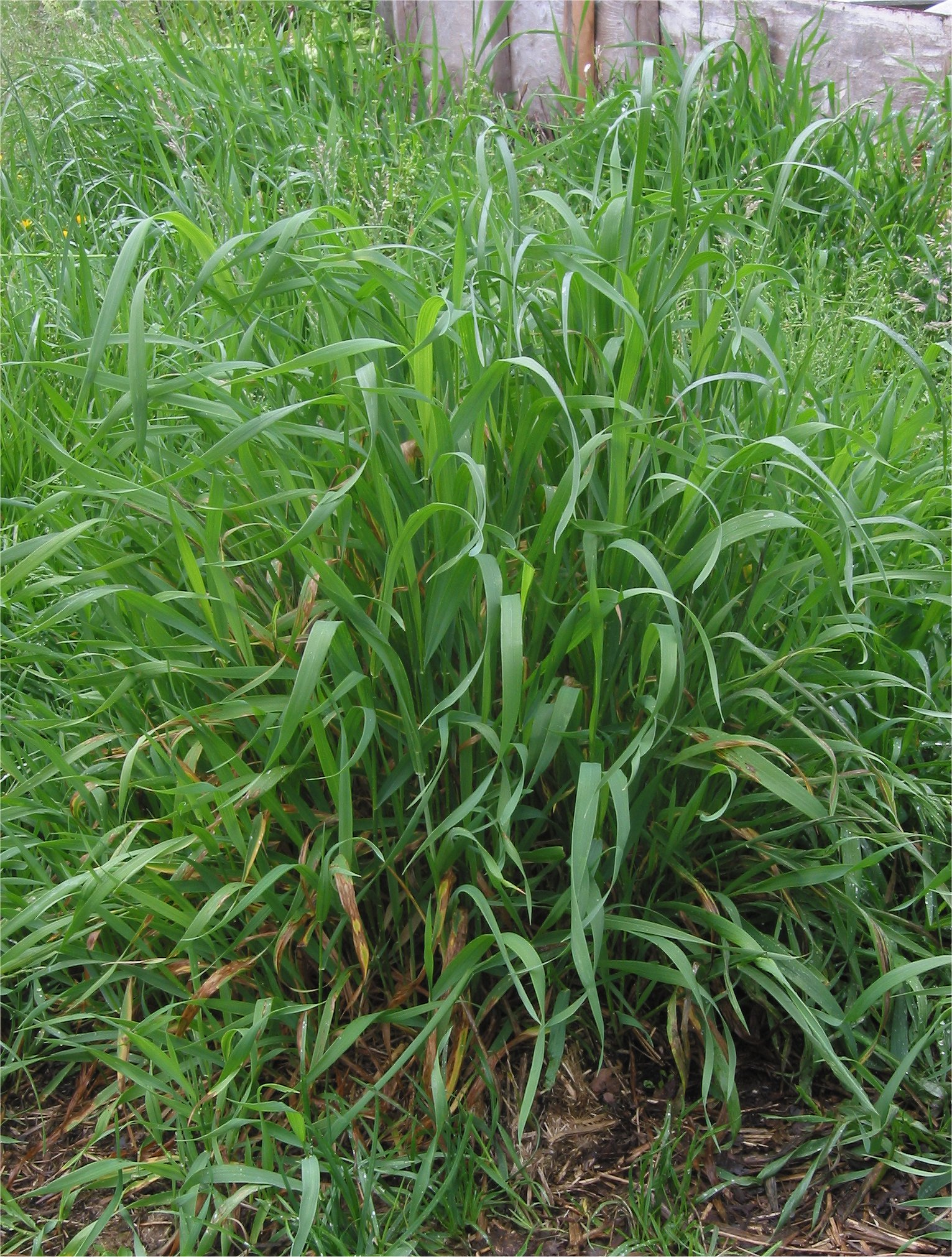

Scientific classification
- Kingdom: Plantae
- Clade: Embryophytes
- Clade: Tracheophytes
- Clade: Spermatophytes
- Clade: Angiosperms
- Clade: Monocots
- Clade: Commelinids
- Order: Poales
- Family: Poaceae
- Subfamily: Pooideae
- Genus: Elymus
- Species: E. repens

Binomial name
- Elymus repens (L.) Gould

Synonyms
- Agropyron repens (L.) P.Beauv.; Elytrigia repens (L.) Desv. ex Nevski; Triticum repens L.

= Elymus repens =

Species of grass

Elymus repens, commonly known as couch grass /kuːtʃ/, is a very common perennial species of grass native to most of Europe, Asia, the Arctic, and northwest Africa. It has been brought into other mild northern climates for forage or erosion control, but it often becomes invasive in the area.

Elymus repens isn't just called common couch, it's also known as twitch, quick grass, quitch grass (also just quitch), dog grass, quackgrass, scutch grass, and witchgrass.

== Description ==
It has creeping rhizomes which enable it to grow rapidly across grassland. It has flat, hairy leaves with upright flower spikes. The stems ('culms') grow to 40–150 centimetres (16–59 in) tall; the leaves are linear, 15–40 centimetres (5.9–15.7 in) long and 3–10 millimetres (0.12–0.39 in) broad at the base of the plant, with leaves higher on the stems 2–8.5 millimetres (0.079–0.335 in) broad. The flower spike is 10–30 millimetres (0.39–1.18 in) long, with spikelets 1–2 centimetres (0.39–0.79 in) long, 5–7 millimetres (0.20–0.28 in) broad and 3 millimetres (0.12 in) thick with three to eight florets. The glumes are 7–12 millimetres (0.28–0.47 in) long, usually without an awn or with only a short one.

It flowers at the end of June through to August in the Northern Hemisphere.

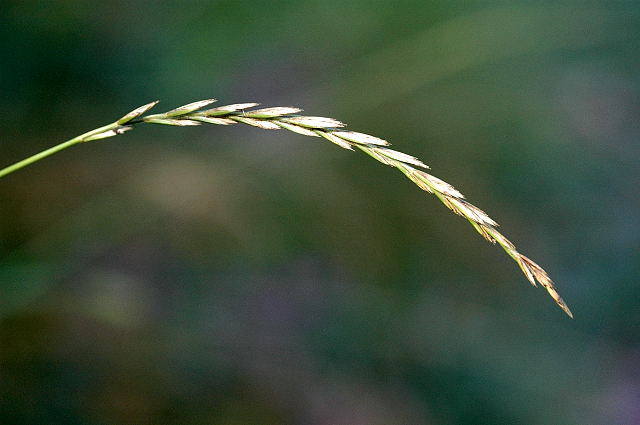
Flower spike

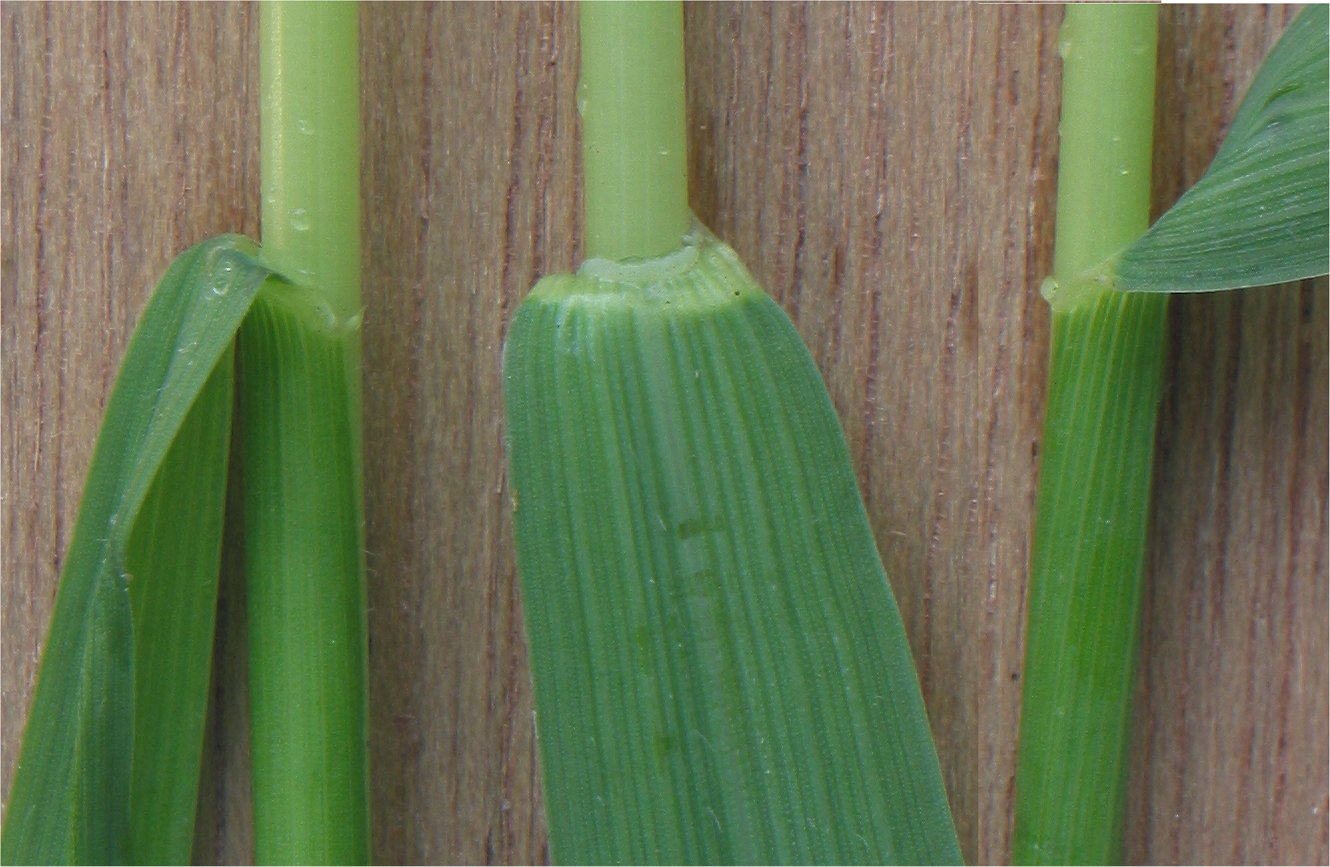
Blunt ligule 1 mm high, also showing a few very fine hairs of the plant

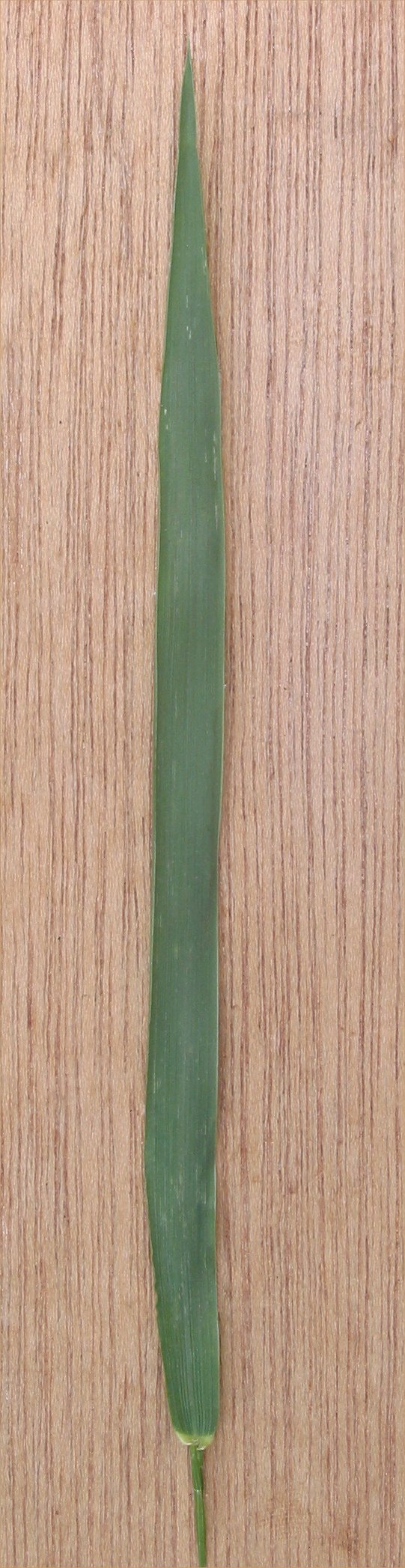
Showing the leaf is dull green, mainly parallel, with auricles and ribbed

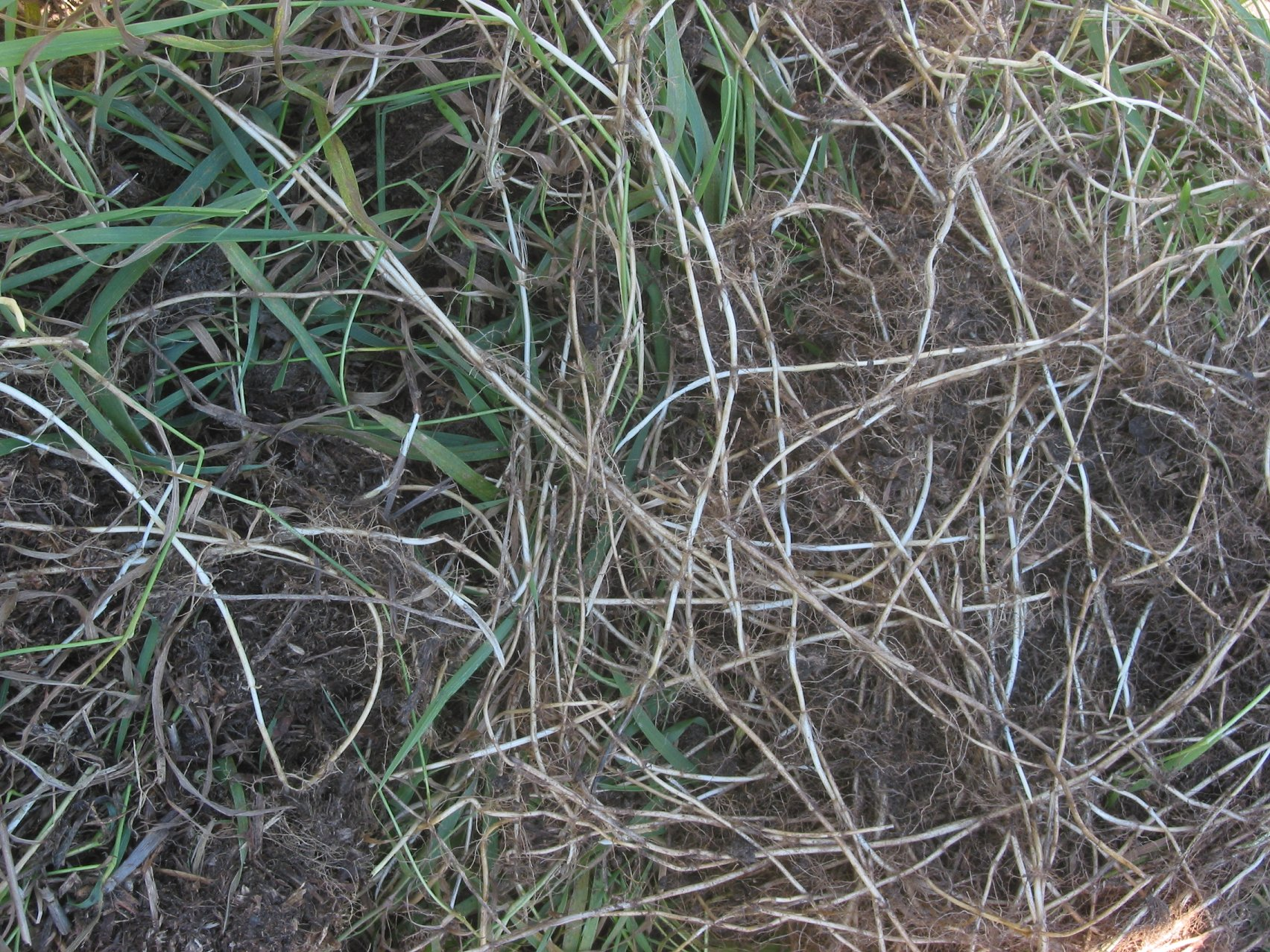
Rhizomes

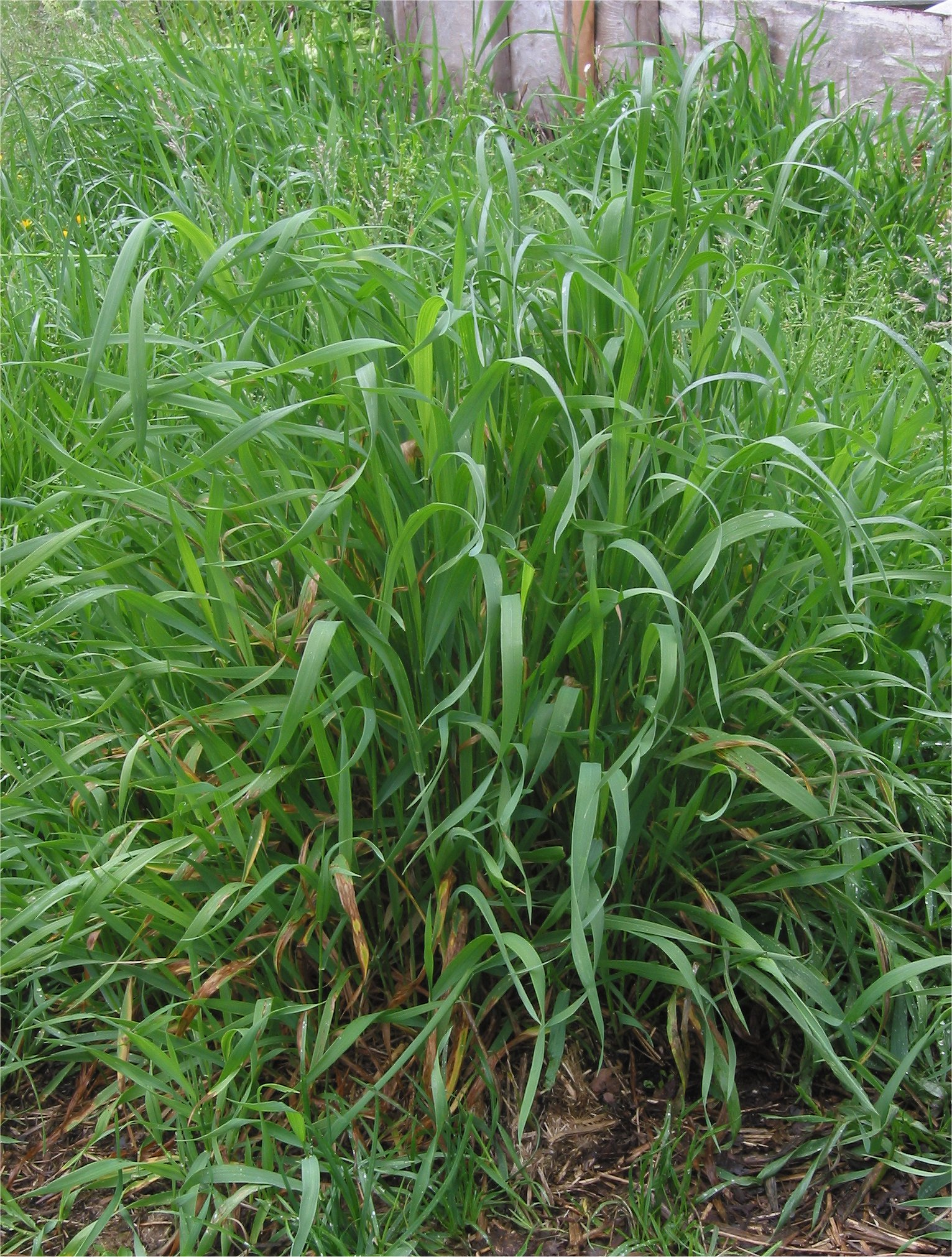
General appearance of the plant including tuft shape

== Taxonomy ==
Various taxonomic subdivisions of this species have been proposed. Moreover, it is assigned to various genera (Elymus, Elytrigium, Agropyron). In a recent classification, three subspecies are distinguished, one of these with an additional variety:

- Elytrigia repens subsp. repens. Throughout most of the range of the species.
  - Elytrigia repens subsp. repens var. repens. Awns usually absent or if present, very short.
  - Elytrigia repens subsp. repens var. aristata (Döll) P.D.Sell. Awns present, up to 15 mm long.
- Elytrigia repens subsp. elongatiformis (Drobow) Tzvelev (syn. Elytrigia elongatiformis (Drobow) Nevski). Central and southwestern Asia, far southeastern Europe (Ukraine).
- Elytrigia repens subsp. longearistata N. R. Cui. Western China (Xinjiang).

Hybrids are recorded with several related grasses, including Elytrigia juncea (Elytrigia × laxa (Fr.) Kerguélen), Elytrigia atherica (Elytrigia × drucei Stace), and with the barley species Hordeum secalinum (× Elytrordeum langei (K. Richt.) Hyl.).

== Ecology ==
The foliage is an important forage grass for many grazing mammals. The seeds are eaten by several species of grassland birds, particularly buntings and finches. The caterpillars of some Lepidoptera use it as a foodplant, e.g. the Essex skipper (Thymelicus lineola).

== Eradication ==
Couch grass has become naturalised throughout much of the world, and is often listed as an invasive weed. It is very difficult to remove from garden environments, as the thin rhizomes become entangled among the roots of shrubs and perennials, and each severed piece of rhizome can develop into a new plant. It may be possible to loosen the earth around the plant, and carefully pull out the complete rhizome. This is best done in the spring, when disturbed plants can recover. Another method is to dig deep into the ground in order to remove as much of the grass as possible. The area should then be covered with a thick layer of woodchips. To further prevent re-growth, cardboard can be placed underneath the woodchips. The long, white rhizomes will, however, dry out and die if left on the surface. Many herbicides will also control it.

== Applications ==
The dried rhizomes of couch grass were broken up and used as incense in medieval northern Europe where other resin-based types of incense were unavailable. Elymus repens (Agropyron repens) rhizomes have been used in the traditional Austrian medicine against fever, internally as a tea, syrup, or cold maceration in water, or externally applied as a crude drug.
