= Sand couch =

Sand couch is a common name for several plants and may refer to:

- Sporobolus virginicus
- Elytrigia juncea
