= Yenidal, Solhan =

Village in Bingöl Province, Turkey

Yenidal
- Village
- Location within Turkey
- Coordinates: 38.920°N 40.924°E
- Country: Turkey
- Province: Bingöl
- District: Solhan
- Population (2021): 1,009
- Time zone: UTC+3 (TRT)

Yenidal (Kurdish: Çirikê Bonkon) is a village in the Solhan District, Bingöl Province, Turkey. The village is populated by Kurds of the Solaxan tribe and had a population of 1,009 in 2021.

The hamlets of Altınsu, Durmuşlu, Efendideresi, Eskiköy, Kayalar, Küçük, Sarıbaşak, Soğuksu, Şerefmeydanı, Taşlıdere, Taşoluk and Ziyaret are attached to the village.
