= Thinopyrum elongatum =

Scientific classification
- Kingdom: Plantae
- Clade: Tracheophytes
- Clade: Angiosperms
- Clade: Monocots
- Clade: Commelinids
- Order: Poales
- Family: Poaceae
- Subfamily: Pooideae
- Genus: Thinopyrum
- Species: T. elongatum

Binomial name
- Thinopyrum elongatum (Host) D.R.Dewey

Synonyms
- Agropyron scirpeum C.Presl; Elytrigia scirpea (C.Presl) Holub

Species of plant

Thinopyrum elongatum, the tall wheatgrass, is a species of perennial herb in the family Poaceae (true grasses). They have a self-supporting growth form and simple, broad leaves and yellow flowers. Individuals can grow to 5 feet tall.

== Source ==
This article incorporates text from a free content work. Licensed under CC0 (license statement/permission). Text taken from Elytrigia scirpea. Encyclopedia of Life.
