= Oymapınar, Solhan =

Village in Bingöl Province, Turkey

Oymapınar
- Village
- Location within Turkey
- Coordinates: 38.858°N 40.969°E
- Country: Turkey
- Province: Bingöl
- District: Solhan
- Population (2021): 328
- Time zone: UTC+3 (TRT)

Oymapınar (Kurdish: Arzeng) is a village in the Solhan District, Bingöl Province, Turkey. The village is populated by Kurds and had a population of 328 in 2021.

The hamlets of Aydın, Çataldere, Demirkapı, Derindere, Eğridere, Eskiköy, Haliller, Karaoluk and Şenlik are attached to the village.
