= Doğuyeli, Solhan =

Village in Bingöl Province, Turkey

Doğuyeli
- Village
- Location within Turkey
- Coordinates: 38.734°N 41.036°E
- Country: Turkey
- Province: Bingöl
- District: Solhan
- Population (2021): 235
- Time zone: UTC+3 (TRT)

Doğuyeli (Kurdish: Tutêl) is a village in the Solhan District, Bingöl Province, Turkey. The village is populated by Kurds and had a population of 235 in 2021.

The hamlets of Deli, Kuç and Zorge are attached to the village.
