= Şimşirpınar, Solhan =

Village in Bingöl Province, Turkey

Şimşirpınar
- Village
- Location within Turkey
- Coordinates: 38.941°N 41.053°E
- Country: Turkey
- Province: Bingöl
- District: Solhan
- Population (2021): 207
- Time zone: UTC+3 (TRT)

Şimşirpınar (Kurdish: Xelbê) is a village in the Solhan District, Bingöl Province, Turkey. The village is populated by Kurds of the Çolemêrgî tribe and had a population of 207 in 2021.

The hamlet of Çıkrıklı is attached to the village.
