= Yiğitharmanı, Solhan =

Village in Bingöl Province, Turkey

Yiğitharmanı
- Village
- Location within Turkey
- Coordinates: 38.995°N 40.968°E
- Country: Turkey
- Province: Bingöl
- District: Solhan
- Population (2021): 1,111
- Time zone: UTC+3 (TRT)

Yiğitharmanı (Kurdish: Xirbizûn) is a village in the Solhan District, Bingöl Province, Turkey. The village is populated by Kurds and had a population of 1,111 in 2021.

The hamlet of Azat is attached to the village.
