= Düzağaç, Solhan =

Village in Bingöl Province, Turkey

Düzağaç
- Village
- Location within Turkey
- Coordinates: 38.891°N 40.940°E
- Country: Turkey
- Province: Bingöl
- District: Solhan
- Population (2021): 145
- Time zone: UTC+3 (TRT)

Düzağaç (Kurdish: Dijnîg) is a village in the Solhan District, Bingöl Province, Turkey. The village is populated by Kurds and had a population of 145 in 2021.
