= Eşmetaş, Solhan =

Village in Bingöl Province, Turkey

Eşmetaş
- Village
- Location within Turkey
- Coordinates: 38.906°N 41.081°E
- Country: Turkey
- Province: Bingöl
- District: Solhan
- Population (2021): 410
- Time zone: UTC+3 (TRT)

Eşmetaş (Kurdish: Wesmerg) is a village in the Solhan District, Bingöl Province, Turkey. The village is populated by Kurds of the Çolemêrgî tribe and had a population of 410 in 2021.

The hamlets of Aslanlar, Kartal and Şenova are attached to the village.
