= Sükyan, Solhan =

Village in Bingöl Province, Turkey

Sükyan
- Village
- Location within Turkey
- Coordinates: 38.835°N 40.974°E
- Country: Turkey
- Province: Bingöl
- District: Solhan
- Population (2021): 247
- Time zone: UTC+3 (TRT)

Sükyan (Kurdish: Sukyan) is a village in the Solhan District, Bingöl Province, Turkey. The village is populated by Kurds and had a population of 247 in 2021.

The hamlets of Akyürek, Beşdere, Duz, Hıncık, Hor and Karyağdı are attached to the village.
