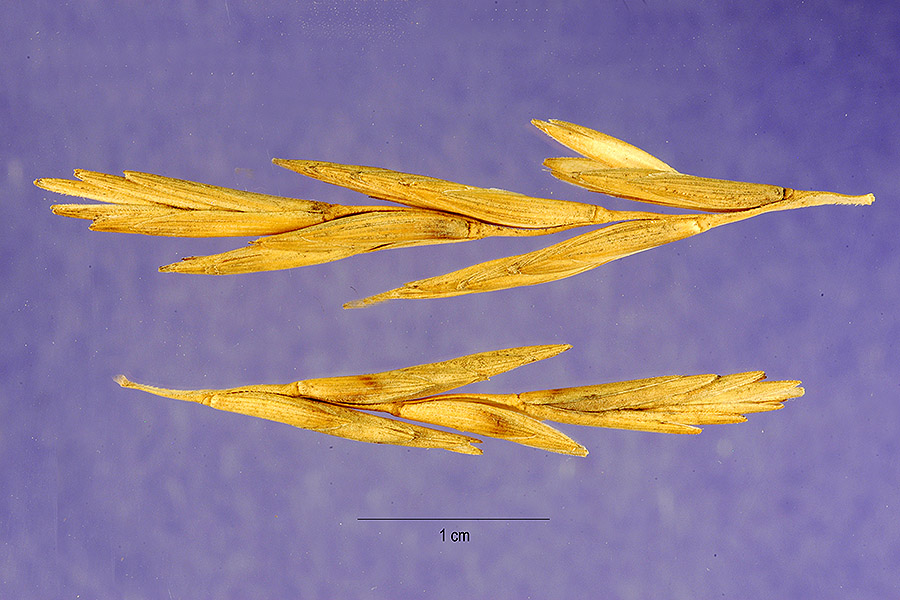
- Thinopyrum junceiforme

Scientific classification
- Kingdom: Plantae
- Clade: Embryophytes
- Clade: Tracheophytes
- Clade: Spermatophytes
- Clade: Angiosperms
- Clade: Monocots
- Clade: Commelinids
- Order: Poales
- Family: Poaceae
- Subfamily: Pooideae
- Supertribe: Triticodae
- Tribe: Triticeae
- Genus: Thinopyrum; Á.Löve

Type species
- Thinopyrum junceum (L.) Á.Löve

Synonyms
- List: Agropyron sect. Junceae H.Prat; Trichopyrum Á.Löve; Lophopyrum Á.Löve; Pauneroa V.Lucía, E.Rico, K.Anamth.-Jon. & M.M.Mart.Ort.

= Thinopyrum =

Genus of grasses

Thinopyrum is a genus of Eurasian and African plants in the grass family.

== Species ==
The following species are recognised in the genus Thinopyrum:

- Thinopyrum acutum (DC.) Banfi - Europe, Turkey
- Thinopyrum bessarabicum (Savul. & Rayss) Á.Löve - Black Sea and Aegean regions
- Thinopyrum corsicum (Hack.) Banfi - Corsica
- Thinopyrum curvifolium (Lange) D.R.Dewey - Spain
- Thinopyrum distichum (Thunb.) Á.Löve - Cape Province; naturalized in Western Australia
- Thinopyrum × duvalii (Loret) Banfi - France, Italy, Turkey
- Thinopyrum elongatum (Host) D.R.Dewey - Mediterranean, Middle East
- Thinopyrum flaccidifolium (Boiss. & Heldr.) Moustakas - Turkey, Greece, Albania, Sicily
- Thinopyrum gentryi (Melderis) D.R.Dewey - Turkey, Iran
- Thinopyrum intermedium (Host) Barkworth & D.R.Dewey - central and southern Europe; central and south-western Asia; naturalized in North America
- Thinopyrum junceiforme (Á.Löve & D.Löve) Á.Löve - northern and central Europe, Selvagens, Morocco; naturalised in Australia
- Thinopyrum junceum (L.) Á.Löve - Mediterranean, Canary Islands, Madeira, Caucasus; naturalized in Australia, New Zealand, Oregon, California, Falkland Islands
- Thinopyrum obtusiflorum (DC.) Banfi - Europe and Caucasus
- Thinopyrum podperae (Nábelek) D.R.Dewey - Turkey, Iraq, Iran
- Thinopyrum turcicum (P.E.McGuire) B.R.Baum & D.A.Johnson - Turkey, Iraq, Iran
- Thinopyrum varnense (Velen.) B.R.Baum & D.A.Johnson - south-eastern Europe
