= Asmakaya, Solhan =

Village in Bingöl Province, Turkey

Asmakaya
- Village
- Location within Turkey
- Coordinates: 38.782°N 41.097°E
- Country: Turkey
- Province: Bingöl
- District: Solhan
- Population (2021): 442
- Time zone: UTC+3 (TRT)

Asmakaya (Kurdish: Perxo, Armenian: Փարխու, romanized: Parku) is a village in the Solhan District, Bingöl Province, Turkey. The village is populated by Kurds of the Tavz tribe and had a population of 442 in 2021.

The hamlets of Akdere, Karay and Yamanlar are attached to the village.

Parku had 80 Armenians, 11 houses, one church before the Armenian genocide.
