= Muratköy, Solhan =

Village in Bingöl Province, Turkey

Muratköy
- Village
- Location within Turkey
- Coordinates: 38.893°N 40.960°E
- Country: Turkey
- Province: Bingöl
- District: Solhan
- Population (2021): 424
- Time zone: UTC+3 (TRT)

Muratköy (Kurdish: Norik, Armenian: Նորեկ, romanized: Noreg, Nourik) is a village in the Solhan District, Bingöl Province, Turkey. The village is populated by Kurds of the Umeran tribe and had a population of 424 in 2021.

The hamlet of Halkaınar is attached to the village.

Norek (Nurik) had 59 Armenians, 6 houses before the Armenian genocide. Ankag (Enkak), part of today's Murat, had 63 Armenians.
