= Tarhan, Solhan =

Village in Bingöl Province, Turkey

Tarhan
- Village
- Location within Turkey
- Coordinates: 38.802°N 41.079°E
- Country: Turkey
- Province: Bingöl
- District: Solhan
- Population (2021): 248
- Time zone: UTC+3 (TRT)

Tarhan (Kurdish: Badon) is a village in the Solhan District, Bingöl Province, Turkey. The village is populated by Kurds and had a population of 248 in 2021.

The hamlet of Samanlı is attached to the village.
