= Dilektepe, Solhan =

Village in Bingöl Province, Turkey

Dilektepe
- Village
- Location within Turkey
- Coordinates: 38.948°N 40.975°E
- Country: Turkey
- Province: Bingöl
- District: Solhan
- Population (2021): 582
- Time zone: UTC+3 (TRT)

Dilektepe (Kurdish: Serbon) is a village in the Solhan District, Bingöl Province, Turkey. The village is populated by Kurds of the Çolemêrgî tribe and had a population of 582 in 2021.

The hamlet of Yazmalı is attached to the village.
