= Mutluca, Solhan =

Village in Bingöl Province, Turkey

Mutluca
- Village
- Location within Turkey
- Coordinates: 39.035°N 40.876°E
- Country: Turkey
- Province: Bingöl
- District: Solhan
- Population (2021): 191
- Time zone: UTC+3 (TRT)

Mutluca (Kurdish: Melekan) is a village in the Solhan District, Bingöl Province, Turkey. The village is populated by Kurds of the Çarekan tribe and had a population of 191 in 2021.

The hamlets of Beşevler, Gözübüyük and Yayıklı are attached to the village.
