= Yenibaşak, Solhan =

Village in Bingöl Province, Turkey

Yenibaşak
- Village
- Location within Turkey
- Coordinates: 38.812°N 40.998°E
- Country: Turkey
- Province: Bingöl
- District: Solhan
- Population (2021): 632
- Time zone: UTC+3 (TRT)

Yenibaşak (Kurdish: Arduşen) is a village in the Solhan District, Bingöl Province, Turkey. The village is populated by Kurds and had a population of 632 in 2021.

The hamlet of Duygulu is attached to the village.
