= Bozkanat, Solhan =

Village in Bingöl Province, Turkey

Bozkanat
- Village
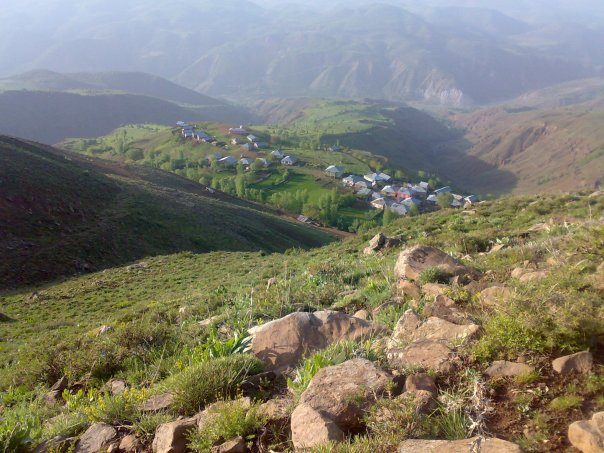

- Location within Turkey
- Coordinates: 38.862°N 40.882°E
- Country: Turkey
- Province: Bingöl
- District: Solhan
- Population (2021): 342
- Time zone: UTC+3 (TRT)

Bozkanat (Kurdish: Duerni) is a village in the Solhan District, Bingöl Province, Turkey. The village is populated by Kurds and had a population of 342 in 2021.

The hamlets of Ortaca, Topluca and Uyanık attached to the village.
