= Gelintepe, Solhan =

Village in Bingöl Province, Turkey

Gelintepe
- Village
- Location within Turkey
- Coordinates: 38.847°N 40.921°E
- Country: Turkey
- Province: Bingöl
- District: Solhan
- Population (2021): 245
- Time zone: UTC+3 (TRT)

Gelintepe (Kurdish: Kexmût, Armenian: Քխմուտ, romanized: Kekhmoud, Kehmut, Kekhmout, Kakhmout) is a village in the Solhan District, Bingöl Province, Turkey. The village is populated by Kurds and had a population of 245 in 2021.

Kekhmud (Kakmut) had 17 Armenians, 2 houses, and one church before the Armenian genocide.
