= Sülünkaş, Solhan =

Village in Bingöl Province, Turkey

Sülünkaş
- Village
- Location within Turkey
- Coordinates: 38.815°N 40.946°E
- Country: Turkey
- Province: Bingöl
- District: Solhan
- Population (2021): 258
- Time zone: UTC+3 (TRT)

Sülünkaş (Kurdish: Umeron) is a village in the Solhan District, Bingöl Province, Turkey. The village is populated by Kurds of the Umeran tribe and had a population of 258 in 2021.

The hamlets of Akyürek, Bedir, Düz, Kümbet, Oluklu and Ömerler are attached to the village.
