= Elbaşı, Solhan =

Village in Bingöl Province, Turkey

Elbaşı
- Village
- Location within Turkey
- Coordinates: 38.987°N 41.044°E
- Country: Turkey
- Province: Bingöl
- District: Solhan
- Population (2021): 209
- Time zone: UTC+3 (TRT)

Elbaşı (Kurdish: Qasiman) is a village in the Solhan District, Bingöl Province, Turkey. The village is populated by Kurds and had a population of 209 in 2021.
