= Solhan District =

District of Bingöl Province, Turkey

Coordinates: 38°54′N 41°00′E

- District
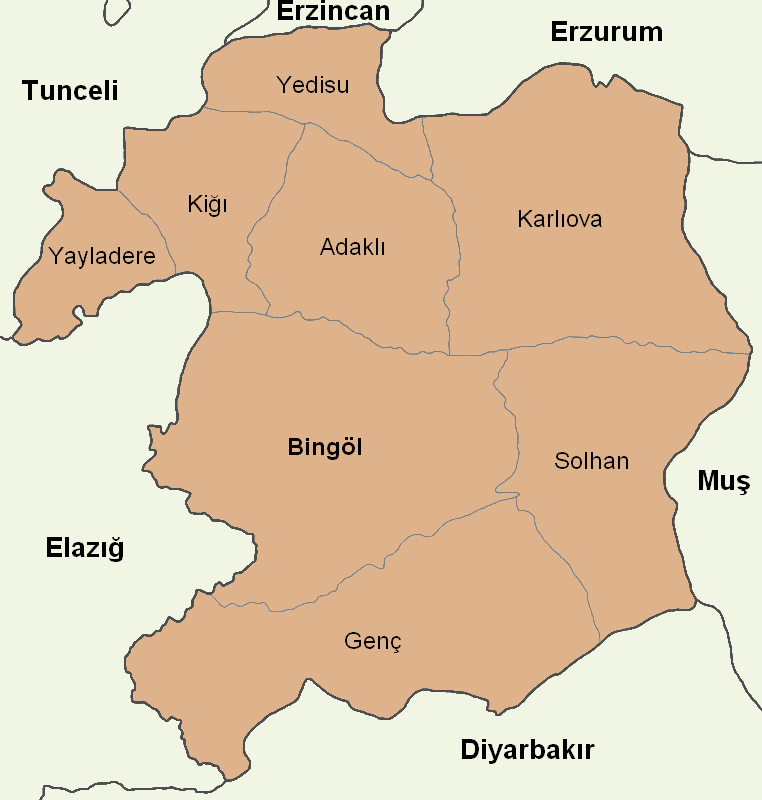
- Map showing Solhan District in Bingöl Province
- Country: Turkey
- Province: Bingöl
- Seat: Solhan
- Population (2021): 33,973
- Time zone: UTC+3 (TRT)
- Website: www.solhan.gov.tr

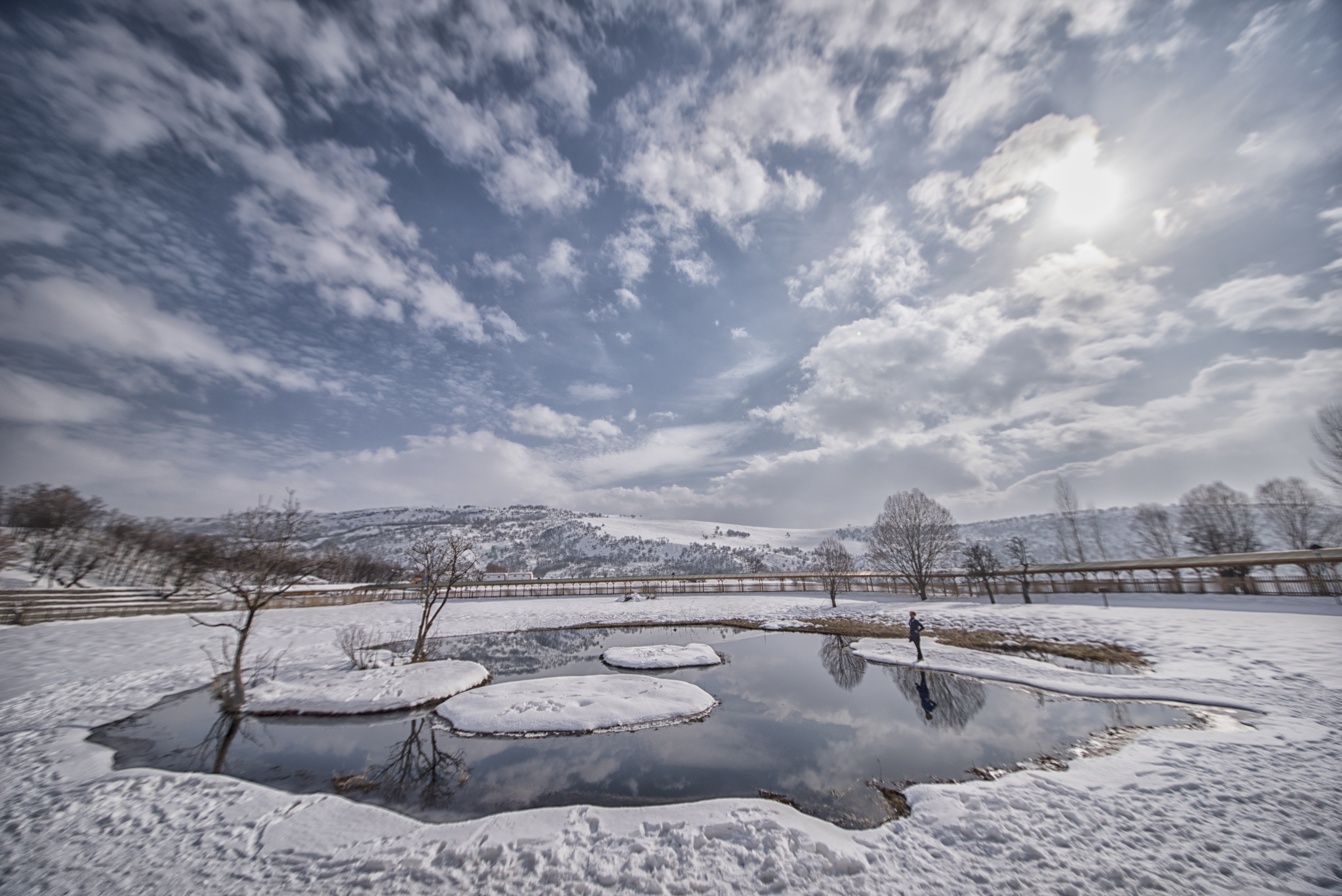
Floating Islands, Solhan

Solhan District is a district of Bingöl Province in Turkey. The town of Solhan is the seat and the district had a population of 33,973 in 2021.

The district was established in 1932.

== Geology and geomorphology ==
One of the most important mountains in Solhan district is Şerafettin Mountains. The high points of the Şerafettin Mountains, which completely cover the north of the district, are Esen Tepe with a height of 2388 meters and Şahin Tepe at an altitude of 2675 meters.

== Composition ==
Beside the town of Solhan, the district encompasses the municipality of Arakonak, twenty-seven villages and eighty hamlets.

=== Villages ===
1. Arslanbeyli
2. Asmakaya
3. Bozkanat
4. Demirkapı
5. Dilektepe
6. Doğuyeli
7. Düzağaç
8. Elbaşı
9. Elmasırtı
10. Eşmetaş
11. Gelintepe
12. Gençtavus
13. Göksu
14. Hazarşah
15. İnandık
16. Kaleköy
17. Kırık
18. Muratköy
19. Mutluca
20. Oymapınar
21. Sükyan
22. Sülünkaş
23. Şimşirpınar
24. Tarhan
25. Yenibaşak
26. Yenidal
27. Yiğitharmanı
