= Elmasırtı, Solhan =

Village in Bingöl Province, Turkey

Elmasırtı
- Village
- Location within Turkey
- Coordinates: 38.853°N 41.046°E
- Country: Turkey
- Province: Bingöl
- District: Solhan
- Population (2021): 441
- Time zone: UTC+3 (TRT)

Elmasırtı (Kurdish: Puexi, Armenian: Բողի, romanized: Poghi, Pohik, Boghe, Bor) is a village in the Solhan District, Bingöl Province, Turkey. The village is populated by Kurds and had a population of 441 in 2021.

The hamlets of Güzeldere, Kayabağ, Sedat and Üzengili are attached to the village.

Bor had 42 Armenians, 47 houses, and one church before the Armenian genocide.
