= Kaleköy, Solhan =

Village in Bingöl Province, Turkey

Kaleköy
- Village
- Location within Turkey
- Coordinates: 38.794°N 41.050°E
- Country: Turkey
- Province: Bingöl
- District: Solhan
- Population (2021): 382
- Time zone: UTC+3 (TRT)

Kaleköy (Kurdish: Gînc) is a village in the Solhan District, Bingöl Province, Turkey. The village is populated by Kurds and had a population of 382 in 2021.

The hamlet of Duraklı is attached to the village.
