= Gençtavus, Solhan =

Village in Bingöl Province, Turkey

Gençtavus
- Village
- Location within Turkey
- Coordinates: 38.788°N 41.000°E
- Country: Turkey
- Province: Bingöl
- District: Solhan
- Population (2021): 399
- Time zone: UTC+3 (TRT)

Gençtavus (Kurdish: Mezrê Gor) is a village in the Solhan District, Bingöl Province, Turkey. The village is populated by Kurds of the Tavz tribe and had a population of 399 in 2021.

The hamlets of Abaklı, Akbük, Alaca, Armuş, Bardaklı, Beşikli, Çalı, Değirmenderesi, Kuştepe, Küllüce, Örencik, Taş, Ünlüce and Yuva are attached to the village.
