= İnandık, Solhan =

Village in Bingöl Province, Turkey

İnandık
- Village
- Location within Turkey
- Coordinates: 38.744°N 41.141°E
- Country: Turkey
- Province: Bingöl
- District: Solhan
- Population (2021): 96
- Time zone: UTC+3 (TRT)

İnandık (Kurdish: Hovît) is a village in the Solhan District, Bingöl Province, Turkey. The village is populated by Kurds and had a population of 96 in 2021.

The hamlet of Cemal is attached to the village.
