= Arslanbeyli, Solhan =

Village in Bingöl Province, Turkey

Arslanbeyli
- Village
- Location within Turkey
- Coordinates: 38.749°N 41.098°E
- Country: Turkey
- Province: Bingöl
- District: Solhan
- Population (2021): 235
- Time zone: UTC+3 (TRT)

Arslanbeyli (Kurdish: Qemeran, Armenian: Kamaran, Ghamara, Khumaran, Gameran) is a village in the Solhan District, Bingöl Province, Turkey. The village is populated by Kurds and had a population of 235 in 2021.

Before the Armenian genocide, Kamara (Kamaran, Gamern) had 56 Armenians, 8 houses, one church.
