= Göksu, Solhan =

Village in Bingöl Province, Turkey

Göksu
- Village
- Location within Turkey
- Coordinates: 39.007°N 41.080°E
- Country: Turkey
- Province: Bingöl
- District: Solhan
- Population (2021): 86
- Time zone: UTC+3 (TRT)

Göksu (Kurdish: Mezrê Şadon) is a village in the Solhan District, Bingöl Province, Turkey. The village is populated by Kurds and had a population of 86 in 2021.
