= Demirkapı, Solhan =

Village in Bingöl Province, Turkey

Demirkapı
- Village
- Location in Turkey
- Coordinates: 38.849°N 40.991°E
- Country: Turkey
- Province: Bingöl
- District: Solhan
- Population (2021): 311
- Time zone: UTC+3 (TRT)

Demirkapı (Kurdish: Xorçîjon) is a village in the Solhan District, Bingöl Province, Turkey. The village is populated by Kurds and had a population of 311 in 2021.
