= Kırık, Solhan =

Village in Bingöl Province, Turkey

Kırık
- Village
- Location within Turkey
- Coordinates: 38.822°N 41.063°E
- Country: Turkey
- Province: Bingöl
- District: Solhan
- Population (2021): 331
- Time zone: UTC+3 (TRT)

Kırık (Kurdish: Qirik) is a village in the Solhan District, Bingöl Province, Turkey. The village is populated by Kurds and had a population of 331 in 2021.

The hamlets of Otluca, Üçdam, Yukarı Otluca and Yürekli are attached to the village.
