= Thinopyrum acutum =

Scientific classification
- Kingdom: Plantae
- Clade: Tracheophytes
- Clade: Angiosperms
- Clade: Monocots
- Clade: Commelinids
- Order: Poales
- Family: Poaceae
- Subfamily: Pooideae
- Genus: Thinopyrum
- Species: T. acutum

Binomial name
- Thinopyrum acutum (DC.) Banfi

Synonyms
- Agropyron acutum (DC.) Roem. & Schult.; Agropyron junceum subsp. acutum (DC.) Malag.; Agropyron pungens var. acutum (DC.) Dumort.; Braconotia acuta (DC.) Godr.; Elymus acutus (DC.) M.-A.Thiébaud; Elytrigia acuta (DC.) Tzvelev; Triticum acutum DC.

Species of plant

Thinopyrum acutum, the sea couch, is a species of perennial grass in the family Poaceae (true grasses). They have a self-supporting growth form and simple, broad leaves. Individuals can grow to 65 cm tall. The species is invasive to the Mont-Saint-Michel Bay and has altered the area's ecology.

== Sources ==
This article incorporates text from a free content work. Licensed under CC0 (license statement/permission). Text taken from Elytrigia atherica. Encyclopedia of Life.
