= Hazarşah, Solhan =

Village in Bingöl Province, Turkey

Hazarşah
- Village
- Location within Turkey
- Coordinates: 39°00′26″N 40°53′19″E
- Country: Turkey
- Province: Bingöl
- District: Solhan
- Population (2021): 1,652
- Time zone: UTC+3 (TRT)

Hazarşah (Kurdish: Hezarşa) is a village in the Solhan District, Bingöl Province, Turkey. The village is populated by Kurds of the Az tribe and had a population of 1,652 in 2021.

The hamlets of Aksakal and Erdemler are attached to the village.
