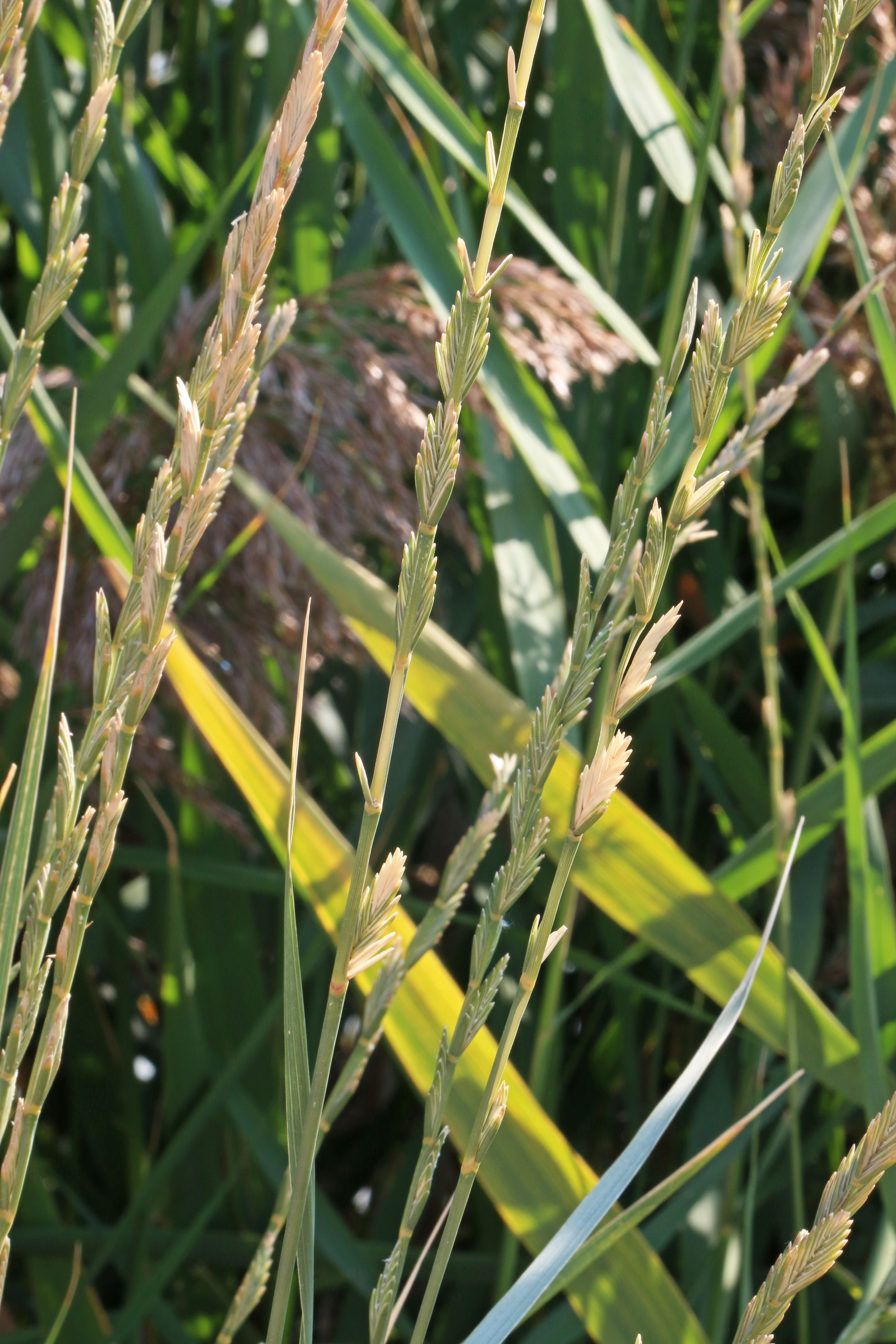

Scientific classification
- Kingdom: Plantae
- Clade: Tracheophytes
- Clade: Angiosperms
- Clade: Monocots
- Clade: Commelinids
- Order: Poales
- Family: Poaceae
- Subfamily: Pooideae
- Genus: Thinopyrum
- Species: T. obtusiflorum

Binomial name
- Thinopyrum obtusiflorum (DC.) Banfi

Synonyms
- List: Agropyron junceum subsp. obtusiflorum (DC.) K.Richt.; Agropyron littorale var. obtusiflorum (DC.) Dumort.; Agropyron obtusiflorum (DC.) Roem. & Schult.; Elymus obtusiflorus (DC.) Conert; Elytrigia obtusiflora (DC.) Tzvelev; Triticum obtusiflorum DC.; Agropyron elongatum subsp. ponticum (Podp.) Senghas; Elymus elongatus subsp. ponticus (Podp.) Melderis; Elymus elongatus var. ponticus (Podp.) Dorn; Elymus ponticus (Podp.) N.Snow; Elytrigia elongata subsp. pontica (Podp.) Gamisans, J.Gamisans & D.Jeanmonod; Elytrigia pontica (Podp.) Holub; Lophopyrum ponticum (Podp.) Á.Löve; Thinopyrum ponticum (Podp.) Barkworth & D.R.Dewey; Triticum ponticum Podp.

= Thinopyrum obtusiflorum =

Species of grass

Thinopyrum obtusiflorum is a species of grass known by the common names tall wheatgrass, rush wheatgrass, and Eurasian quackgrass. It is native to Eurasia and it has been introduced to many other parts of the world, including much of the Americas and Australia.

This perennial bunchgrass can grow up to 2 meters tall. The ribbed leaves have pale green blades a few millimeters wide. The inflorescence is a spike studded with spikelets up to 3 centimeters long, each containing up to 12 flowers.

This grass is used as a forage and for hay in many places. It is good for land with saline soils, and it can help reduce the salinity. It is also good for non-saline soils. This grass is commonly crossed with its relative, wheat, in order to give the wheat traits such as stress tolerance and pest resistance.

== Head blight resistance ==
Thinopyrum obtusiflorum is resistant to Fusarium head blight, which is caused by Fusarium graminearum. This is due, in part, to the Fhb7 gene. The protein product of the Fhb7 gene detoxifies trichothecenes produced by the fungus, which harm both the plant and any mammals that consume them. Evidence suggests that the Fhb7 gene was acquired from an Epichloë fungus by horizontal gene transfer. The Fhb7 gene has been introgressed into wheat.
