= Solhan, Bingöl =

Municipality in Bingöl Province, Turkey

Solhan
- Municipality
- Location in Turkey
- Coordinates: 38°58′05″N 41°03′13″E
- Country: Turkey
- Province: Bingöl
- District: Solhan

Government
  - Mayor: Abdulhakim Yıldız (AKP)
- Population (2021): 20,217
- Time zone: UTC+3 (TRT)
- Website: www.solhan.bel.tr

Solhan (Kurdish: Bongilan, Zazaki: Bongilan, Armenian: Բոգլան, romanized: Boglan, Poklan, Boghlan, Buglan) is a town (belde) and seat of the Solhan District of Bingöl Province in Turkey. The mayor is Abdulhakim Yıldız (AK Party).

Poklan (Boglan) had 77 Armenians, 8 houses, one church (St. Sargis) before the Armenian genocide.

The town had a population of 20,217 in 2021. It is divided into the neighborhoods of Boğlan, Halimepınar, Yenimahalle and Yeşilova.

== Climate ==
Solhan has a dry-summer humid continental climate (Köppen: Dsa), with hot, dry summers, and cold, snowy winters.

Climate data for Solhan (1991–2020)
Month	Jan	Feb	Mar	Apr	May	Jun	Jul	Aug	Sep	Oct	Nov	Dec	Year
Mean daily maximum °C (°F)	0.1 (32.2)	1.7 (35.1)	7.6 (45.7)	14.9 (58.8)	21.2 (70.2)	27.6 (81.7)	32.8 (91.0)	33.4 (92.1)	28.3 (82.9)	20.6 (69.1)	11.2 (52.2)	3.4 (38.1)	17.0 (62.6)
Daily mean °C (°F)	−4.5 (23.9)	−3.1 (26.4)	2.7 (36.9)	9.5 (49.1)	14.8 (58.6)	20.6 (69.1)	25.2 (77.4)	25.3 (77.5)	20.1 (68.2)	13.5 (56.3)	5.5 (41.9)	−1.1 (30.0)	10.8 (51.4)
Mean daily minimum °C (°F)	−8.1 (17.4)	−7.0 (19.4)	−1.3 (29.7)	4.4 (39.9)	8.6 (47.5)	13.0 (55.4)	17.0 (62.6)	16.8 (62.2)	12.1 (53.8)	7.1 (44.8)	0.8 (33.4)	−4.5 (23.9)	5.0 (41.0)
Average precipitation mm (inches)	61.89 (2.44)	79.12 (3.11)	95.86 (3.77)	101.6 (4.00)	73.13 (2.88)	23.27 (0.92)	8.75 (0.34)	3.76 (0.15)	11.59 (0.46)	61.23 (2.41)	62.64 (2.47)	71.34 (2.81)	654.18 (25.76)
Average precipitation days (≥ 1.0 mm)	8.3	9.5	11.2	12.1	10.1	4.2	2.3	1.6	2.3	7.1	7.1	9	84.8
Average relative humidity (%)	76.4	74.9	68.9	62.2	58.7	46.8	39.7	38.8	42.9	56.6	65.8	75.5	58.7
Mean monthly sunshine hours	102.7	119.9	153.9	182.7	244.8	318.2	346.7	324.9	277.6	206.5	146.2	97.8	2,507.5
Source: NOAA
