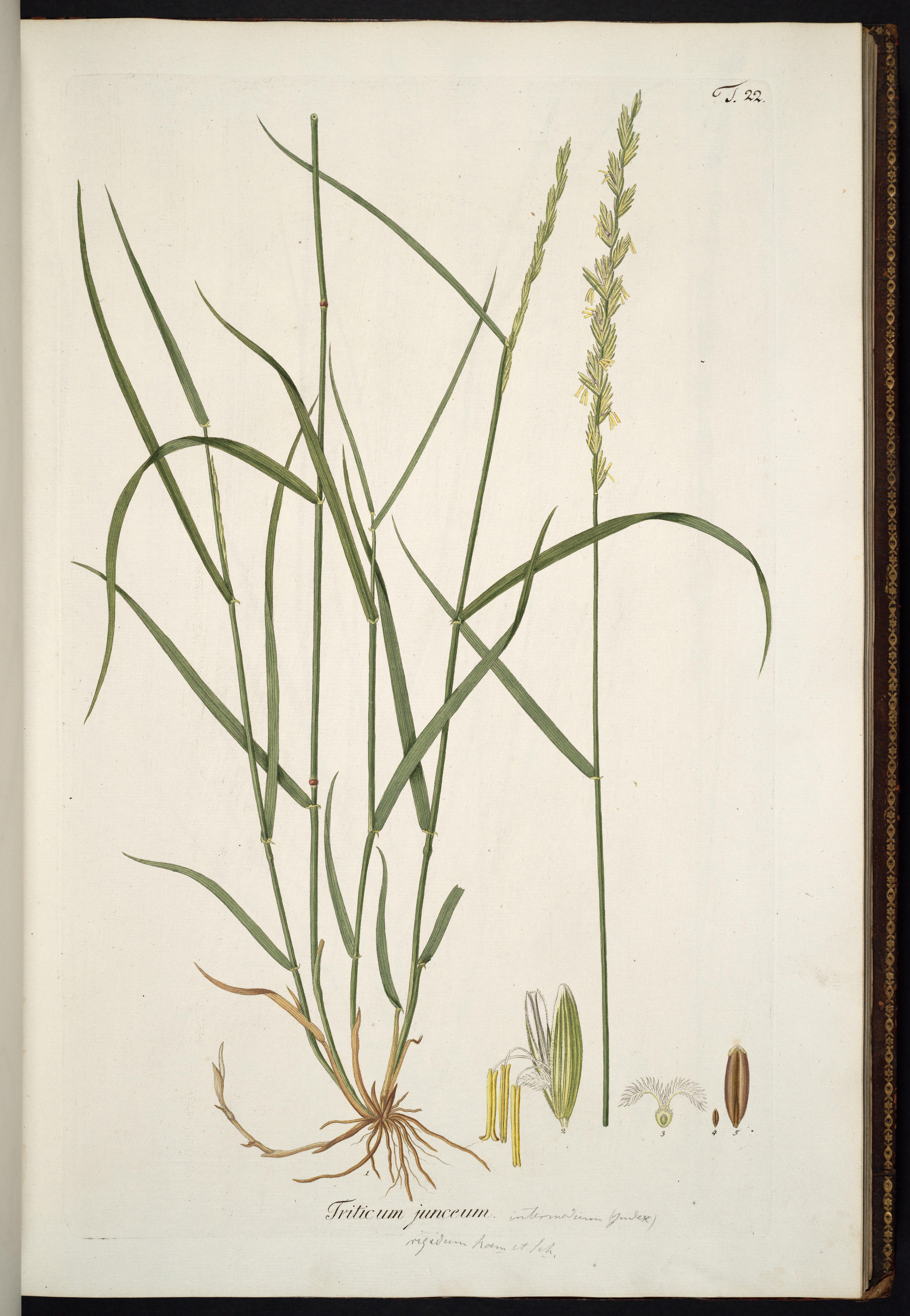

Scientific classification
- Kingdom: Plantae
- Clade: Tracheophytes
- Clade: Angiosperms
- Clade: Monocots
- Clade: Commelinids
- Order: Poales
- Family: Poaceae
- Subfamily: Pooideae
- Genus: Thinopyrum
- Species: T. junceum

Binomial name
- Thinopyrum junceum (L.) Á.Löve

Synonyms
- List: Agropyron farctum (Viv.) Rothm.; Agropyron farctum Boiss.; Agropyron junceum (L.) P.Beauv. 1812; Agropyron junceum subsp. mediterraneum Simonet; Agropyron junceum var. sartorii Boiss. & Heldr.; Agropyron lepturoides Lojac.; Agropyron repens subsp. junceum (L.) Bonnier & Layens; Agropyron sartorii (Boiss. & Heldr.) Grecescu; Braconotia juncea (L.) Godr.; Bromus truncatus Scop.; Elymus farctus (Viv.) Runemark ex Melderis; Elymus farctus var. sartorii (Boiss. & Heldr.) Melderis; Elymus farctus var. striatulus (Runemark) Melderis; Elymus multinodus Gould; Elymus striatulus Runemark; Elytrigia farcta (Viv.) Holub; Elytrigia juncea (L.) Nevski; Elytrigia juncea subsp. mediterranea (Simonet) Hyl.; Elytrigia mediterranea (Simonet) Prokudin; Elytrigia sartorii (Boiss. & Heldr.) Holub; Elytrigia striatula (Runemark) Holub; Festuca juncea (L.) Moench; Frumentum junceum (L.) E.H.L.Krause; Lolium lepturoides Lojac.; Lolium subulatum Degen ex Lojac.; Thinopyrum junceum subsp. mediterraneum (Simonet) Á.Löve; Thinopyrum runemarkii Á.Löve; Thinopyrum sartorii (Boiss. & Heldr.) Á.Löve; Triticum farctum Viv.; Triticum glaucum Link; Triticum junceum L. 1771; Triticum junceum subsp. sartorii (Boiss. & Heldr.) Nyman; Triticum litoreum Brot.

= Thinopyrum junceum =

Species of grass

Thinopyrum junceum, commonly named sand couch-grass, is a species of grass in the family Poaceae. It is found in Europe and temperate Asia, and grows from rhizomes. They have a self-supporting growth form and simple, broad leaves. Individuals can grow to 52 cm tall.

A relative of wheat, Thinopyrum junceum is salt-tolerant. A hybridization of the two creates a salt-tolerant wheat variety.
