= Demirtaş =

Demirtaş (lit. "iron rock") is a Turkish name and may refer to:

== People ==
- Aksel Gürcan Demirtaş (born 1973), Turkish female sprinter
- Azat Demirtaş (born 2002), Turkish long-distance runner,
- Başak Demirtaş (born 1977), Kurdish-Turkish teacher and author
- Christian Demirtas (born 1984), German footballer
- Kahraman Demirtaş (born 1994), Turkish footballer
- Mehmet Ali Demirtaş (born 1951), Turkish wrestler
- Nurettin Demirtaş (born 1972), Turkish politician
- Onur Demirtaş (born 1982), Turkish footballer
- Özgür Demirtaş (born 1975), Turkish economist and academic
- Selahattin Demirtaş (born 1973), Kurdish–Turkish politician
- Soner Demirtaş (born 1991), Turkish freestyle sport wrestler
- Taha Cengiz Demirtaş (born 1994), Turkish footballer

== Places in Turkey ==
=== Villages ===
- Demirtaş, Alanya, Antalya Province
- Demirtaş, Dikili, İzmir Province
- Demirtaş, Gerger, Adıyaman Province
- Demirtaş, Hakkâri, Hakkâri Province
- Demirtaş, İmranlı, Sivas Province
- Demirtaş, Kalecik, Ankara Province
- Demirtaş, Karakoçan, Elazığ Province
- Demirtaş, Kiğı, or Demirdöş, Bingöl Province
- Demirtaş, Oltu, Erzurum Province
- Demirtaş, Yumurtalık, Adana Province

=== Other places ===
- Demirtaş, Uzunköprü, a neighborhood of Uzunköprü, Edirne Province
- Demirtaş Dam, Bursa Province

== See also ==
- Timurtash (died 1328), Chobanid Mongol khan
