= Iraqi Koine =

Koine dialect of Assyrian Neo-Aramaic

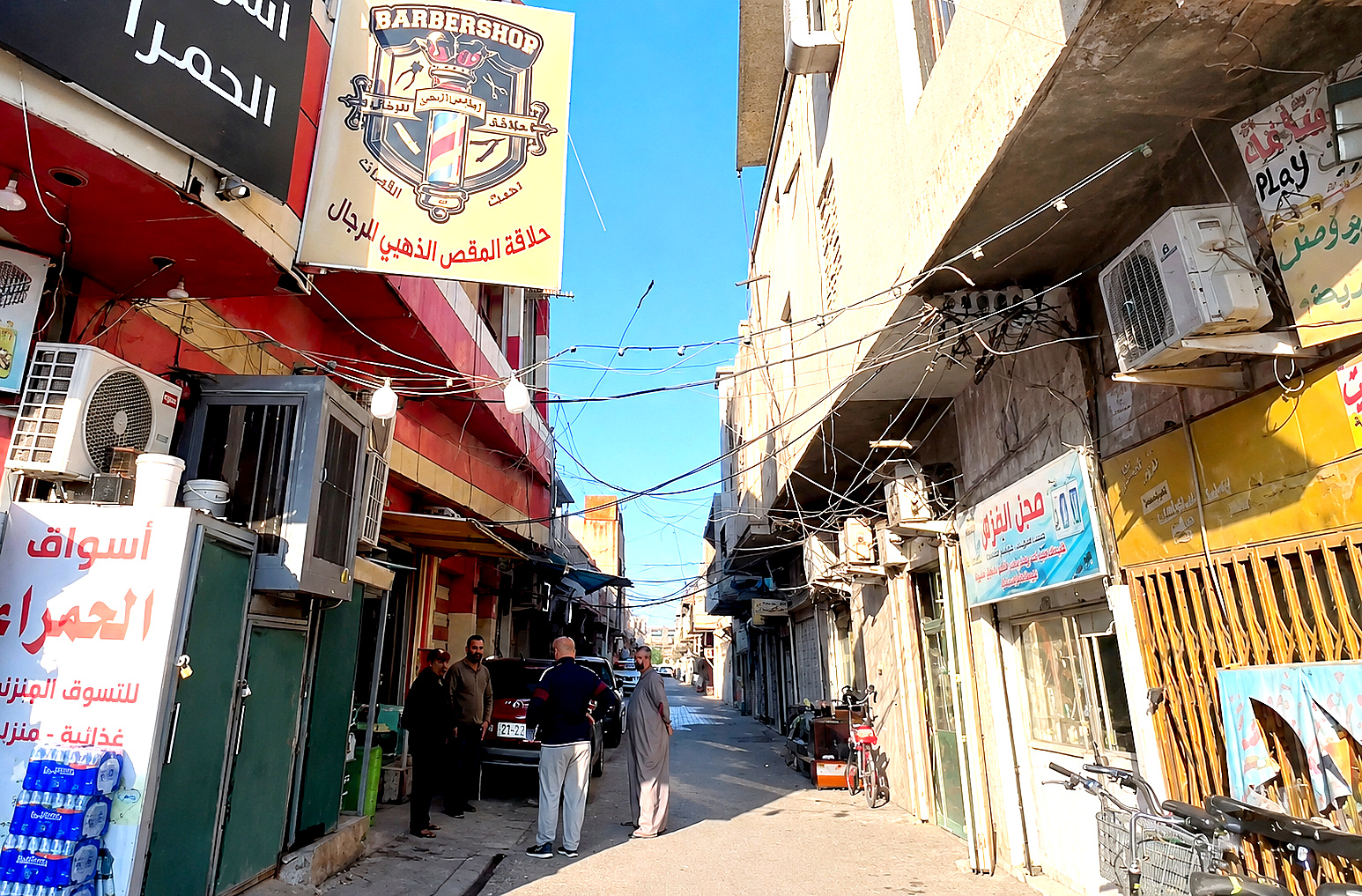
Garage al-Amana in Baghdad, one of the urban Assyrian communities associated with the spread of Iraqi Koine during the 20th century

Iraqi Koine, also known as Iraqi Urmian Koine, Assyrian Koine, and Standard Assyrian, is a koineised dialect of Assyrian Neo-Aramaic that emerged through the convergence of the rural Ashiret dialects of Hakkari in present-day Turkey and the formerly prestigious dialect of Urmia, Iran. It developed into a widely understood supra-regional variety among Iraqi Assyrians and served as a common means of communication between speakers of different dialect backgrounds.

Iraqi Koine does not really constitute a new dialect, but an incomplete merger of dialects, with some speakers sounding more Urmian, such as those from Habbaniyah, and others more Hakkarian, such as those who immigrated from northern Iraq. As an English accent analogue, the difference between Iraqi Koine and the Urmia dialect has been compared to that between Australian English and New Zealand English, or between Received Pronunciation and Standard Southern British. Iraqi Koine shares many features with the Urmia dialect, reflecting its origins in the standard written language, which was largely based on Urmian.

== History and development ==
Scholars describe the process as one of dialect levelling, dialect mixing, and koineisation, whereby distinctive local features were reduced and a more broadly shared speech form emerged. Speakers of numerous mutually intelligible but distinct Neo-Aramaic dialects came into close contact in refugee settlements, schools, churches, military units, and urban centres. After their displacement following the Simele massacre of 1933, many Assyrians were resettled along the Khabur River according to tribal affiliation. This pattern of settlement helped preserve traditional dialects by maintaining tribal cohesion and limiting contact between speakers of different varieties. As a result, no common koine emerged in these rural settlements. Following their temporary residence in Baqubah, many Assyrians moved to northern Iraq. Some settled in villages, while others joined the Assyrian Levies at Habbaniyah or found employment in various urban centres. As increasing numbers of Assyrians migrated to cities during the 1930s, 1940s and 1950s, traditional tribal structures and village-based social networks gradually weakened. By the mid-1950s, a large proportion of the Assyrian population lived in Baghdad, Kirkuk, Basra, Mosul, and Habbaniyah, bringing speakers of numerous dialects into close and sustained contact.

This geographic relocation significantly reduced dialectal isolation and encouraged linguistic convergence. At the same time, Assyrians placed considerable emphasis on preserving their language as a marker of ethnic identity. The standard written language was taught through churches, private schools, tutors, and family networks, and by the end of the 1950s many Assyrians had acquired literacy in it. As familiarity with the standard language increased and speakers of different dialects became more closely integrated in urban settings, a spoken koine began to emerge. Influenced by both the Standard Written Language and a range of regional dialects, it developed into an accepted medium of communication between speakers from different dialect backgrounds. By the end of the 1950s, Iraqi Koine was widely spoken among urban Assyrians and had become a common means of communication across dialect groups. Linguists emphasise that Iraqi Koine is neither identical to the Urmia dialect nor simply a spoken form of the standard written language. Rather, it is a distinct linguistic variety influenced by both, while displaying a number of independent phonological and grammatical developments. Although the emergence of Iraqi Koine promoted greater linguistic uniformity, traditional dialects continued to be spoken, particularly in rural areas and among first-generation migrants who retained their native speech varieties.

The status of Iraqi Koine was further strengthened after the 14 July Revolution of 1958, which accelerated urbanization and expanded educational and employment opportunities. The migration of rural populations into major cities, combined with the disruption caused by the Iraqi–Kurdish conflict, brought large numbers of Assyrians into closer contact with the urban koine. By the late twentieth century, Iraqi Koine had become the predominant means of communication among many urban Assyrians, particularly among second-, third-, and fourth-generation speakers in cities such as Baghdad, Kirkuk, Habbaniyah, and Basra. It also came to serve as the principal dialect used in Assyrian music, formal speech, and other supra-regional forms of communication. From the 1970s onward, large-scale Assyrian emigration carried Iraqi Koine beyond Iraq. The dialect became established in diaspora communities in the United States, Australia, and Europe, where it continued to serve as a common means of communication among speakers of diverse Assyrian dialect backgrounds. Some speakers of traditional Hakkari dialects are able to alternate between their native dialect and Iraqi Koine depending on the linguistic background of their interlocutors. This form of code-switching is especially common among speakers who have acquired both Iraqi Koine and a traditional tribal dialect. Even among some Syrian-Assyrians of Hakkari origin, Iraqi Koine is likewise used in speech and song. This has been attributed to the influence of Assyrian literature, media, and the use of the standard language in the liturgy of the Assyrian Church of the East. Although Iraqi Koine incorporates features from a variety of dialects, elements of the original Ashiret dialects remain observable, particularly in the speech of older speakers.

== Dialectal variation ==
Audio sample of Assyrian singer Juliana Jendo, a native Tyari speaker from Syria, using Iraqi Koine in an interview

Pronunciation among speakers of Iraqi Koine exhibits a range of variations, some of which reflect differences in phonology, while others are associated with morphological features. Examples include the use of /y/ rather than /č/ in the prefix of the general present indicative and the retention of the verbal prefix /m/ in certain augmented verb classes. Although these features are grammatical in origin, they also have a noticeable effect on pronunciation. Such differences are often perceived as regional or dialectal accents, and the degree of divergence varies considerably, with some speakers displaying only minor traces of their native dialects and others retaining more distinctive features. These variations may involve differences in the articulation of consonants and vowels, as well as changes in prosody, including stress, intonation, rhythm, sound substitutions, deletions, additions, metathesis, and shifts in emphasis.

Many of these features are regarded as remnants of older tribal and regional Assyrian dialects that persisted following the emergence of Iraqi Koine. Such traits are not always consistently present and tend to become less noticeable when speakers consciously adopt the koine form, but may remain more apparent in informal settings. Historically, several mountain dialects, including those of Tyari, Jilu, Baz, and Mar Bishu, were often subject to linguistic stigmatization in urban centres where Iraqi Koine predominated. More recently, however, increased access to education and the growth of Assyrian nationalism have contributed to greater acceptance of dialectal diversity among Assyrian speakers. Linguists note that many features associated with particular dialects are not necessarily unique to a single variety, but may be especially characteristic of it.

== Linguistic features ==
Sample of the Iraqi Koine dialect (voice by Linda George). Notice how it combines the phonetic features of the Hakkari (Turkey) and Urmian (Iran) dialects

Iraqi Koine is more closely related to the Urmia dialect than to the traditional Hakkari dialects, reflecting its origins in the Standard Written Language, which was largely based on Urmian. The two varieties share broadly similar consonant systems, consonant cluster formations, and vowel inventories, and are both classified as /t, d/ dialects. Their vowel systems exhibit comparable developments from earlier Aramaic pronunciations, including the emergence of the vowels /e/ and /o/, in contrast to many traditional Ashiret dialects, which retain the diphthongs /ay/ and /aw/. In some cases, these vowels may also be realised as the closer vowels /i/ and /u/. Despite these similarities, the Urmia dialect exhibits a stronger tendency toward palatalization and shows greater influence from the Persian language, particularly in the fronting of front vowels and the rounding of back vowels. Iraqi Koine generally lacks these more pronounced Persian-influenced features.

Linguists have noted that the Urmia dialect generally exhibits a weaker degree of emphasis than Iraqi Koine. This tendency has been attributed to the historical influence of the Persian language, which lacks emphatic consonants as a phonemic feature. By contrast, Iraqi Koine does not display the same degree of de-emphasisation, a characteristic that has been associated with prolonged contact with Arabic, a language in which emphatic consonants play a prominent phonological role. Another difference between Iraqi Koine and the Urmia dialect is the treatment of geminated consonants. Iraqi Koine generally preserves medial consonant gemination, whereas the Urmia dialect often simplifies double consonants to a single consonant.

Examples of consonant gemination in Iraqi Koine and the Urmia dialect
Meaning	Iraqi Koine	Urmia dialect
Heart	libba	liba
Bear	dibba	diba
Years	šənne	šəne
Poison	samma	sama

The two varieties possess broadly similar consonant and vowel systems and share several sound changes that distinguish them from many traditional Ashiret dialects. Despite these similarities, Iraqi Koine differs from the Urmia dialect in several respects. Iraqi Koine exhibits less extensive palatalization, while the Urmia dialect shows a stronger tendency for consonants and vowels to undergo palatal shifts and diphthongisation. In addition, Iraqi Koine generally retains the historical Semitic pronunciation of the consonant /q/, whereas in the Urmia dialect it may be realised as /k/ in some environments.

Examples of diphthongisation in the Urmia dialect
Meaning	Iraqi Koine	Urmia dialect
City	mdi:ta	mdiyta
Feast	ʾi:da	ʾiyda
Fish	nu:na	nuyna
Money	zu:zeh	zuyzeh

Iraqi Koine exhibits a lower degree of palatalization than the Urmia dialect. In Urmian, certain palatal consonants tend to shift toward palato-alveolar and alveolar affricates, resulting in distinct pronunciations of a number of words. Palatalization resulting in the marginal occurrence of the velar consonants /k/ and /g/ is also found in other Northeastern Neo-Aramaic dialects, including Christian Iraqi Koine. However, the stronger degree of palatalization and the associated chain shift within the palato-alveolar series are distinctive features of the Christian dialects of the Urmia region.

Examples of palatalization in the Urmia dialect
Meaning	Iraqi Koine	Urmia dialect
Tooth	ki:ka	čhi:cha
Cake	ke:ka	če:ča
Skin; leather	gilda	jilda
Quick	jaldi	zhaldi

Iraqi Koine and the Urmia dialect both lack the verbal prefix m- in certain augmented verb forms, a feature that is retained in more conservative varieties of Assyrian Neo-Aramaic, including the Tyari and Alqosh dialects. This loss of the prefix is one of several grammatical features shared by Iraqi Koine and Urmian.

Loss of the augmented verbal prefix m-
Meaning	Iraqi Koine / Urmia	Tyari
Send	šadir	mšadir
Finish; save	pariq	m'pariq
Cut	parim	m'parim

=== Phonetics ===
The vowel phonemes of Iraqi Koine

- Iraqi Koine, like the majority of the Suret dialects, realises /w/ as [w] instead of [ʋ].
- Iraqi Koine generally realises the interdental fricatives /θ/ and /ð/ in words such as maṯa ("village") and rqaḏa ("dancing") as the alveolar stops [t] and [d]. In contrast, most Lower Tyari, Barwari, and Chaldean Neo-Aramaic dialects retain the fricative pronunciations [θ] and [ð].
- Dorsal fricatives /x ɣ/ are heard as uvular as [χ ʁ].
- Predominantly, /q/ in words like qalama ("pen") does not merge with /k/.
- The diphthong /aw/ in words like tawra ("bull"), as heard in most of Hakkari dialects, are realised as [o]: tora.
- The [ʊj] diphthong in zuyze ("money") is retained as [u]: zuze.
- Depending on the speaker, the velar stops /k/ and /ɡ/ may be affricated as [t͡ʃ] and [d͡ʒ] respectively.
- The [t͡ʃ] in some present progressive verbs like či'axla ("[she] eats") is retained as [k]: ki'axla.

=== Possessive suffixes ===
Iraqi Koine possessive suffixes
		singular	plural
1st person		betī (my house)	betan (our house)
2nd person	masc.	betux (your house)	betōxun (your house)
2nd person	fem.	betax (your house)	betōxun (your house)
3rd person	masc.	betū (his house)	betéh (their house)
3rd person	fem.	betō (her house)	betéh (their house)

== See also ==
- Koiné language
