= Jelek =

Jelek may refer to:

- Yelek, female vest
- Jelek (son of Árpád)
- jelek, "ugly" in Indonesian
- Jelek, Iraq, a village in Iraq
