= Emine Demir =

Turkish women's football defender

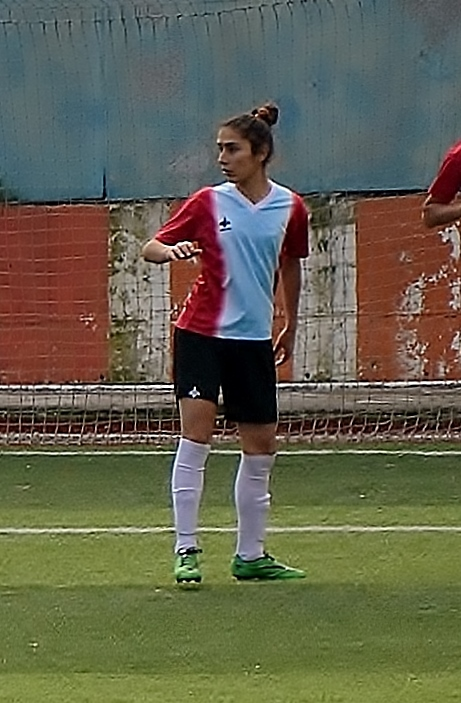
- Emine Demir for Trabzon İdmanocağı (December 2014)

Personal information
- Date of birth: November 11, 1993 (age 32)
- Place of birth: Taşbaşı, Hakkari, Turkey
- Position: Defender

Team information
- Current team: Yüksekova
- Number: 6

Senior career*
Years	Team	Apps	(Gls)
2007–2009	Malatya	8	(0)
2009–2011	Mersin Cam	14	(3)
2011–2012	Adana İdmanyurdu	42	(14)
2012–2016	Trabzon İdmanocağı	71	(6)
2017–2019	Hakkarigücü	40	(21)
2019–2021	Ataşehir	19	(1)
2021–2022	Fatih Vatan	22	(1)
2022	Galatasaray	7	(1)
2022–2023	Fatih Vatan	10	(0)
2023–2024	Hakkarigücü	13	(0)
2024–	Yüksekova	18	(1)

International career^{‡}
2008	Turkey U-17	1	(0)
2011–2012	Turkey U-19	19	(0)
2014	Turkey U-21	1	(0)
2015–2016	Turkey	4	(0)
- * Club domestic league appearances and goals as of 28 September 2025 ‡ National team caps and goals as of 8 April 2016

Emine Demir (born November 11, 1993) is a Turkish women's football defender, who plays in the Women's Super League for Yüksekova with jersey number 6. She was a member of the Turkey girls' U-17, Turkey women's U-19, women's U-21 and Turkey women's teams.

== Early years ==
She was born to Kurdish parents in Taşbaşı village of Hakkari province in southeastern Turkey on November 11, 1993. She began football playing in the regional primary boarding school of the Association for the Support of Contemporary Living. Her first club Malatya Gençlik ve Spor provided her scholarship for education in the Sports High School in Malatya. She supports her family financially.

== Club career ==
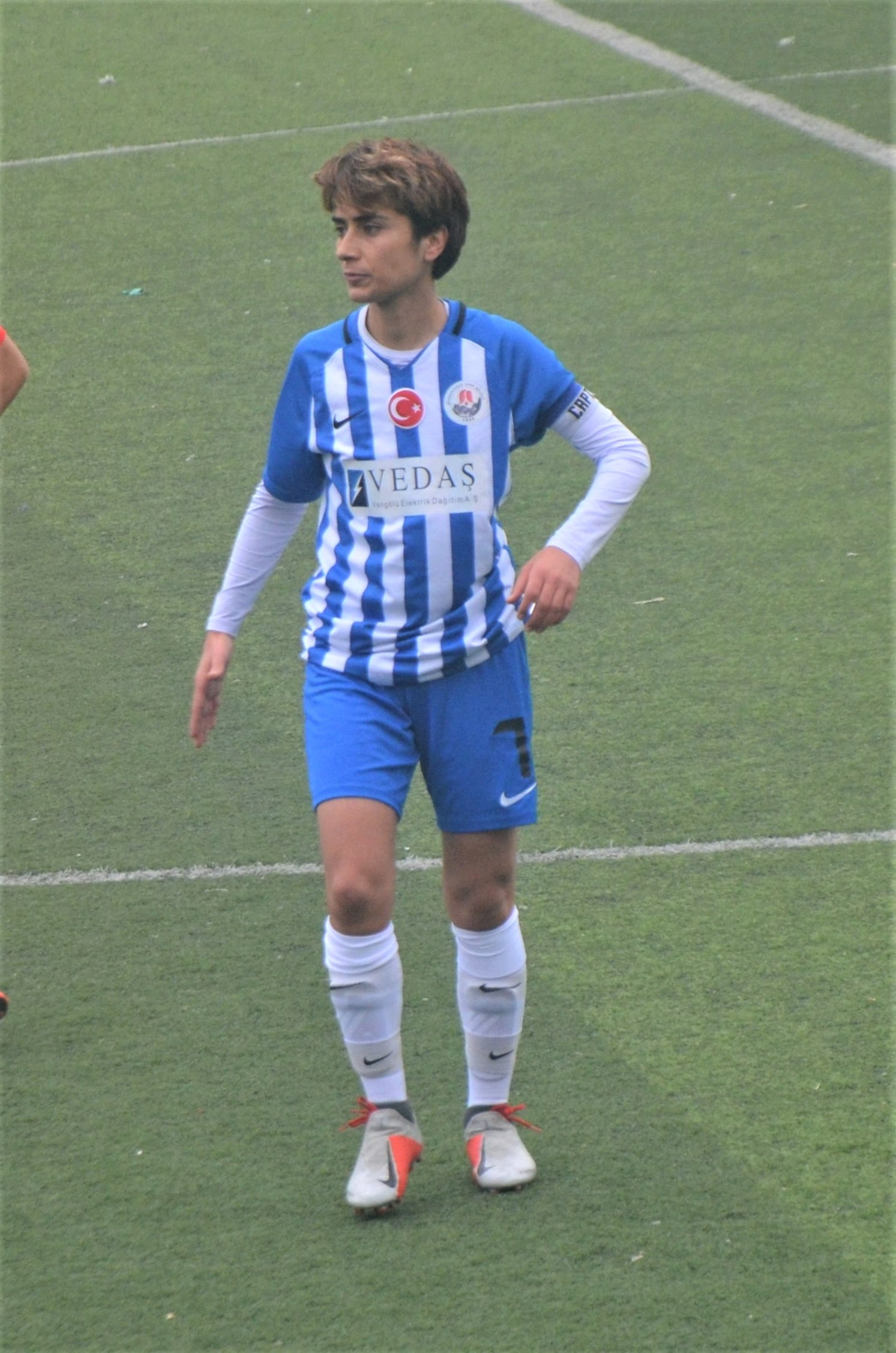
Emine Demir of Hakkarigücü Spor in the 2018–19 First League.

Emine Demir of Hakkarigücü Spor in the 2018–19 Turkish Women's First.

She received her license for Malatya Gençlik ve Spor on November 16, 2007, and played the 2008–09 season in the Turkish Women's Second League. The next season, she moved to Mersin Camspor to play in the Women's First League. In the 2010–11 season, she was transferred by Adana İdmanyurduspor, which was promoted to the Women's First League one season later. Dmir has been part of Trabzon İdmanocağı since 2012. After three full and a half seasons, she moved to Hakkarigücü Spor in her hometown to play in the Women's Second League. She earned her team's promotion to the Women's First league in the 2018–19 season. In October 2019, she transferred to the Istanbul-based club Ataşehir Belediyespor.

=== Galatasaray ===
On 22 August 2022, the Turkish Women's Football Super League team was transferred to the Galatasaray club.

=== Fatih Vatan Spor ===
In the second half of the 2022–23 season, she returned to her former club Fatih Vatan Spor.

== International career ==
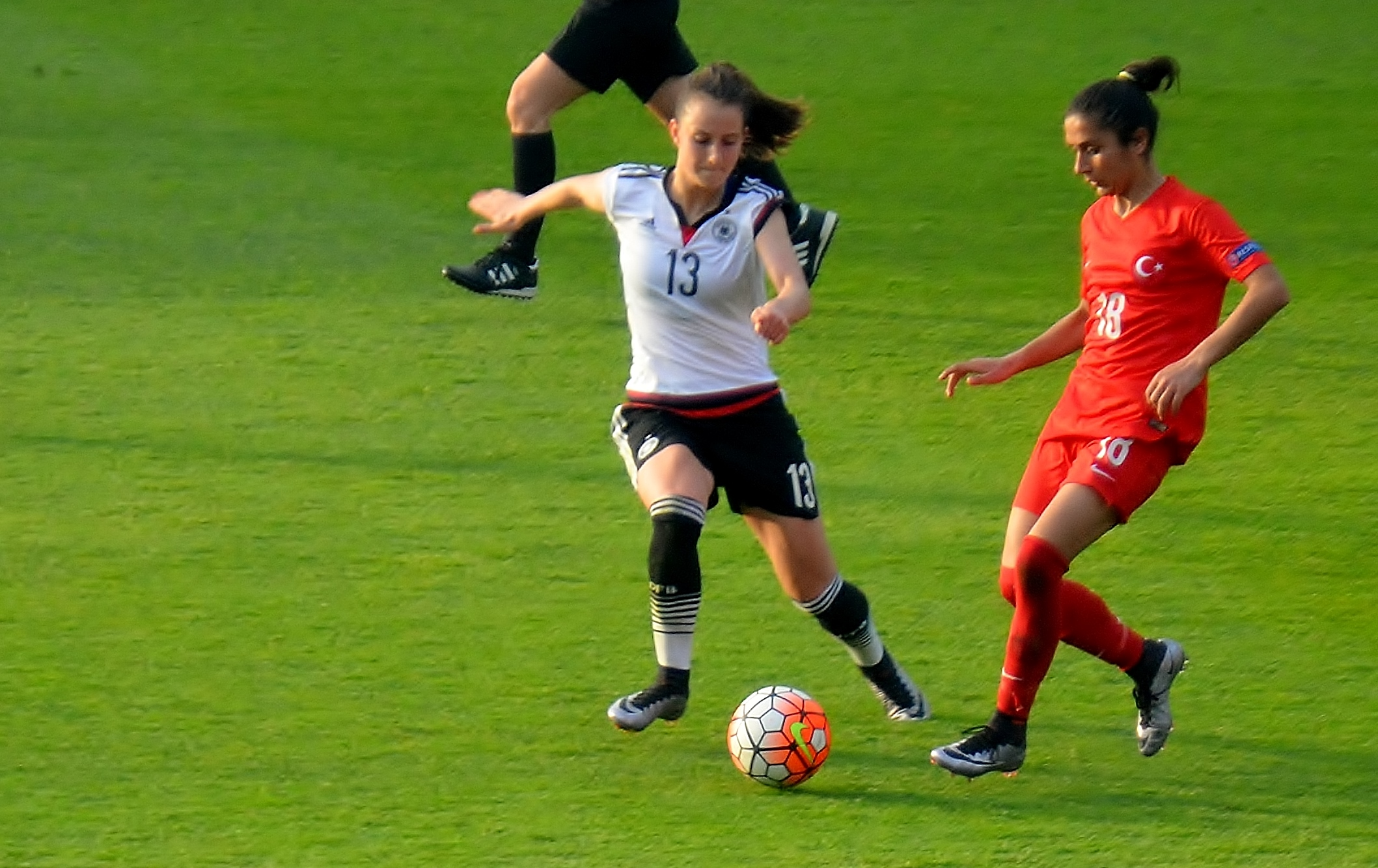
Emine Demir (#18) playing for Turkey national team at the UEFA Women's Euro 2017 qualifying Group 5 match against Germany in Istanbul, Turkey

Emine Demir was admitted to the Turkey girls' U-17 team to play at the 2009 UEFA Women's Under-17 Championship – Group 5 matches. She debuted in the game against Faroe Islands on October 23, 2008.

She Became a member of the Turkey women's U-19 team playing for the first time in the 2011 Kuban Spring Tournament against Ukraine on March 6, 2011. She played at the 2011 UEFA Women's U-19 Championship Second qualifying round – Group 3 and 2012 UEFA Women's Under-19 Championship – Group A matches. She capped in total 19 times for the Turkey women's U-19 team.

On November 26, 2014, she appeared for Turkey women's U-21 team in a friendly match against Belgium.

In February 2015, Emine Demir was called up to the Turkey women's. She was a substitute at the friendly matches against the Georgian women. On August 19, 2015, she debuted in the Turkey women's team appearing in the friendly match against Albania.

== Career statistics ==
As of 28 September 2025.

Club	Season	League			Continental		National		Total	
Club	Season	Division	Apps	Goals	Apps	Goals	Apps	Goals	Apps	Goals
Malatya	2008–09	Second League	8	0	–	–	1	0	9	0
Mersin Cam	2009–10	First League	14	3	–	–	0	0	14	3
Adana İdmanyurdu	2010–11	Second League	23	7	–	–	7	0	30	7
Adana İdmanyurdu	2011–12	First League	19	7	–	–	9	0	28	7
Adana İdmanyurdu	Total		42	14	–	–	16	0	58	14
Trabzon İdmanocağı	2012–13	First League	18	1	–	–	3	0	21	1
Trabzon İdmanocağı	2013–14	First League	12	0	–	–	0	0	12	0
Trabzon İdmanocağı	2014–15	First League	16	1	–	–	1	0	17	1
Trabzon İdmanocağı	2015–16	First League	17	4	–	–	4	0	21	4
Trabzon İdmanocağı	2016–17	First League	8	0	–	–	0	0	8	0
Trabzon İdmanocağı	Total		71	6	–	–	8	0	79	6
Hakkarigücü	2016–17	Second League	7	6	–	–	0	0	7	6
Hakkarigücü	2017–18	Second League	18	14	–	–	0	0	18	14
Hakkarigücü	2018–19	First League	15	1	–	–	0	0	15	1
Hakkarigücü	Total		40	21	–	–	0	0	40	21
Ataşehir	2019–20	First League	15	1	–	–	0	0	15	1
Ataşehir	2020–21	First League	4	0	–	–	0	0	4	0
Ataşehir	Total		19	1	–	–	0	0	19	1
Fatih Vatan	2021–22	Super League	22	1	–	–	0	0	22	1
Galatasaray	2022–23	Super League	7	1	–	–	0	0	7	1
Fatih Vatan	2022–23	Super League	10	0	–	–	0	0	10	0
Hakkarigücü	2023–24	Super League	13	0	–	–	0	0	13	0
Yüksekova	2024–25	First League	17	1	–	–	0	0	17	1
Yüksekova	2025–26	Super League	1	0	–	–	0	0	1	0
Yüksekova	Total		18	1	–	–	0	0	18	1
Career total			246	48	–	–	25	0	271	48

== Honours ==
Turkish Women's First League

Adana İdmanyurduspor
Third place (1): 2010–11

Trabzon İdmanocağı
Third places (2): 2014–15, 2015–16

Turkish Women's Second League

Hakkarigücü Spor
Second places (1): 2017–18
