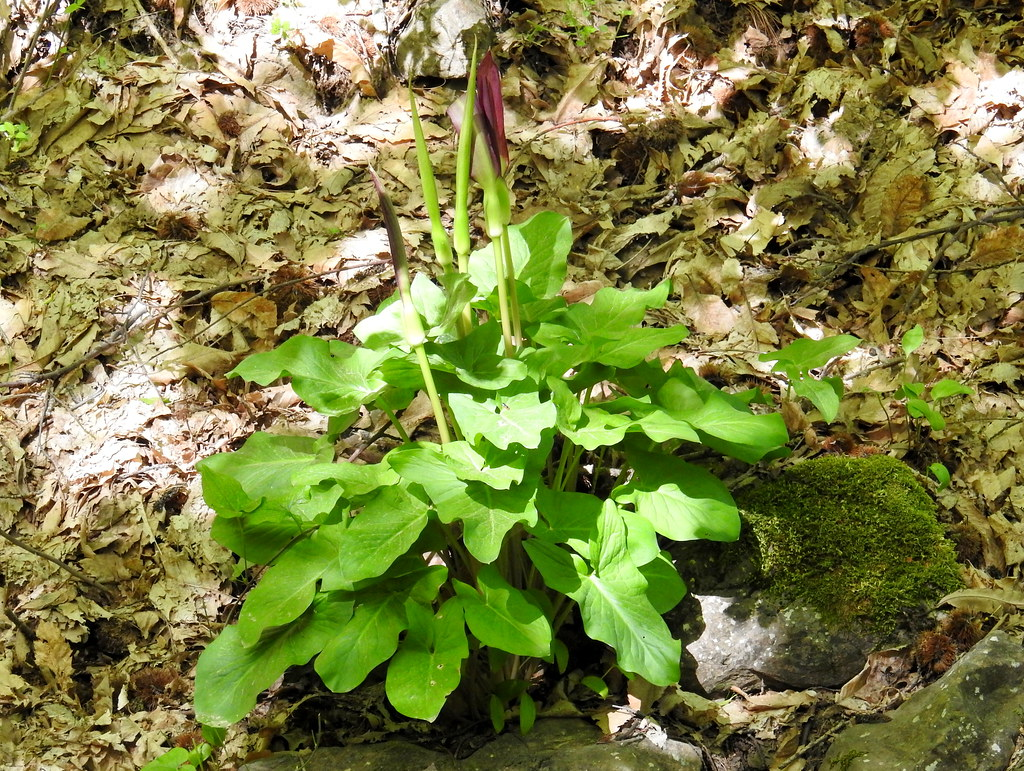

Scientific classification
- Kingdom: Plantae
- Clade: Tracheophytes
- Clade: Angiosperms
- Clade: Monocots
- Order: Alismatales
- Family: Araceae
- Genus: Arum
- Species: A. rupicola

Binomial name
- Arum rupicola Boiss. (1853)
- Range of A. rupicola (precise locations only)

Synonyms
- Arum hygrophilum var. rupicola (Boiss.) Boiss.

= Arum rupicola =

Species of plant

Arum rupicola is a woodland plant species of the family Araceae. It is found on Lesbos, on Cyprus, in Anatolia, the Transcaucasus, the Armenian plateau, the north Levant, the Zagros Mountains, and Kopet Dag.

== Description ==
By relative inflorescence height, Arum species are divided into "cryptic" species, whose inflorescences are borne on a short peduncle amid or below the leaves, and "flag" species, whose inflorescences are above leaf level at the end of long peduncles. A. rupicola is a flag species. The flowers of this species have no perceptible odor to humans. The appendix does produce odors perceptible to its pollinators, using sesquiterpenes, traces of p-cresol, various alcohols, esters and ketones. The floral chamber wall is bicolored: dark purple in its opaque upper part and pale green in its translucent lower part. The male flowers of most Arum species produce heat, mainly during the first evening or night after the spathe has opened. The spadix of A. rupicola maintains a temperature of around 40 °C (104 °F), about 15–20 °C (59–68 °F) above ambient air temperature, from 17:00–23:00 and then begins to fall.

== Ecology ==
Its main pollinators are hematophagous parasites: Culicoides aricola, C. brunnicans, C. cataneii, C. circumscriptus, C. pulicari, C. punctatus, C. vexans, Odagamia ornata.

== Uses ==
In Olgunlar, the shoots are collected in April-May, boiled, then dried, and used for ayran and pilaf dishes.

== Bibliography ==
- GBIF (2025-05-13). "Arum rupicola Boiss. Occurrence Download". Global Biodiversity Information Facility. doi:10.15468/dl.83jsye.
- Łuczaj, Łukasz; Emre, Gizem (2025-02-13). "Lords-and-Ladies (Arum) as Food in Eurasia: A Review". Plants. 14 (4): 577. Bibcode:2025Plnts..14..577L. doi:10.3390/plants14040577. eISSN 2223-7747. PMC 11859539. PMID 40006836.
- Kew (2023). "Arum rupicola Boiss". International Plant Names Index and World Checklist of Vascular Plants.
- "Open-access Phytochemicals and antioxidant activities of twelve edible wild plants from Eastern Anatolia, Turkey". Food Science and Technology. 42. 2022. doi:10.1590/fst.18021. eISSN 1678-457X.
- Tofighi, Zahra; et al. (August 2021). "Identification of isoflavonoids in antioxidant effective fraction of Arum rupicola Boiss. leaves". Journal of Medicinal Plants. 20 (79): 13–23. doi:10.52547/jmp.20.79.14. eISSN 2717-2058.
- Oztürk, Munir; Altay, Volkan; Gücel, Salih; Altundağ Çakır, Çakir (2016-12-23). "Plant diversity of the drylands in Southeastern Anatolia-Turkey: role in human health and food security". Plant Biodiversity: Monitoring, Assessment and Conservation. pp. 84–124. doi:10.1079/9781780646947.00 (inactive 1 July 2025). ISBN 978-1-78064-695-4.
- Kaval, İdris (2011). Geçitli (Hakkari) ve çevresinin etnobotanik özellikleri [Etnobotanical features of Geçitli (Hakkari) and surroundings] (Thesis) (in Turkish). Van: Van Yüzüncü Yıl University.
- Rivera, Diego; Obón, Concepción; Heinrich, Michael; Inocencio, Cristina; Verde, Alonso; Fajardo, José (2006). "Gathered Mediterranean food plants – Ethnobotanical investigations and historical development". Local Mediterranean Food Plants and Nutraceuticals. Forum of Nutrition. Vol. 59. pp. 18–74. doi:10.1159/000095207. ISBN 978-3-318-01352-8. PMID 16917173.
- Николаевич Цвелёв, Николай (2006). "Araceae". Конспект флоры Кавказа (in Russian). Vol. 2. Saint Petersburg: Издательство Санкт-Петербургского университет. ISBN 5-288-04040-0.
- Gibernau, Marc; Macquart, David; Przetak, Gilles (2004). "Pollination in the genus Arum – a review" (PDF). Aroideana. 27: 148–166. ISSN 0197-4033.
- Kite, Geoffrey C.; et al. (2000). "Inflorescence odours and pollinators of Arum and Amorphophallus (Araceae)" (PDF). Reproductive Biology in Systematics, Conservation and Economic Botany. Royal Botanic Gardens, Kew. pp. 295–315. ISBN 1900347628.
- Boyce, Peter C. (1993-05-14). The Genus Arum. Kew Royal Botanic Gardens. ISBN 0112500854.
- Koach, J. (1985). Bio-ecological studies of flowering and pollination in Israeli Araceae (Thesis). Tel Aviv: University of Tel Aviv.
