= Kamışlı =

Kamışlı may refer to the following settlements in Turkey:

- Kamışlı, Bismil
- Kamışlı, Hakkâri
- Kamışlı, Karataş
- Kamışlı, Kozluk
- Kamışlı, Kulp
- Kamışlı, Merzifon
- Kamışlı, Nizip
- Kamışlı, Pozantı
- Kamışlı, Sungurlu
- Kamışlı, Yüksekova

== See also ==
- Qamishli, a city in northeastern Syria
