= Sarıtaş =

Sarıtaş may refer to:

== People ==
- Tolga Sarıtaş (born 1991), Turkish actor

== Places ==
- Sarıtaş, Baskil, a village in Elazığ Province, Turkey
- Sarıtaş, Hakkâri, a village in the central district of Hakkâri Province, Turkey
- Sarıtaş, Köprüköy, a neighbourhood in Erzurum Province, Turkey
- Sarıtaş, Tunceli, a village in Tunceli Province, Turkey
- Sarıtaş, Yüksekova, a village in Hakkâri Province, Turkey
