= Vate =

Vate or Väte may refer to:

- Île Vate, or just Vate, the French name for the island of Efate, Vanuatu
- Väte, a settlement on Gotland, Sweden
- Vate, alternative spelling of Vata, one half of the pair Vayu-Vata, Zoroastrian divinities
- Vate (magazine) a Zazaki Kurdish cultural magazine

== See also ==
- Vates, a term for a prophet, following the Latin term
