= İlbeyi, Kiğı =

Village in Bingöl Province, Turkey

İlbeyi
- Village
- Location within Turkey
- Coordinates: 39.354°N 40.419°E
- Country: Turkey
- Province: Bingöl
- District: Kiğı
- Population (2021): 12
- Time zone: UTC+3 (TRT)

İlbeyi (Kurdish: Elbeyî) is a village in the Kiğı District, Bingöl Province, Turkey. The village is populated by Kurds and had a population of 12 in 2021.

The hamlets of Aşağıelbeyi, Çatallı, Honik, Örtülü, Sadık, Tepebaşı and Yukarıelbiyi are attached to the village.
