= Üzümcü, Hakkâri =

Village in Hakkari Province, Turkey

Üzümcü
- Village
- Location within Turkey
- Coordinates: 37.496°N 43.583°E
- Country: Turkey
- Province: Hakkâri
- District: Hakkâri
- Population (2023): 609
- Time zone: UTC+3 (TRT)

Üzümcü (Kurdish: Dizê) is a village in the central district of Hakkâri Province in Turkey. The village is populated by Kurds of the Kaşuran and Silehî tribes and had a population of 609 in 2023.

The hamlets of Dola and Yeşiltaş are attached to Üzümcü.

== Population ==
Population history from 1997 to 2023:

Population
Year	Pop.	±%
1997	795	—
2007	770	−3.1%
2012	726	−5.7%
2017	612	−15.7%
2022	528	−13.7%
2023	609	+15.3%
