= Işıklar, Hakkâri =

Village in Hakkari Province, Turkey

Işıklar
- Village
- Location within Turkey
- Coordinates: 37.724°N 43.919°E
- Country: Turkey
- Province: Hakkâri
- District: Hakkâri
- Population (2023): 330
- Time zone: UTC+3 (TRT)

Işıklar (Kurdish: Pirkanis) is a village in the central district of Hakkâri Province in Turkey. The village is populated by Kurds of the Pinyanişî tribe and had a population of 330 in 2023.

The three hamlets of Çamışlar, Çavuşlu (Erdanis), Gelincik (Nepatkê), Soğucak and Küçükköşk (Qesir) are attached to Işıklar.

The film A Season in Hakkari is set in Pirkanis.

== Population ==
Population history from 1997 to 2023:

Population
Year	Pop.	±%
1997	122	—
2007	255	+109.0%
2012	334	+31.0%
2017	322	−3.6%
2022	340	+5.6%
2023	330	−2.9%
