= Oğul, Hakkâri =

Village in Hakkari Province, Turkey

Oğul
- Village
- Location within Turkey
- Coordinates: 37.435°N 43.756°E
- Country: Turkey
- Province: Hakkâri
- District: Hakkâri
- Population (2023): 193
- Time zone: UTC+3 (TRT)

Oğul (Kurdish: Tal) is a village in the central district of Hakkâri Province in Turkey. The village is populated by Kurds of the Geravî and Jirkî tribes and had a population of 193 in 2023.

The hamlets of Ağaçsız (Bêdarkê), Dilek (Ezîzanê), Göze (Bakê), Ilıca (Bêkurkê), Kavak (Rebet), Yayık (Meşxanê) and Yeşiltaş (Talane) are attached to Oğul.

== History ==
The village of Oğul was originally called ‘Tal’ which was an Assyrian village until Sayfo in 1915 and was subsequently unpopulated until a Kurd from the Jirkî tribe arrived to the village from Beytüşşebap in the second half of the 1930s. More Kurds subsequently settled in the village.

== Population ==
Population history from 1997 to 2023:

Population
Year	Pop.	±%
1997	97	—
2007	200	+106.2%
2012	225	+12.5%
2017	119	−47.1%
2022	155	+30.3%
2023	193	+24.5%
