= Doğanyurt, Hakkâri =

Village in Hakkari Province, Turkey

Doğanyurt
- Village
- Location within Turkey
- Coordinates: 37.72°N 43.938°E
- Country: Turkey
- Province: Hakkâri
- District: Hakkâri
- Population (2023): 357
- Time zone: UTC+3 (TRT)

Doğanyurt (Kurdish: Pîran) is a village in the central district of Hakkâri Province in Turkey. The village is populated by Kurds of the Pinyanişî tribe and had a population of 357 in 2023.

The four hamlets of Akdiken, Boğazlı (Gurgava), Gültepe (Gulê) and Soğucak (Feqî Balyan) and Yenihan are attached to Doğanyurt.

== Population ==
Population history from 1997 to 2023:

Population
Year	Pop.	±%
1997	308	—
2007	409	+32.8%
2012	465	+13.7%
2017	418	−10.1%
2022	377	−9.8%
2023	357	−5.3%
