= Ağaçöven, Kiğı =

Village in Bingöl Province, Turkey

Ağaçöven
- Village
- Location within Turkey
- Coordinates: 39.261°N 40.277°E
- Country: Turkey
- Province: Bingöl
- District: Kiğı
- Population (2021): 87
- Time zone: UTC+3 (TRT)

Ağaçöven, historically Hoğas Komları, is a village in the Kiğı District, Bingöl Province, Turkey. The village is populated by Kurds of the Giransor tribe and had a population of 87 in 2021.

The hamlets of Çakıllı and Kaledibi are attached to the village.
