= Genco Erkal =

Turkish actor (1938–2024)

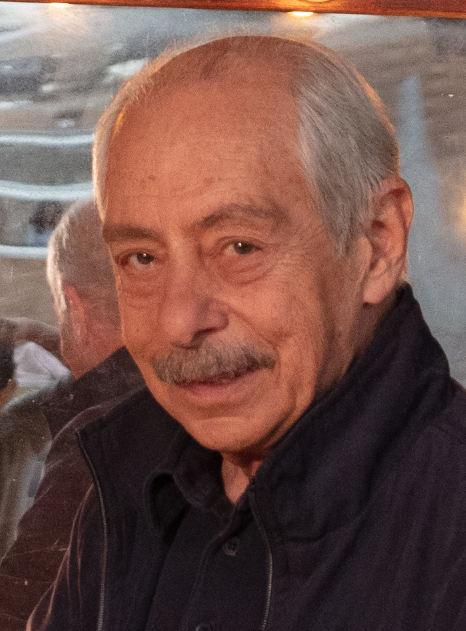
- Born: 28 March 1938; Istanbul, Turkey
- Died: 31 July 2024 (aged 86); Istanbul, Turkey
- Occupation: Actor
- Years active: 1959–2024
- Spouse: Zeynep Tedü (m. 1974; div. 1977)
- Children: 1

Genco Erkal in 2023

Genco Erkal (28 March 1938 – 31 July 2024) was a Turkish drama actor. He starred in the 1983 film A Season in Hakkari, which won the Silver Bear - Special Jury Prize at the 33rd Berlin International Film Festival. In April 2021, he announced that due to tweets in which he criticized the Turkish Government he was being prosecuted for insulting the President.

Erkal died of leukaemia on 31 July 2024, at the age of 86.

== Filmography ==
Year	Title	Role	Notes
1982	Faize hücum	Kamil	
1982	A Season in Hakkari	Teacher	
1982	At	Hüseyin, the father	
1990	Camdan Kalp	Kirpi	
2008	The Market: A Tale of Trade	Fazil	
2010	Sleeping Princess	Kahraman	
2016	Nâzım Oratorio	Genco Erkal	
2017	7yüz	Serhat	Episode: "Refakatçiler"
