= Duranlar, Kiğı =

Village in Bingöl Province, Turkey

Duranlar
- Village
- Location within Turkey
- Coordinates: 39.269°N 40.350°E
- Country: Turkey
- Province: Bingöl
- District: Kiğı
- Population (2021): 18
- Time zone: UTC+3 (TRT)

Duranlar (Kurdish: Axbizut) is a village in the Kiğı District, Bingöl Province, Turkey. The village is populated by Kurds and had a population of 18 in 2021.
