= Kuşçimeni, Kiğı =

Village in Bingöl Province, Turkey

Kuşçimeni
- Village
- Location within Turkey
- Coordinates: 39.193°N 40.346°E
- Country: Turkey
- Province: Bingöl
- District: Kiğı
- Population (2021): 61
- Time zone: UTC+3 (TRT)

Kuşçimeni (Kurdish: Karmuruna jêrin) is a village in the Kiğı District, Bingöl Province, Turkey. The village is populated by Kurds of the Seter tribe and had a population of 61 in 2021.

The hamlet of Aşağıkarmurun yaylası is attached to the village.
