= Yazgünü, Kiğı =

Village in Bingöl Province, Turkey

Yazgünü
- Village
- Location within Turkey
- Coordinates: 39.267°N 40.249°E
- Country: Turkey
- Province: Bingöl
- District: Kiğı
- Population (2021): 73
- Time zone: UTC+3 (TRT)

Yazgünü (Kurdish: Hopus) is a village in the Kiğı District, Bingöl Province, Turkey. The village is populated by Kurds of the Lolan and Şadiyan tribes and had a population of 73 in 2021.

The hamlet of Kalıntaş is attached to the village.
