= Baklalı, Kiğı =

Village in Bingöl Province, Turkey

Baklalı
- Village
- Location in Turkey
- Coordinates: 39.234°N 40.314°E
- Country: Turkey
- Province: Bingöl
- District: Kiğı
- Population (2021): 28
- Time zone: UTC+3 (TRT)

Baklalı, historically İngüzük (Kurdish: Inguzek), is a village in the Kiğı District, Bingöl Province, Turkey. The village is populated by Kurds of the Giransor tribe and had a population of 28 in 2021.
