= Sırmaçek, Kiğı =

Village in Bingöl Province, Turkey

Sırmaçek
- Village
- Location within Turkey
- Coordinates: 39.152°N 40.323°E
- Country: Turkey
- Province: Bingöl
- District: Kiğı
- Population (2021): 283
- Time zone: UTC+3 (TRT)

Sırmaçek (Kurdish: Kijikan) is a village in the Kiğı District, Bingöl Province, Turkey. The village is populated by Kurds of the Şadiyan tribe and had a population of 283 in 2021.
