= Kavaklı, Hakkâri =

Village in Hakkari Province, Turkey

Kavaklı
- Village
- Location within Turkey
- Coordinates: 37.513°N 43.384°E
- Country: Turkey
- Province: Hakkâri
- District: Hakkâri
- Population (2023): 307
- Time zone: UTC+3 (TRT)

Kavaklı (Kurdish: Marînus) is a village in the central district of Hakkâri Province in Turkey. The village is populated by Kurds of the Ertoşî tribe and other Kurds with a non-tribal background. The village had a population of 307 in 2023.

The four hamlets of Armutlu (Harê), Çaltepe (Kutos), Çeltik (Keha Hemzo) and Mezra are attached to Kavaklı.

== History ==
Portions of the non-tribal Kurdish population from Kavaklı migrated to neighboring Yoncalı.

== Population ==
Population history from 2007 to 2023:

Population
Year	Pop.	±%
2007	7	—
2012	65	+828.6%
2017	57	−12.3%
2022	130	+128.1%
2023	307	+136.2%
