= Kiğı District =

District of Bingöl Province, Turkey

- District
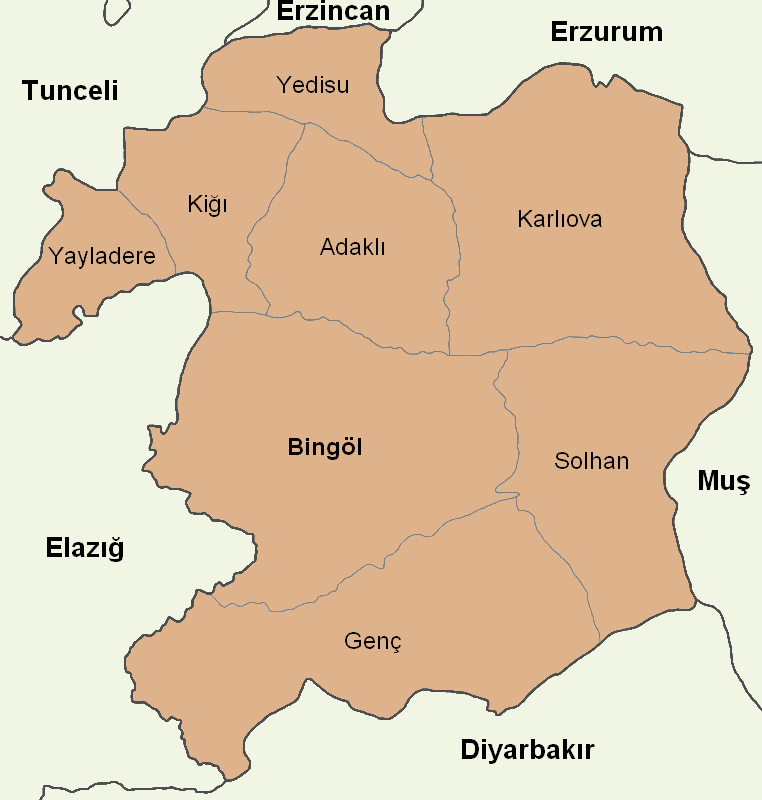
- Map showing Kığı District in Bingöl Province
- Country: Turkey
- Province: Bingöl
- Seat: Kiğı
- Population (2021): 4,801
- Time zone: UTC+3 (TRT)
- Website: www.kigi.gov.tr

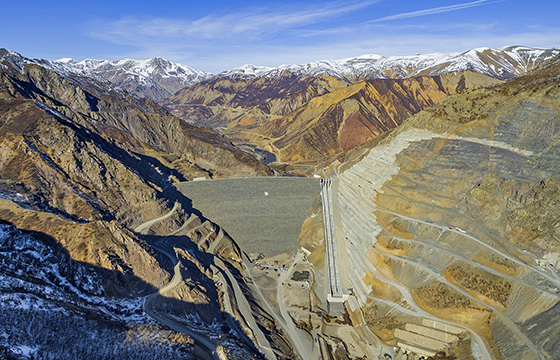
Kiğı Dam

Kiğı District is a district of Bingöl Province in Turkey. The town of Kiğı is the seat and the district had a population of 4,801 in 2021.

== Composition ==
Beside the town of Kiğı, the district encompasses twenty-nine villages and fifty-eight hamlets.

1. Açıkgüney (Sivgelik)
2. Ağaçöven (Hoxas komlari)
3. Alagöz (Elagoz)
4. Aşağıserinyer (Xajix)
5. Baklalı (Inguzek)
6. Billice (Bilecan)
7. Çanakçı (Cansor)
8. Çiçektepe (Avenk)
9. Çomak (Çomag)
10. Dallıca (Hoxas)
11. Darköprü (Hurs)
12. Demirdöş (Tirkan)
13. Demirkanat (Aqan)
14. Duranlar (Axbizut)
15. Eskikavak (Arik)
16. Eşme (Suvariş)
17. Güneyağıl (Cibir)
18. İlbeyi (Elbeyî)
19. Kadıköy (Kadi)
20. Kuşçimeni (Karmuruna jêrin)
21. Kutluca (Haçatur)
22. Nacaklı (Avirtinik)
23. Ölmez (Olmez)
24. Sabırtaşı (Haror)
25. Sırmaçek (Kijikan)
26. Tekbaş (Dizvaz)
27. Topraklık (Hequstun)
28. Yazgünü (Hopus)
29. Yukarıserinyer (Gajik)
