= Bağışlı, Hakkâri =

Village in Hakkari Province, Turkey

Bağışlı
- Village
- Location within Turkey
- Coordinates: 37.722°N 44.039°E
- Country: Turkey
- Province: Hakkâri
- District: Hakkâri
- Population (2023): 1,188
- Time zone: UTC+3 (TRT)

Bağışlı (Kurdish: Sîvelan) is a village in the central district of Hakkâri Province in Turkey. The village is populated by Kurds of the Pinyanişî tribe and had a population of 1,188 in 2023.

The hamlets of Akyıldız, Aşağı Kayacık (Şetinîsa jêrî), Bilgili (Hotkan) and Budaklı (Kivil) are attached to Bağışlı.

== Population ==
Population history from 1997 to 2023:

Population
Year	Pop.	±%
1997	1,200	—
2007	1,303	+8.6%
2012	1,332	+2.2%
2017	1,250	−6.2%
2022	1,192	−4.6%
2023	1,188	−0.3%
