= Güneyağıl, Kiğı =

Village in Bingöl Province, Turkey

Güneyağıl
- Village
- Location within Turkey
- Coordinates: 39.289°N 40.335°E
- Country: Turkey
- Province: Bingöl
- District: Kiğı
- Population (2021): 53
- Time zone: UTC+3 (TRT)

Güneyağıl (Kurdish: Cibir) is a village in the Kiğı District, Bingöl Province, Turkey. The village is populated by Kurds of the Giransor tribe and had a population of 53 in 2021.
