= Bayköy, Hakkâri =

Village in Hakkari Province, Turkey

Bayköy
- Village
- Location within Turkey
- Coordinates: 37.549°N 43.721°E
- Country: Turkey
- Province: Hakkâri
- District: Hakkâri
- Population (2023): 631
- Time zone: UTC+3 (TRT)

Bayköy (Kurdish: Bay) is a village in the central district of Hakkâri Province in Turkey. The village is populated by Kurds of the Pinyanişî tribe and had a population of 631 in 2023.

The hamlet of Dereköy is attached to the village.

The village is located just south of Hakkâri.

== Population ==
Population history from 1997 to 2023:

Population
Year	Pop.	±%
1997	619	—
2007	632	+2.1%
2012	603	−4.6%
2017	616	+2.2%
2022	605	−1.8%
2023	631	+4.3%
