= Yukarıserinyer, Kiğı =

Village in Bingöl Province, Turkey

Yukarıserinyer
- Village
- Location within Turkey
- Coordinates: 39.210°N 40.257°E
- Country: Turkey
- Province: Bingöl
- District: Kiğı
- Population (2021): 27
- Time zone: UTC+3 (TRT)

Yukarıserinyer (Kurdish: Gajik) is a village in the Kiğı District, Bingöl Province, Turkey. The village is populated by Kurds of the Şadiyan tribe and had a population of 27 in 2021.

The hamlet of Çakırlı is attached to the village.
