= Eskikavak, Kiğı =

Village in Bingöl Province, Turkey

Eskikavak
- Village
- Location within Turkey
- Coordinates: 39.289°N 40.397°E
- Country: Turkey
- Province: Bingöl
- District: Kiğı
- Population (2021): 102
- Time zone: UTC+3 (TRT)

Eskikavak (Kurdish: Arik) is a village in the Kiğı District, Bingöl Province, Turkey. The village is populated by Kurds of the Şadiyan tribe and had a population of 102 in 2021.

The hamlets of Eski Kavak and Seyitdüzü are attached to the village.
