= Çiçektepe, Kiğı =

Village in Bingöl Province, Turkey

Çiçektepe
- Village
- Location within Turkey
- Coordinates: 39.293°N 40.297°E
- Country: Turkey
- Province: Bingöl
- District: Kiğı
- Population (2021): 60
- Time zone: UTC+3 (TRT)

Çiçektepe is a village in the Kiğı District, Bingöl Province, Turkey. The population was 60 people in 2021.

The hamlet of Soğukpınar is attached to the village.
