= Demirkanat, Kiğı =

Village in Bingöl Province, Turkey

Demirkanat
- Village
- Location within Turkey
- Coordinates: 39.209°N 40.330°E
- Country: Turkey
- Province: Bingöl
- District: Kiğı
- Population (2021): 20
- Time zone: UTC+3 (TRT)

Demirkanat (Kurdish: Aqan) is a village in the Kiğı District, Bingöl Province, Turkey. The village is populated by Kurds of the Şadiyan tribe and had a population of 20 in 2021.

The hamlet of Uzunmaşat yaylası is attached to the village.
