= Darköprü, Kiğı =

Village in Bingöl Province, Turkey

Darköprü
- Village
- Location within Turkey
- Coordinates: 39.198°N 40.295°E
- Country: Turkey
- Province: Bingöl
- District: Kiğı
- Population (2021): 22
- Time zone: UTC+3 (TRT)

Darköprü (Kurdish: Hurs) is a village in the Kiğı District, Bingöl Province, Turkey. The village is populated by Kurds of the Şadiyan tribe and had a population of 22 in 2021.

The hamlets of Kılçan, Şemo and Toş are attached to the village.
