= Kavalköy, Hakkâri =

Village in Hakkari Province, Turkey

Kavalköy
- Village
- Location within Turkey
- Coordinates: 37.536°N 43.494°E
- Country: Turkey
- Province: Hakkâri
- District: Hakkâri
- Population (2023): 138
- Time zone: UTC+3 (TRT)

Kavalköy (Kurdish: Qewal) is a village in the central district of Hakkâri Province in Turkey. The village is populated by Kurds of the Ertoşî tribe and had a population of 138 in 2023.

The hamlets of Çelebî (Çalebî), Esenler (Bêgirê), Kasır (Qesir) and Yazlık (Gûzik) are attached to Kavalköy.

== Population ==
Population history from 2007 to 2023:

Population
Year	Pop.	±%
2007	61	—
2012	124	+103.3%
2017	121	−2.4%
2022	148	+22.3%
2023	138	−6.8%
