= Alagöz, Kiğı =

Village in Bingöl Province, Turkey

Alagöz
- Village
- Location within Turkey
- Coordinates: 39.179°N 40.321°E
- Country: Turkey
- Province: Bingöl
- District: Kiğı
- Population (2021): 47
- Time zone: UTC+3 (TRT)

Alagöz is a village in the Kiğı District, Bingöl Province, Turkey. The village is populated by Kurds and had a population of 47 in 2021.
