= Sabırtaşı, Kiğı =

Village in Bingöl Province, Turkey

Sabırtaşı
- Village
- Location within Turkey
- Coordinates: 39.286°N 40.188°E
- Country: Turkey
- Province: Bingöl
- District: Kiğı
- Population (2021): 91
- Time zone: UTC+3 (TRT)

Sabırtaşı (Kurdish: Haror) is a village in the Kiğı District, Bingöl Province, Turkey. The village is populated by Kurds of the Giransor tribe and had a population of 91 in 2021.

The hamlets of Ilıcalar, Sakasor Yaylası and Uçaklı are attached to the village.
