= Elmacık, Hakkâri =

Village in Hakkari Province, Turkey

Elmacık
- Village
- Location within Turkey
- Coordinates: 37.550°N 43.487°E
- Country: Turkey
- Province: Hakkâri
- District: Hakkâri
- Population (2023): 176
- Time zone: UTC+3 (TRT)

Elmacık (Kurdish: Nispas) is a village in the central district of Hakkâri Province in Turkey. The village is populated by Kurds of the Ertoşi tribe and had a population of 176 in 2023.

The hamlet of Köyceğiz is attached to the village.

== Population ==
Population history from 1997 to 2023:

Population
Year	Pop.	±%
1997	159	—
2007	82	−48.4%
2012	118	+43.9%
2017	132	+11.9%
2022	146	+10.6%
2023	176	+20.5%
