= Zeynep Tedü =

Turkish actress

- Born: 22 October 1943 (age 82); Istanbul, Turkey
- Occupation: Actress
- Years active: 1964–2000
- Spouse(s): Salih Güney (m. 1967; div. 1969) Genco Erkal (m. 1974; div. 1977)
- Father: Suavi Tedü

Zeynep Tedü (born 22 October 1943) is a Turkish theater and film actress.

== Background ==
Zeynep Tedü was born on 22 October 1943 in Istanbul. She attended the Milan Theater School in Italy. She started her professional theater career in 1964 with the play "Boulevard" at Dormen Theater. In 1965 she started acting in cinema as well as theater, with the film "Bozuk Düzen" which was chosen as the "Best Film" at the Antalya Golden Orange Film Festival.

== Filmography ==
- Bugünün Saraylısı - 1985
- Çileli Dünya - 1972
- Ömrümce Unutamadım- Ömrümce Aradım - 1971
- Beklenen Şarkı - 1971
- Afacan - 1970
- Kalbimin Efendisi - 1970
- Merhamet - 1970
- Mağrur Kadın - 1970
- Acımak - 1970
- Zindandan Gelen Mektup - 1970
- Seven Ne Yapmaz - 1970
- Bülbül Yuvası - 1970
- İki Yetime - 1969
- Ölüme Giden Yol - 1969
- Aşk Eski Bir Yalan - 1968
- Bozuk Düzen - 1965
