= Işık, Hakkâri =

Village in Hakkari Province, Turkey

Işık
- Village
- Location within Turkey
- Coordinates: 37.621°N 43.541°E
- Country: Turkey
- Province: Hakkâri
- District: Hakkâri
- Population (2023): 440
- Time zone: UTC+3 (TRT)

Işık (Kurdish: Nîşê) is a village in the central district of Hakkâri Province in Turkey. The village is populated by Kurds of the Ertoşî tribe and had a population of 440 in 2023.

The hamlets of Tepecik (Guvik) and Yapraklı (Werkanis) are attached to Işık.

== Population ==
Population history from 1997 to 2023:

Population
Year	Pop.	±%
1997	392	—
2007	575	+46.7%
2012	549	−4.5%
2017	489	−10.9%
2022	445	−9.0%
2023	440	−1.1%
