= Kırıkdağ, Hakkâri =

Village in Hakkari Province, Turkey

Kırıkdağ
- Village
- Location within Turkey
- Coordinates: 37.617°N 43.857°E
- Country: Turkey
- Province: Hakkâri
- District: Hakkâri
- Population (2023): 1,286
- Time zone: UTC+3 (TRT)

Kırıkdağ (Kurdish: Dêz) is a village in the central district of Hakkâri Province in Turkey. The village is populated by Kurds of the Jirkî tribe and had a population of 1,286 in 2023.

The hamlets of Dikmen, Gümüşlü (Kursinê), Kırbaş, Su and Yüce are attached to Kırıkdağ.

== Population ==
Population history from 1997 to 2023:

Population
Year	Pop.	±%
1997	1,569	—
2007	1,876	+19.6%
2012	1,958	+4.4%
2017	1,237	−36.8%
2022	1,254	+1.4%
2023	1,286	+2.6%
