= Vate (magazine) =

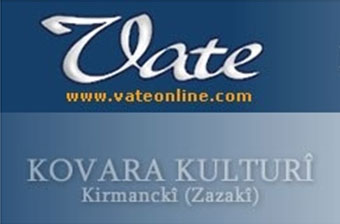

Vate (meaning: word, say) is a quarterly cultural magazine (journal) published entirely in Kirmancki (Zazaki) Kurdish.

Vate Magazine is the publication of the Vate Study Group, which has been working on the standardization of Kirmanckî (Zazaki) since 1996. The results of the Vate Study Group on standardization studies are published in the Vate Journal. Modern literary texts such as poetry and stories in the magazine; folklore collections such as tales, anecdotes, proverbs, idioms; linguistic articles in which topics such as spelling and grammar are evaluated; Memoirs, biographies, interviews, and cultural articles on religion, history and geography are edited and published in accordance with the standards of the Vate Study Group. According to a study on the compilation of Zazaki (Kirdkî) tales, Vate Magazine has taken the most important place in terms of writing Zaza tales since the 1850s, when the first Zaza texts were published. Some fairy tales selected from Vate Magazine were published in book form under the name Sanikê Vateyî (Vate Tales), as well as other fairy tales in the magazine were classified locally and published as separate books. Again, it is seen that some of the anecdotes, stories, poems and interviews in the magazine were published as selections or as separate books according to their authors.

Vate, the first issue of which was published in Sweden in 1997, continued its publication in Turkey as of 2003. Linguist writer Malmîsanij was the chief editor of the Istanbul-based journal for many years. Munzur Çem has been the chief editor of the journal since the 35th issue.

According to the statistics released by considering the first 33 issues of the journal, more than 150 people wrote in Vate Magazine.

Vate Magazine is the longest-running magazine that has been publishing in Zazaki since 1997. In this respect, it has played an important role in the Zazaki literature and has become one of the main sources used by many linguists working on the Zazaki.
