= Ceylanlı, Hakkâri =

Village in Hakkari Province, Turkey

Ceylanlı
- Village
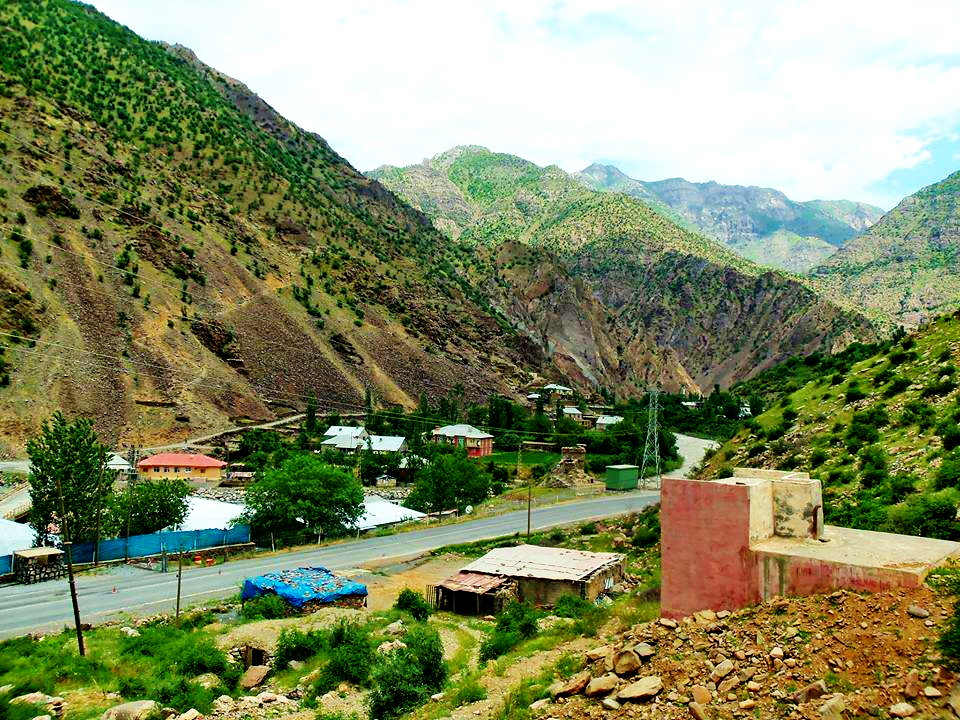
- Seyitli hamlet

- Location within Turkey
- Coordinates: 37.422°N 43.621°E
- Country: Turkey
- Province: Hakkâri
- District: Hakkâri
- Population (2023): 235
- Time zone: UTC+3 (TRT)

Ceylanlı (Kurdish: Walto, Weltû, Syriac: Walṭō) is a village in the central district of Hakkâri Province in Turkey. It is populated by Kurds of the Jirkî tribe and had a population of 235 in 2023.

The hamlets of Doğanlı (Daruşê), Geçimli, Gelinli (Mêbûk), Seyitli (Kelêtan, Qelāyāṯā), Sütçüler (Sirtê) and Yığınlı (Dihiyê) are attached to Ceylanlı.

== History ==
The village was historically populated by Assyrians and located in the Hakkari region.

== Population ==
Population history from 1997 to 2023:

Population
Year	Pop.	±%
1997	583	—
2007	281	−51.8%
2012	345	+22.8%
2017	239	−30.7%
2022	226	−5.4%
2023	235	+4.0%
