= Pınarca, Hakkâri =

Village in Hakkari Province, Turkey

Pınarca
- Village
- Location within Turkey
- Coordinates: 37.669°N 43.535°E
- Country: Turkey
- Province: Hakkâri
- District: Hakkâri
- Population (2023): 169
- Time zone: UTC+3 (TRT)

Pınarca (Kurdish: Balekan) is a village in the central district of Hakkâri Province in Turkey. The village is populated by Kurds of the Gewdan and Jirkî tribes and had a population of 169 in 2023.

The ten hamlets of Ayranlı (Kemîte), Çatdere (Zeranisa jêrî), Çaylı (Tenzure), Hendek (Xendek), Işıklı (Malqosan), Sarıköy (Zeranisa jorî), Taşlıca (Gewirkan), Uğurlu (Bêdan) and Yeniyol (Navgûzan) are attached to Pınarca.

== Population ==
Population history from 2007 to 2023:

Population
Year	Pop.	±%
2007	200	—
2012	166	−17.0%
2017	167	+0.6%
2022	166	−0.6%
2023	169	+1.8%
