= Aşağı Derecik, Hakkâri =

Village in Hakkari Province, Turkey

Aşağı Derecik
- Village
- Location within Turkey
- Coordinates: 37.606°N 43.874°E
- Country: Turkey
- Province: Hakkâri
- District: Hakkâri
- Population (2023): 638
- Time zone: UTC+3 (TRT)

Aşağı Derecik (Kurdish: Çemî Şemaşê, Syriac: Beṯ Shammāshā) is a village in the central district of Hakkâri Province in Turkey. The village is populated by Kurds of the Pirosî tribe and had a population of 638 in 2023.

The hamlets of Dez (Dêzê), Dikmen (Mate), Haput 1/Haput 2 (Çemê Seravinis), Seranüs (Seravînis), Sulak (Sûsê), Trafik (Dêra Dînan), Yukarı Derecik and Yüce (Aqos) are attached to Aşağı Derecik.

== History ==
The village was populated by 32 Assyrian families in 1850, while 40 families were recorded in 1877.

== Population ==
Population history from 2015 to 2023:

Population
Year	Pop.	±%
2015	733	—
2018	708	−3.4%
2020	735	+3.8%
2023	638	−13.2%
