= Aksu, Hakkâri =

Village in Hakkari Province, Turkey

Aksu
- Village
- Location within Turkey
- Coordinates: 37.726°N 43.600°E
- Country: Turkey
- Province: Hakkâri
- District: Hakkâri
- Population (2023): 27
- Time zone: UTC+3 (TRT)

Aksu (Kurdish: Bileh) is a village in the central district of Hakkâri Province in Turkey. The village is populated by Kurds of the Mamxûran tribe and had a population of 27 in 2023.

The hamlets of Atbaşı (Mafkan), Çığır (Gundik), Çiçekli (Binefşan), Duran (Çarkêlan), Güngören (Dêrzengil) and Oymak (Kanî Mihanê) are attached to the village.

== Population ==
Population history from 1997 to 2023:

Population
Year	Pop.	±%
1997	0	—
2007	0	0.00%
2012	0	0.00%
2017	20	—
2022	30	+50.0%
2023	27	−10.0%
