= Tekbaş, Kiğı =

Village in Bingöl Province, Turkey

Tekbaş
- Village
- Location within Turkey
- Coordinates: 39.359°N 40.336°E
- Country: Turkey
- Province: Bingöl
- District: Kiğı
- Population (2021): 12
- Time zone: UTC+3 (TRT)

Tekbaş (Kurdish: Dizvaz) is a village in the Kiğı District, Bingöl Province, Turkey. The village is populated by Kurds of the Kurêşan tribe and had a population of 12 in 2021.

The hamlet of Dizvoz yaylası and Duygulu are attached to the village.
