= A Season in Hakkari =

1983 film

- Film poster
- Directed by: Erden Kıral
- Written by: Ferit Edgü; Onat Kutlar
- Starring: Genco Erkal
- Cinematography: Kenan Ormanlar
- Edited by: Yilmaz Atadeniz
- Release date: February 1983
- Running time: 110 minutes
- Country: Turkey
- Language: Turkish

A Season in Hakkari (Turkish: Hakkâri'de Bir Mevsim) is a 1983 Turkish drama film directed by Erden Kıral. It was entered into the 33rd Berlin International Film Festival, where it won the Silver Bear - Special Jury Prize. The film is set in Pirkanis in rural Hakkâri.

== Plot ==
A disciplinary transfer leads a teacher into a remote village somewhere in the mountains. There are neither conventional roads nor electricity. Although the teacher will only stay for the winter, he puts a lot of effort into educating the local children while he can.

== Cast ==
- Rana Cabbar
- Erol Demiröz
- Genco Erkal as teacher
- Berrin Koper
- Serif Sezer
- Erkan Yücel
