= Dallıca, Kiğı =

Village in Bingöl Province, Turkey

Dallıca
- Village
- Location within Turkey
- Coordinates: 39.252°N 40.294°E
- Country: Turkey
- Province: Bingöl
- District: Kiğı
- Population (2021): 64
- Time zone: UTC+3 (TRT)

Dallıca (Kurdish: Hoxas) is a village in the Kiğı District, Bingöl Province, Turkey. The village is populated by turkish residents and had a population of 64 in 2021.

The hamlets of Orman yaylası and Sütçüler are attached to the village.
