= Cevizdibi, Hakkâri =

Village in Hakkari Province, Turkey

Cevizdibi
- Village
- Location within Turkey
- Coordinates: 37.549°N 43.481°E
- Country: Turkey
- Province: Hakkâri
- District: Hakkâri
- Population (2023): 155
- Time zone: UTC+3 (TRT)

Cevizdibi (Kurdish: Bêtkar) is a village in the central district of Hakkâri Province in Turkey. The village is populated by Kurds of the Ertoşi tribe and had a population of 155 in 2023.

The village was depopulated in the 1990s during the Kurdish–Turkish conflict.

== Population ==
Population history from 2007 to 2023:

Population
Year	Pop.	±%
2007	34	—
2012	89	+161.8%
2017	126	+41.6%
2022	129	+2.4%
2023	155	+20.2%
