= Nacaklı, Kiğı =

Village in Bingöl Province, Turkey

Nacaklı
- Village
- Location within Turkey
- Coordinates: 39.171°N 40.331°E
- Country: Turkey
- Province: Bingöl
- District: Kiğı
- Population (2021): 373
- Time zone: UTC+3 (TRT)

Nacaklı (Kurdish: Avirtinik) is a village in the Kiğı District, Bingöl Province, Turkey. The village is populated by Kurds of the Şadiyan tribe and had a population of 373 in 2021.

The hamlets of Alacalı, Buzluk, Çömlek, Dikenli, Incesu and Yağmurlu are attached to the village.
