= Açıkgüney, Kiğı =

Village in Bingöl Province, Turkey

Açıkgüney
- Village
- Location within Turkey
- Coordinates: 39.263°N 40.219°E
- Country: Turkey
- Province: Bingöl
- District: Kiğı
- Population (2021): 92
- Time zone: UTC+3 (TRT)

Açıkgüney, historically Sivgelik or Sergevil, is a village in the Kiğı District, Bingöl Province, Turkey. The village is populated by Kurds of the Giransor tribe and had a population of 92 in 2021. The village was inhabited by Armenians until the Armenian genocide.

The hamlets of Günaltay, Hoz Taşı and Samantepe are attached to the village.
