= Kiğı =

Municipality of Bingöl Province, Turkey

- Municipality
- Location within Turkey
- Coordinates: 39°18′35″N 40°20′58″E
- Country: Turkey
- Province: Bingöl
- District: Kiğı

Government
  - Mayor: Hikmet Özüağ (AKP)
- Population (2021): 2,926
- Time zone: UTC+3 (TRT)
- Website: www.kigi.bel.tr

Kiğı (Kurdish: Gêxî; Armenian: Քղի, romanized: Kʿġi) is a town and seat of the Kiğı District of Bingöl Province in Turkey. The mayor is Hikmet Özüağ (AKP).

The town is populated by Kurds of the Giransor tribe and had a population of 2,926 in 2021.

== Neighborhoods ==
The town is divided into the neighborhoods of Abar, Eskişehir, Yenişehir and Yeşilyurt.

== History ==
Historically this area was ruled by different Armenian, Byzantine, Kurdish and Turkic dynasties. During the Middle Ages, Kiğı had been a mint town of the Ilkhanids The town became a part of the Ottoman Empire was a sanjak of the Erzurum Eyalet. Historically a nearby iron mine was used but mining stopped in 17th century. The main sights in the town are the citadel, the mosque built in 1401/02 and commissioned by Pir Ali son of the Aq Qoyunlu Kutlu. The medieval Muslim tomb and bathhouse of Yazıcızadeler and the ruins of a church. There were battles in this area between the Russians and Ottomans during World War I. The current location of the town was moved here after a Safavid raid in the 16th century, the old site was near the citadel. But the present structure is largely a restoration from later times.

== Demographics ==
In 1891, the kaza had 41,225 inhabitants, including 12,040 Armenians. In 1909, 16,255 Armenians lived in 50 villages. On the eve of the first World War, 19,859 Armenians lived in the kaza. They had 45 churches, five monasteries, and 63 schools. They were deported on 8 June 1915 as part of the Armenian genocide. Most of them were massacred by the Special Organization.

Mother tongue, Kiğı District, 1927 Turkish census
Turkish	Arabic	Kurdish	Circassian	Armenian	Unknown or other languages
4,600	–	21,800	88	43	7

Religion, Kiğı District, 1927 Turkish census
Muslim	Armenian	Orthodox	Other Christian
26,486	46	1	5

== Notable people ==
- Munzur Çem
