= Kutluca, Kiğı =

Village in Bingöl Province, Turkey

Kutluca
- Village
- Location within Turkey
- Coordinates: 39.219°N 40.299°E
- Country: Turkey
- Province: Bingöl
- District: Kiğı
- Population (2021): 8
- Time zone: UTC+3 (TRT)

Kutluca (Kurdish: Haçatur) is a village in the Kiğı District, Bingöl Province, Turkey. The village is populated by Kurds of the Şadiyan tribe and had a population of 8 in 2021.
