= Yoncalı, Hakkâri =

Village in Hakkari Province, Turkey

Yoncalı
- Village
- Location within Turkey
- Coordinates: 37.494°N 43.381°E
- Country: Turkey
- Province: Hakkâri
- District: Hakkâri
- Population (2023): 14
- Time zone: UTC+3 (TRT)

Yoncalı (Kurdish: Anîtos) is a village in the central district of Hakkâri Province in Turkey. The village is populated by Kurds of a non-tribal background and had a population of 14 in 2023.

== History ==
The non-tribal Kurdish population residing in Yoncalı migrated from neighboring Kavaklı.

== Population ==
Population history from 2013 to 2023:

Population
Year	Pop.	±%
2013	2	—
2018	11	+450.0%
2023	14	+27.3%
