= Akçalı, Hakkâri =

Village in Hakkari Province, Turkey

Akçalı
- Village
- Location within Turkey
- Coordinates: 37.709°N 43.990°E
- Country: Turkey
- Province: Hakkâri
- District: Hakkâri
- Population (2023): 704
- Time zone: UTC+3 (TRT)

Akçalı (Kurdish: Gezne, Syriac: Geznā) is a village in the central district of Hakkâri Province in Turkey. The village is populated by Kurds of the Pinyanişî tribe and had a population of 704 in 2023.

The hamlets of Eğercik (Palanis), Kanatlı (Reşankê) and Yeniyol (Brîman) are attached to Akçalı.

== History ==
George Percy Badger noted during his visit to the region in 1850 that the village had a population of 90 Assyrian families, while Edward Lewes Cutts deemed the village to be populated by Kurds in 1877.

== Population ==
Population history from 1997 to 2023:

Population
Year	Pop.	±%
1997	689	—
2007	914	+32.7%
2012	928	+1.5%
2017	798	−14.0%
2022	765	−4.1%
2023	704	−8.0%
