= Akkuş, Hakkâri =

Village in Hakkari Province, Turkey

Akkuş
- Village
- Location within Turkey
- Coordinates: 37.618°N 43.501°E
- Country: Turkey
- Province: Hakkâri
- District: Hakkâri
- Population (2023): 182
- Time zone: UTC+3 (TRT)

Akkuş (Kurdish: Dêr) is a village in the central district of Hakkâri Province in Turkey. The village is populated by Kurds of the Mamxûran tribe and had a population of 182 in 2023.

The hamlet of Çetintaş (Hergêl) is attached to the village.

== Population ==
Population history from 1997 to 2023:

Population
Year	Pop.	±%
1997	0	—
2007	124	—
2012	76	−38.7%
2017	76	+0.0%
2022	86	+13.2%
2023	182	+111.6%
