= Eşme, Kiğı =

Village in Bingöl Province, Turkey

Eşme
- Village
- Location in Turkey
- Coordinates: 39.264°N 40.334°E
- Country: Turkey
- Province: Bingöl
- District: Kiğı
- Population (2021): 17
- Time zone: UTC+3 (TRT)

Eşme (Kurdish: Suvariş) is a village in the Kiğı District, Bingöl Province, Turkey. The village is populated by Kurds of the Şadiyan tribe and had a population of 17 in 2021.
