= Ağaçdibi, Hakkâri =

Village in Hakkari Province, Turkey

Ağaçdibi
- Village
- Location within Turkey
- Coordinates: 37.502°N 43.790°E
- Country: Turkey
- Province: Hakkâri
- District: Hakkâri
- Population (2023): 492
- Time zone: UTC+3 (TRT)

Ağaçdibi (Kurdish: Kehê) is a village in the central district of Hakkâri Province in Turkey. The village is populated by Kurds of the Jirkî tribe and had a population of 492 in 2023.

== Population ==
Population history from 1997 to 2023:

Population
Year	Pop.	±%
1997	553	—
2007	649	+17.4%
2012	678	+4.5%
2017	532	−21.5%
2022	508	−4.5%
2023	492	−3.1%
