= Geçitli, Hakkâri =

Village in Hakkari Province, Turkey

Geçitli
- Village
- Location within Turkey
- Coordinates: 37.589°N 43.566°E
- Country: Turkey
- Province: Hakkâri
- District: Hakkâri
- Population (2023): 1,509
- Time zone: UTC+3 (TRT)

Geçitli (Kurdish: Peyanis) is a village in the central district of Hakkâri Province in Turkey. The village is populated by Kurds of the Gewdan and Pinyanişî tribes and had a population of 1,509 in 2023. Geçitli is the most populous village in the central district of Hakkâri Province.

== Population ==
Population history from 1997 to 2023:

Population
| Year | Pop. | ±% |
|---|---|---|
| 1997 | 1,729 | — |
| 2007 | 2,032 | +17.5% |
| 2012 | 2,074 | +2.1% |
| 2017 | 1,782 | −14.1% |
| 2022 | 1,561 | −12.4% |
| 2023 | 1,509 | −3.3% |
