= Geçimli, Hakkâri =

Village in Hakkari Province, Turkey

Geçimli
- Village
- Location within Turkey
- Coordinates: 37.394°N 43.533°E
- Country: Turkey
- Province: Hakkâri
- District: Hakkâri
- Population (2023): 576
- Time zone: UTC+3 (TRT)

Geçimli (Kurdish: Rumtik) is a village in the central district of Hakkâri Province in Turkey. The village is populated by Kurds of the Kaşuran tribe and had a population of 576 in 2023.

The village was depopulated in the 1990s during the Kurdish–Turkish conflict.

== Population ==
Population history from 1997 to 2023:

Population
Year	Pop.	±%
1997	651	—
2007	721	+10.8%
2012	708	−1.8%
2017	591	−16.5%
2022	568	−3.9%
2023	576	+1.4%
