= Durankaya, Hakkâri =

Municipality in Hakkari Province, Turkey

Durankaya
- Municipality
- Location in Turkey
- Coordinates: 37.554°N 43.612°E
- Country: Turkey
- Province: Hakkâri
- District: Hakkâri
- Population (2023): 3,786
- Time zone: UTC+3 (TRT)

Durankaya (Kurdish: Silehya) is a municipality (belde) in the central district of Hakkâri Province in Turkey. The settlement is populated by Kurds of the Silehî tribe and had a population of 3,786 in 2023.

== Population ==
Population history from 1997 to 2023:

Population
Year	Pop.	±%
1997	3,093	—
2007	3,789	+22.5%
2012	3,475	−8.3%
2017	2,870	−17.4%
2022	2,715	−5.4%
2023	3,786	+39.4%
