= Otluca, Hakkâri =

Village in Hakkari Province, Turkey

Otluca
- Village
- Location within Turkey
- Coordinates: 37.605°N 43.708°E
- Country: Turkey
- Province: Hakkâri
- District: Hakkâri
- Population (2023): 967
- Time zone: UTC+3 (TRT)

Otluca (Kurdish: Xenanis, Syriac: Ḥānānīs) is a village in the central district of Hakkâri Province in Turkey. The village is populated by Kurds of the Gewdan and Pinyanişî tribes. The village had a population of 967 in 2023.

The nine hamlets of Ağılcık (Gova Sadê), Düzce, Güzelköy (Xelîlan), Köprüce (Bêkurupe), Mezraa, Sarıkaya (Gûza Gavanan), Tümsek (Sûmanê), Uyanık (Xwerizan) and Yukarı Otluca (Xenanisa jorî) are attached to Otluca.

== Population ==
Population history from 1997 to 2023:

Population
Year	Pop.	±%
1997	158	—
2007	458	+189.9%
2012	3,031	+561.8%
2017	2,607	−14.0%
2022	784	−69.9%
2023	967	+23.3%
