= Billice, Kiğı =

Village in Bingöl Province, Turkey

Billice
- Village
- Location within Turkey
- Coordinates: 39°18′N 40°09′E
- Country: Turkey
- Province: Bingöl
- District: Kiğı
- Population (2021): 120
- Time zone: UTC+3 (TRT)

Billice (Kurdish: Bilecan) is a village in the Kiğı District, Bingöl Province, Turkey. The village is populated by Kurds of the Şadiyan tribe and had a population of 120 in 2021.

The hamlets of Akçalı, Altındiş, Düzağaç, Gedikli, Hışman, Karınca, Kurşunlu, Kuşluca, Mugan yaylası, Sakasor yaylası, Solmaz, Taşağıl and Uzundal are attached to the village.
