= Hakkâri District =

District in Hakkâri Province, Turkey

Coordinates: 37°34′28.88″N 43°44′10.32″E

- District
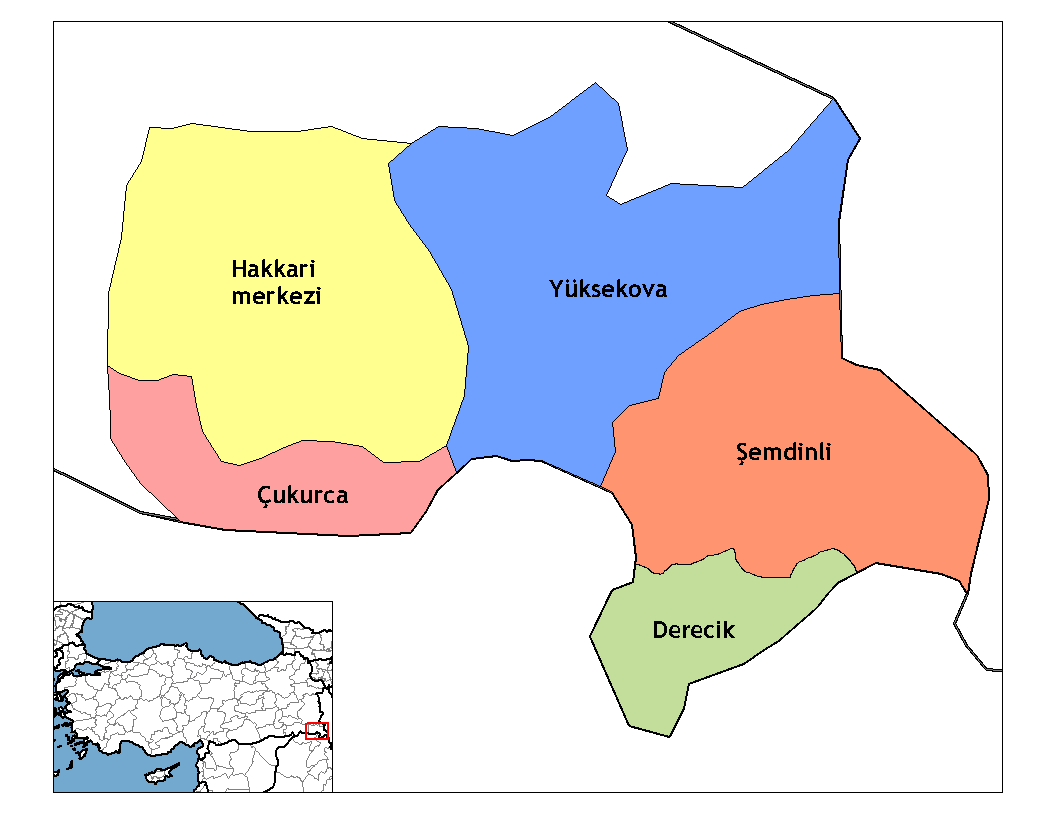
- Map showing Hakkâri District in Hakkâri Province
- Country: Turkey
- Province: Hakkâri
- Seat: Hakkâri
- Area: 2,179 km^{2} (841 sq mi)
- Population (2023): 77,273
  - Density: 35.46/km^{2} (91.85/sq mi)
- Time zone: UTC+3 (TRT)

Hakkâri District is the central district of the Hakkâri Province in Turkey. The district had a population of 77,273 people in 2023 with the city of Hakkâri being its seat. Its area is 2,179 km^{2}.

The district was established in 1935.

== Composition ==
There are two municipalities in Hakkâri District:

- Durankaya (Silehya)
- Hakkâri (Colemêrg)

=== Villages and hamlets ===
The district has thirty-six villages with moreover 112 hamlets. List of villages:

1. Ağaçdibi (Kehe)
2. Akbulut (Goranis)
3. Akçalı (Gezne)
4. Akkuş (Dêr)
5. Aksu (Bileh)
6. Aşağı Derecik (Çemî Şemaşê)
7. Bağışlı (Sîvelan)
8. Bayköy (Bayê)
9. Boybeyi (Asingiran)
10. Cevizdibi (Betkar)
11. Ceylanlı (Walto)
12. Çaltıkoru (Sêwînê)
13. Çanaklı (Baz)
14. Çimenli (Çemîbedel)
15. Demirtaş (Evranis)
16. Doğanyurt (Pîran)
17. Elmacık (Nispas)
18. Geçimli (Rondik)
19. Geçitli (Peyanis)
20. Işık (Nîşê)
21. Işıklar (Pirkanis)
22. Kamışlı (Elkik)
23. Kavaklı (Marînus)
24. Kavalköy (Qewal)
25. Kaymaklı (Şimunis)
26. Kırıkdağ (Dêz)
27. Konak (Koçanis)
28. Oğul (Tal)
29. Olgunlar (Çemka)
30. Otluca (Xenanis)
31. Ördekli (Kotranis)
32. Pınarca (Baleka)
33. Sarıtaş (Zereni)
34. Taşbaşı (Kelêtan)
35. Üzümcü (Dizê)
36. Yoncalı (Anîtos)

== Population ==
Population history of the district from 2007 to 2023:

Population
Year	Pop.	±%
2007	77,926	—
2010	79,576	+2.1%
2015	79,562	−0.0%
2020	78,516	−1.3%
2023	77,273	−1.6%
