= Kadıköy, Kiğı =

Village in Bingöl Province, Turkey

Kadıköy
- Village
- Location within Turkey
- Coordinates: 39.290°N 40.324°E
- Country: Turkey
- Province: Bingöl
- District: Kiğı
- Population (2021): 62
- Time zone: UTC+3 (TRT)

Kadıköy (Kurdish: Kadi) is a village in the Kiğı District, Bingöl Province, Turkey. The village is populated by Kurds of the Xiran tribe and had a population of 62 in 2021.
