= Boybeyi, Hakkâri =

Village in Hakkari Province, Turkey

Boybeyi
- Village
- Location within Turkey
- Coordinates: 37.789°N 44.058°E
- Country: Turkey
- Province: Hakkâri
- District: Hakkâri
- Population (2023): 226
- Time zone: UTC+3 (TRT)

Boybeyi (Kurdish: Asingiran) is a village in the central district of Hakkâri Province in Turkey. The village is populated by Kurds of the Pinyanişî tribe and had a population of 226 in 2023.

The two hamlets of Musahanı (Xana Musa) and Yeşilbulak (Kanîkezê) are attached to Boybeyi.

== Etymology ==
The name Asingiran means 'heavy iron' in Kurdish.

== Population ==
Population history from 1997 to 2023:

Population
Year	Pop.	±%
1997	420	—
2007	373	−11.2%
2012	369	−1.1%
2017	296	−19.8%
2022	242	−18.2%
2023	226	−6.6%
