= Ördekli, Hakkâri =

Village in Hakkari Province, Turkey

Ördekli
- Village
- Location within Turkey
- Coordinates: 37.743°N 43.747°E
- Country: Turkey
- Province: Hakkâri
- District: Hakkâri
- Population (2023): 144
- Time zone: UTC+3 (TRT)

Ördekli (Kurdish: Kotranis, Syriac: Qōṭrānīs) is a village in the central district of Hakkâri Province in Turkey. The village is populated by Kurds of the Geravî tribe and had a population of 144 in 2023. The five hamlets of Akar, Doğanca (Orîte, Ōret), İlik (Ilkê), Oyaca, Subaşı (Xarusan), Tepeli (Xerdelanis, Ḥardālānīs) and Yuvacık (Pixînk) are attached to the village.

== History ==
The village was populated by 25 Assyrian families in 1850 and 24 families in 1877.

The village was depopulated in the 1990s during the Kurdish–Turkish conflict.

== Population ==
Population history from 1997 to 2023:

Population
| Year | Pop. | ±% |
|---|---|---|
| 1997 | 95 | — |
| 2007 | 121 | +27.4% |
| 2012 | 115 | −5.0% |
| 2017 | 87 | −24.3% |
| 2022 | 130 | +49.4% |
| 2023 | 144 | +10.8% |
