= Sarıtaş, Hakkâri =

Village in Hakkari Province, Turkey

Sarıtaş
- Village
- Location within Turkey
- Coordinates: 37.771°N 44.078°E
- Country: Turkey
- Province: Hakkâri
- District: Hakkâri
- Population (2023): 235
- Time zone: UTC+3 (TRT)

Sarıtaş (Kurdish: Zereni) is a village in the central district of Hakkâri Province in Turkey. The village is populated by Kurds of the Pinyanişî tribe and had a population of 235 in 2023.

The hamlet of Kürüm (Kurum) is attached to Sarıtaş.

== Population ==
Population
Year	Pop.	±%
2007	274	—
2012	287	+4.7%
2017	237	−17.4%
2023	235	−0.8%
Source: TÜİK
