= Demirtaş, Hakkâri =

Village in Hakkari Province, Turkey

Demirtaş
- Village
- Location within Turkey
- Coordinates: 37.729°N 43.970°E
- Country: Turkey
- Province: Hakkâri
- District: Hakkâri
- Population (2023): 549
- Time zone: UTC+3 (TRT)

Demirtaş (Kurdish: Evranis) is a village in the central district of Hakkâri Province in Turkey. The village is populated by Kurds of different tribal composition and had a population of 549 in 2023.

The hamlets of Kuşlu (Karinç), Oluklu (Eremyan), Örencik (Xirabe) and Yağmurlu (Hisane) are attached to Demirtaş.

Tribes that reside in Demirtaş include Oramar and Pinyanişî.

== Population ==
Population history from 1997 to 2023:

Population
Year	Pop.	±%
1997	488	—
2007	713	+46.1%
2012	734	+2.9%
2017	659	−10.2%
2022	580	−12.0%
2023	549	−5.3%
