= Taşbaşı, Hakkâri =

Village in Hakkari Province, Turkey

Taşbaşı
- Village
- Location within Turkey
- Coordinates: 37.398°N 43.493°E
- Country: Turkey
- Province: Hakkâri
- District: Hakkâri
- Population (2023): 678
- Time zone: UTC+3 (TRT)

Taşbaşı (Kurdish: Kelêtan) is a village in the central district of Hakkâri Province in Turkey. The village is populated by Kurds of the Mamxûran tribe and had a population of 678 in 2023.

The hamlet of İğdeli (Îde) is attached to Taşbaşı.

== History ==
The village was attached to Çukurca District until 1993.

== Population ==
Population history from 1997 to 2023:

Population
Year	Pop.	±%
1997	1,085	—
2007	1,215	+12.0%
2012	1,312	+8.0%
2017	1,032	−21.3%
2022	684	−33.7%
2023	678	−0.9%
