= Dibekli, Yüksekova =

Village in Hakkari Province, Turkey

Dibekli
- Village
- Location within Turkey
- Coordinates: 37.67°N 44.093°E
- Country: Turkey
- Province: Hakkâri
- District: Yüksekova
- Population (2023): 350
- Time zone: UTC+3 (TRT)

Dibekli (Kurdish: Awerd, Syriac: Āwert) is a village in the Yüksekova District of Hakkâri Province in Turkey. The village had a population of 350 in 2023.

The hamlet of Odabaşı (Dedîn) is attached to the village.

== History ==
The village was populated by 16 Assyrian families in 1850 and 10 families in 1877.

== Population ==
Population history from 1997 to 2023:

Population
Year	Pop.	±%
1997	335	—
2007	401	+19.7%
2012	410	+2.2%
2017	393	−4.1%
2022	357	−9.2%
2023	350	−2.0%
