= Çanaklı, Hakkâri =

Village in Hakkari Province, Turkey

Çanaklı
- Village
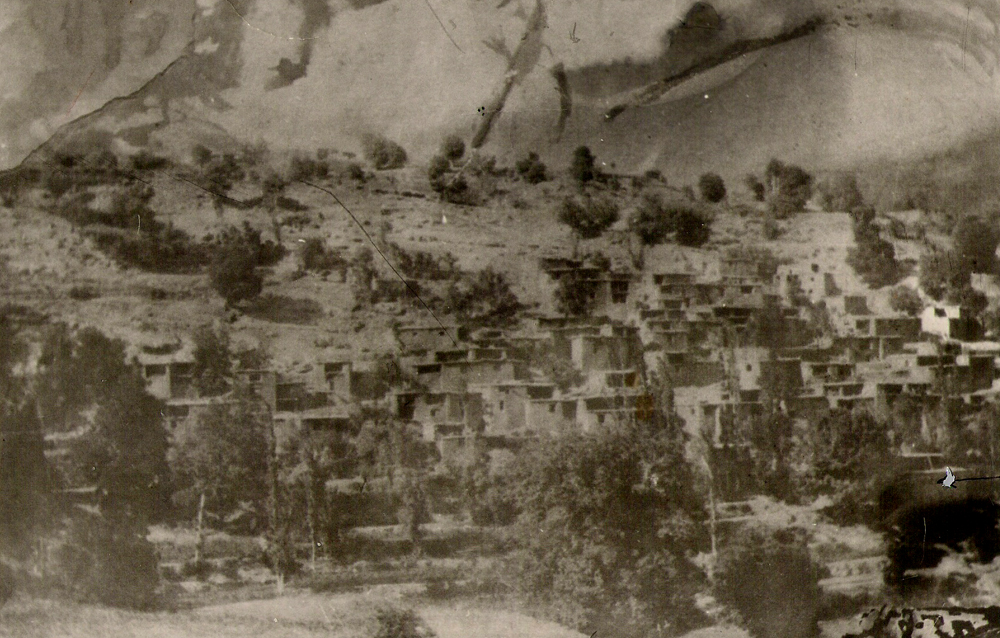
- Old image of village

- Location within Turkey
- Coordinates: 37.427°N 43.874°E
- Country: Turkey
- Province: Hakkâri
- District: Hakkâri
- Population (2023): 643
- Time zone: UTC+3 (TRT)

Çanaklı (Kurdish: Baz, Syriac: ܒܙ, romanized: Baz) is a village in the central district of Hakkâri Province in Turkey. The village is populated by Kurds of the Jirkî tribe and had a population of 643 in 2023.

The hamlets of Alandüz (Alantos) and Şenocak (Şawîrte) are attached to Çanaklı.

== Population ==
Population history from 1997 to 2023:

Population
| Year | Pop. | ±% |
|---|---|---|
| 1997 | 462 | — |
| 2007 | 649 | +40.5% |
| 2012 | 674 | +3.9% |
| 2017 | 658 | −2.4% |
| 2022 | 652 | −0.9% |
| 2023 | 643 | −1.4% |
