= Demirdöş, Kiğı =

Village in Bingöl Province, Turkey

Demirdöş
- Village
- Location within Turkey
- Coordinates: 39.300°N 40.162°E
- Country: Turkey
- Province: Bingöl
- District: Kiğı
- Population (2021): 9
- Time zone: UTC+3 (TRT)

Demirdöş (also known as Demirtaş, Kurdish: Tirkan) is a village in the Kiğı District, Bingöl Province, Turkey. The village is populated by Kurds of Bilice tribe and had a population of 9 in 2021.

The hamlet of Tophane is attached to the village.
