= Akbulut, Hakkâri =

Village in Hakkari Province, Turkey

Akbulut
- Village
- Location within Turkey
- Coordinates: 37.709°N 43.869°E
- Country: Turkey
- Province: Hakkâri
- District: Hakkâri
- Population (2023): 329
- Time zone: UTC+3 (TRT)

Akbulut (Kurdish: Goranis, Syriac: Qūrānīs) is a village in the central district of Hakkâri Province in Turkey. The village is populated by Kurds of the Mamxûran tribe and had a population of 329 in 2023.

The two hamlets of Aydın (Têrkûnis) and Demirli (Rezan) are attached to Akbulut.

== History ==
The village was populated by 20 Assyrian families in 1850 and 9 families in 1877.

== Population ==
Population history from 1997 to 2023:

Population
Year	Pop.	±%
1997	85	—
2007	284	+234.1%
2012	386	+35.9%
2017	335	−13.2%
2022	302	−9.9%
2023	329	+8.9%
