= Olgunlar, Hakkâri =

Village in Hakkari Province, Turkey

Olgunlar
- Village
- Location within Turkey
- Coordinates: 37.476°N 43.528°E
- Country: Turkey
- Province: Hakkâri
- District: Hakkâri
- Population (2023): 195
- Time zone: UTC+3 (TRT)

Olgunlar (Kurdish: Çemkan) is a village in the central district of Hakkâri Province in Turkey. The village is populated by Kurds of the Kaşuran tribe and had a population of 195 in 2023.

The hamlets of Aşağıdereli (Çemkana jêrî), Stokan (Stoka) and Yukarıdereli (Çemkana jorî) are attached to Olgunlar.

== Population ==
Population history from 2007 to 2023:

Population
| Year | Pop. | ±% |
|---|---|---|
| 2007 | 284 | — |
| 2012 | 330 | +16.2% |
| 2017 | 280 | −15.2% |
| 2022 | 202 | −27.9% |
| 2023 | 195 | −3.5% |
