= Çaltıkoru, Hakkâri =

Village in Hakkari Province, Turkey

Çaltıkoru
- Village
- Location within Turkey
- Coordinates: 37.731°N 43.822°E
- Country: Turkey
- Province: Hakkâri
- District: Hakkâri
- Population (2023): 71
- Time zone: UTC+3 (TRT)

Çaltıkoru (Kurdish: Sêwînê, Syriac: Sīwīne) is a village in the central district of Hakkâri Province in Turkey. The village is populated by Kurds of the Mamxûran tribe and had a population of 71 in 2023.

The hamlets of Dikmen, Gümüşlü, Koçlu and Yukarıköy (Hergêl) are attached to the village.

== History ==
The village was populated by 30 Assyrian families in 1850 and 20 families in 1877.

== Population ==
Population history from 1997 to 2023:

Population
Year	Pop.	±%
1997	0	—
2007	56	—
2012	60	+7.1%
2017	75	+25.0%
2022	37	−50.7%
2023	71	+91.9%
