= Jelek, Iraq =

Jelek
- Village
- Location in Iraq Jelek (Iraqi Kurdistan)
- Coordinates: Lower Jelek (Jelek Nasara); 37°15′1″N 43°11′2″E; Upper Jelek (Jelek Islam); 37.231111°N 43.1675°E
- Country: Iraq
- Region: Kurdistan Region
- Governorate: Dohuk Governorate
- District: Amadiya District
- Sub-district: Kani Masi

Jelek (Note: Alternatively transliterated as Challik, Chelok, Chalke, or Chelki.) (Syriac: ܟ̰ܠܟ, Kurdish: چه‌لکێ, romanized: Çelkê) is a village in Dohuk Governorate in Kurdistan Region, Iraq. It is located by the Little Khabur river in the district of Amadiya and the historical region of Barwari.

The village is divided into upper and lower sections. In the village, there is a church of Mart Shmuni, and there was formerly a church of Mar Mushe.

== History ==
The church of Mar Mushe was first constructed in 1100 AD. In 1850, 40-60 Assyrian families inhabited Jelek, and were served by a single priest and the church of Mar Mushe, which was restored in 1860. Amidst the Assyrian genocide in the First World War, Jelek was attacked by Turks and Kurds, and most of the village's population fled to Urmia in Iran in 1915-1916. Whilst in Iran, half of those who had fled died of wounds and hypothermia. Afterwards, Assyrian refugees from Lower Tiyari in Turkey were resettled at Jelek, and the village had a population of 210 people by 1933, in which year it was destroyed by the Iraqi Army during the Simele massacre. The village recovered, and 55 families resided there in 1938.

The Iraqi census of 1957 recorded 519 inhabitants, and at the onset of the First Iraqi–Kurdish War in 1961, 400 families in 200 households resided at Jelek. The war spurred the villagers to flee and seek refuge elsewhere, but most returned upon the war's end in 1970, at which time the village mukhtar (headman) Hermiz Oshana was assassinated. Jelek was completely destroyed by the Iraqi army in 1978, including the church of Mar Mushe and village school, due to its proximity to the Iraq–Turkey border, and its population of c. 100 families was forcibly resettled at Bersevi near Zakho.

In the aftermath of the 1991 uprisings in Iraq, 10 Assyrian families returned to Jelek. In the following year, it was reported that Kurds from neighbouring villages had illegally seized 11 dunams of land from the villagers, and had built 80 houses on the villagers' land. The Supreme Committee of Christian Affairs constructed 62 houses (47 at Lower Jelek, 15 at Upper Jelek), a school, a hall, and a church at Jelek, however, as Assyrians had refused to return there due to a lack of economic opportunities, Upper Jelek was seized and settled by Kurds, which is now known as Jelek Islam, whilst Lower Jelek is named as Jelek Nasara.

The Assyrians of Lower Jelek continued to suffer from persecution as Kurds set ablaze the former's spindar trees in March 2004, causing damage estimated at over $2 million, and an arson attack by Kurds from the neighbouring village of Kesta on the villagers' crops on 7 July 2009 damaged 75% of their land, including several houses. In early 2009, one family of six displaced Assyrians resided at Lower Jelek. In 2012, Jelek Nasara was inhabited by 50 adherents of the Assyrian Church of the East. The village was reportedly targeted by Turkish airstrikes in June 2020 during Operation Tiger Claw, as part of the Kurdish–Turkish conflict.

== Bibliography ==
- Donabed, Sargon George (2010). Iraq and the Assyrian Unimagining: Illuminating Scaled Suffering and a Hierarchy of Genocide from Simele to Anfal (PDF).
- Donabed, Sargon George (2015). Reforging a Forgotten History: Iraq and the Assyrians in the Twentieth Century. Edinburgh University Press.
- Eshoo, Majed (2004). The Fate Of Assyrian Villages Annexed To Today's Dohuk Governorate In Iraq And The Conditions In These Villages Following The Establishment Of The Iraqi State In 1921 (PDF). Translated by Mary Challita.
- KRSO (2009), "2009 - ناوی پاریزگا. يه که کارگيرييه كانی پاریزگاكانی هه ریمی کوردستان" (PDF), Kurdistan Region Statistics Office (KRSO) (in Kurdish), pp. 1–179
- Yacoub, Joseph (2016). Year of the Sword: The Assyrian Christian Genocide, A History. Translated by James Ferguson. Oxford University Press.
