= Munzur Çem =

Kurdish writer (1945–2022)

Munzur Çem (born Hüseyin Beysülen; 1945 – 11 December 2022) was a Kurdish writer and journalist who published a number of publications on various topics pertaining to Kurds. His work includes a collection of interviews of survivors and descendants of the Dersim massacre conducted in 1999.

== Biography ==
Çem was born in Kiğı in 1945 and went to school in Nazımiye. He graduated as a health officer in 1971. During his education, he published newspaper articles and in school and later for a Kurdish newspaper in Ankara. In 1977, Çem founded the newspaper Roja Welat but the ban on the Kurdish language impeded him from publishing. When the newspaper Dengê Komkarî was founded in 1979 by Kurdish migrants in Germany, Çem became a contributor from the beginning. Çem later moved to Sweden in 1984.

== Bibliography ==
=== Books ===
- Türkiye Kürdistanı: Ekonomik ve Sosyal Yapı, Özgürlük Yolu Yayınları, 1985
- Gülümse ey Dersim, vol. 1, Özgürlük Yolu Yayınları, 1990
- Gülümse ey Dersim, vol. 2, Özgürlük Yolu Yayınları, 1991
- Dünü ve bugünüyle "gerikalmışlık" sorunu, Öz-Ge Yayınları, 1991
- Hotay Serra Usivê Qurzkizî, Roja Nû, 1992
- Gülümse ey Dersim, vol. 3, Özgürlük Yolu Yayınları, 1993
- Tayê Kilamê Dêrsimî, 1993
- Ferheng: Kurdî-Tirkî (Zazakî), 1994
- Ormanın Dili (1 ed.), Peri Yayınları, 1996
- İsyana Çağrı, Peri Yayınları, 1996
- Ekmeği de Yaktılar, Pencînar Yayınları, 1997
- Luye Be Biza Kole ra, Weşanên Komkar, 1998
- Kulê 38î, Weşanên Komkar, 1998
- Dersim'de Alevilik, Peri Yayınları, 1999
- Tanıkların Diliyle Dersim 38, Peri Yayınları, 1999
- The Voice of the Forest, KOMKAR Publications, 2000
- Türkçe Açıklamalı Kirmancca (Zazaca) Gramer, Weşanên Deng, 2003
- Ormanın Dili (2 ed.), Peri Yayınları, 2004
- Antolojîyê Hîkayanê Kirmanckî (Zazakî), Weqfa kurdî ya kulturî li Stockholmê, 2005
- Hewnê Newroze, Weşanxaneyê Vateyî, 2005
- Gula Çemê Pêrre, Weşanxaneyê Vateyî, 2007
- Ormanın Dili (3 ed.), Peri Yayınları, 2008
- Dêrsim Merkezli Kürt Aleviliği (Etnisite, Dini İnanç, Kültür ve Direniş), Weşanxaneye Vateyî, 2009
- Hewraman - Dersim Sırrı, İsmail Beşikci Vakfı, 2017
- Nuşteyî, Weşanxaneye Vateyî, 2019
- Veng û Hesreta Herdê Dewrêşî, Weşanxaneye Vateyî, 2020
- Yayınlanmış Yazılar I / Dergi, Gazete Yazıları, Babek Yayınları, 2020
- Yayınlanmış Yazılar II / İnternet Yazıları, Babek Yayınları, 2020
- Yayınlanmış Yazılar III / Polemik Yazıları, Babek Yayınları, 2020
- Kiğı'dan Berlin'e Anılar I, Deng Yayınları, 2021

=== Periodical articles ===
- Aytar, Osman; Dağdeviren, Nedim; Kutlay, Nacî; Lewendî, Mahmûd; Metê, Hesenê; Soran, Zinar, eds. (1995), "No kî ma ra wo", Çira, vol. 1, pp. 89–94
- Aytar, Osman; Dağdeviren, Nedim; Kutlay, Nacî; Lewendî, Mahmûd; Metê, Hesenê; Soran, Zinar, eds. (1995), "Kirmanckî (Zazakî) de nêr û mayik", Çira, vol. 1, no. 2, pp. 105–112
- Aytar, Osman; Alakom, Rohat; Cewerî, Firat; Lewendî, Mahmûd; Soran, Zinar, eds. (1996), "Usên ve bakilî ra", Çira, vol. 2, no. 5, pp. 63–67
- Aytar, Osman; Alakom, Rohat; Cewerî, Firat; Lewendî, Mahmûd; Soran, Zinar, eds. (1996), "Kirmanckî (fekê Dêrsimî) de zuhûmariye û zafhûmariye", Çira, vol. 2, no. 6, pp. 64–70
- Diljen, Haydar; Espar, J. Îhsan; Uzun, Mehmet; Malmîsanij, Mehemed; Gundogan, Cemîl, eds. (1997), "Roze be roze pê xapit, heta ke ma qir kerdîme", Vate, vol. 1, pp. 5–20
- Diljen, Haydar; Espar, J. Îhsan; Uzun, Mehmet; Malmîsanij, Mehemed; Gundogan, Cemîl, eds. (1997), "Serra 60 ya sarewedardena Dêrsimî ser o: "Ez ver va Dismenî çok ronênan"", Vate, vol. 2, pp. 13–22
- Diljen, Haydar; Espar, J. Îhsan; Uzun, Mehmet; Malmîsanij, Mehemed; Gundogan, Cemîl, eds. (1997), "Tertelê 38i ra ma ki bara xo gurete", Vate, vol. 3, pp. 35–49
- Diljen, Haydar; Espar, J. Îhsan; Uzun, Mehmet; Malmîsanij, Mehemed; Gundogan, Cemîl, eds. (1998), "Vîlikê verê vare", Vate, vol. 4, pp. 66–74
- Diljen, Haydar; Espar, J. Îhsan; Uzun, Mehmet; Malmîsanij, Mehemed, eds. (1998), "Komara Tirkîya û Dêrsim", Vate, vol. 6, pp. 44–56
- Diljen, Haydar; Espar, J. Îhsan; Uzun, Mehmet; Malmîsanij, Mehemed, eds. (1999), "Hewnê Newrozê", Vate, vol. 7, pp. 49–54
- Diljen, Haydar; Espar, J. Îhsan; Uzun, Mehmet; Malmîsanij, Mehemed, eds. (1999), "Şahan Axa", Vate, vol. 9, pp. 74–78
- Diljen, Haydar; Espar, J. Îhsan; Uzun, Mehmet; Malmîsanij, Mehemed, eds. (2000), "Qemer Axayê Usivan", Vate, vol. 11, pp. 38–42
- Diljen, Haydar; Espar, J. Îhsan; Uzun, Mehmet; Malmîsanij, Mehemed, eds. (2000), "Fekê Dêrsimî de Antişê Karan", Vate, vol. 12, pp. 17–31
- Diljen, Haydar; Espar, J. Îhsan; Uzun, Mehmet; Malmîsanij, Mehemed, eds. (2000), "Xeca Xidirî: Dewa ma kerde xan-xirave", Vate, vol. 13, pp. 52–59
- Diljen, Haydar; Espar, J. Îhsan; Uzun, Mehmet; Malmîsanij, Mehemed, eds. (2000), "Karê ziwan û kulture ma de gamêda newîye: ÎKK", Vate, vol. 13, pp. 100–102
- Diljen, Haydar; Espar, J. Îhsan; Uzun, Mehmet; Malmîsanij, Mehemed, eds. (2001), "Şaîro Namdar Saydar", Vate, vol. 14, pp. 25–35
- Diljen, Haydar; Espar, J. Îhsan; Uzun, Mehmet; Malmîsanij, Mehemed, eds. (2002), "Di şêrê Kurdîstanî - Alîşêr û Zerîfa", Vate, vol. 16, pp. 17–21
- Diljen, Haydar; Espar, J. Îhsan; Uzun, Mehmet; Malmîsanij, Mehemed, eds. (2002), "Di şêrê Kurdîstanî - Alîşêr û Zerîfa II", Vate, vol. 17, pp. 20–25
- Diljen, Haydar; Espar, J. Îhsan; Uzun, Mehmet; Malmîsanij, Mehemed, eds. (2003), "Nê miletê mezlumî se kerdîvî?", Vate, vol. 19, pp. 4–16
- Diljen, Haydar; Espar, J. Îhsan; Uzun, Mehmet; Malmîsanij, Mehemed, eds. (2003), "Doktorê Ma", Vate, vol. 21
- "Xoverdayîşê kurdan ê seserra 20î de cayê kirmancan", Tîroj, vol. 2, no. 8, 2004
- Diljen, Haydar; Espar, J. Îhsan; Uzun, Mehmet; Malmîsanij, Mehemed, eds. (2005), "Demê Begîya Çemîşgezekî de Dêrsim de Nasnameyo Etnîk", Vate, vol. 23, pp. 57–67
- Malmîsanij, Mehemed; Uzun, Mehmet; Espar, J. Îhsan, eds. (2005), "Derheqê Ferhengê H. Çakmakî de", Vate, vol. 24, pp. 108–115
- Malmîsanij, Mehemed; Uzun, Mehmet; Espar, J. Îhsan, eds. (2007), "Zîyara Conage Ser o Çend Çekuyî", Vate, vol. 29, pp. 110–111
- Malmîsanij, Mehemed; Uzun, Mehmet; Espar, J. Îhsan, eds. (2008), "Pekîn de Hefteyê", Vate, vol. 31, pp. 77–90
- Bedîrxan, Serdar; Gunduz, Deniz; Çem, Munzur, eds. (2011), "Welatê Kengurîyan de", Vate, vol. 35, pp. 30–40
- Bedîrxan, Serdar; Gunduz, Deniz; Çem, Munzur, eds. (2011), "Jenosîdê 1937-38i Jenosîdêde Plankerde yo", Vate, vol. 36, pp. 50–57
- Bedîrxan, Serdar; Gunduz, Deniz; Çem, Munzur, eds. (2011), "Ziwan, Asîmîlasyon û Xoverdayîş", Vate, vol. 37
- Bedîrxan, Serdar; Gunduz, Deniz; Çem, Munzur, eds. (2012), "Folklor û Bawerîya Kurdanê Dêrsimî ra", Vate, vol. 38
- "Neticeya xebata kombiyayişi ser o", Vate, vol. 73, pp. 103–106, 2022
