= Armutdüzü, Yüksekova =

Village in Hakkari Province, Turkey

Armutdüzü
- Village
- Location within Turkey
- Coordinates: 37.680°N 43.958°E
- Country: Turkey
- Province: Hakkâri
- District: Yüksekova
- Population (2023): 418
- Time zone: UTC+3 (TRT)

Armutdüzü (Kurdish: Metolanis) is a village in Yüksekova District in Hakkâri Province in Turkey. The village is populated by Kurds of the Pinyanişî tribe and had a population of 418 in 2023.

The ten hamlets of Aktoprak (Axespî), Arpalı (Mekanis), Damlacık (Dêrîk), Erdal, Erikli (Kavlimelebayî), Korunak (Helişik), Şahince (Niziran), Yağmurlu (Veriskî) and Yuvalı (Sekran) are all attached to Armutdüzü.

== Population ==
Population history from 1997 to 2023:

Population
Year	Pop.	±%
1997	537	—
2007	466	−13.2%
2012	545	+17.0%
2017	416	−23.7%
2022	428	+2.9%
2023	418	−2.3%
