= Kaymaklı, Hakkâri =

Village in Hakkari Province, Turkey

Kaymaklı
- Village
- Location within Turkey
- Coordinates: 37.742°N 43.799°E
- Country: Turkey
- Province: Hakkâri
- District: Hakkâri
- Population (2023): 170
- Time zone: UTC+3 (TRT)

Kaymaklı (Kurdish: Şimunis, Syriac: Shmūnīnīs) is a village in the central district of Hakkâri Province in Turkey. The village had a population of 170 in 2023.

The hamlet of Sütlüce (Ewkanis) is attached to Kaymaklı.

== History ==
The village was populated by 20 Assyrian families in 1850 and 5 families in 1877.

== Population ==
Population history from 1997 to 2023:

Population
Year	Pop.	±%
1997	0	—
2007	176	—
2012	153	−13.1%
2017	197	+28.8%
2022	170	−13.7%
2023	170	+0.0%
