= Kamışlı, Hakkâri =

Village in Hakkari Province, Turkey

Kamışlı
- Village
- Location within Turkey
- Coordinates: 37.560°N 43.518°E
- Country: Turkey
- Province: Hakkâri
- District: Hakkâri
- Population (2023): 90
- Time zone: UTC+3 (TRT)

Kamışlı (Kurdish: Elkik) is a village in the central district of Hakkâri Province in Turkey. The village is populated by Kurds of the Pinyanişî tribe and had a population of 90 in 2023.

== Population ==
Population history from 2007 to 2023:

Population
| Year | Pop. | ±% |
|---|---|---|
| 2007 | 75 | — |
| 2012 | 73 | −2.7% |
| 2017 | 77 | +5.5% |
| 2022 | 86 | +11.7% |
| 2023 | 90 | +4.7% |
