= Kızılçubuk, Karlıova =

Village in Bingöl Province, Turkey

Kızılçubuk
- Village
- Location within Turkey
- Coordinates: 39.394°N 40.860°E
- Country: Turkey
- Province: Bingöl
- District: Karlıova
- Population (2021): 225
- Time zone: UTC+3 (TRT)

Kızılçubuk (Kurdish: Qizil Çubuk) is a village in the Karlıova District, Bingöl Province, Turkey. The village is populated by Kurds of the Cibran tribe and had a population of 225 in 2021.
