= Ortaköy, Karlıova =

Village in Bingöl Province, Turkey

Ortaköy
- Village
- Location within Turkey
- Coordinates: 39.407°N 40.890°E
- Country: Turkey
- Province: Bingöl
- District: Karlıova
- Population (2021): 151
- Time zone: UTC+3 (TRT)

Ortaköy (Kurdish: Dewamîyanîn) is a village in the Karlıova District, Bingöl Province, Turkey. The village is populated by Kurds of the Maksudan tribe and had a population of 151 in 2021.
