= Soğukpınar, Karlıova =

Village in Bingöl Province, Turkey

Soğukpınar
- Village
- Location within Turkey
- Coordinates: 39.210°N 40.850°E
- Country: Turkey
- Province: Bingöl
- District: Karlıova
- Population (2021): 85
- Time zone: UTC+3 (TRT)

Soğukpınar (Kurdish: Gamêşan) is a village in the Karlıova District, Bingöl Province, Turkey. The village is populated by Kurds of the Hormek tribe and had a population of 85 in 2021.

The hamlet of Binkoz is attached to the village.
