= Tuzluca, Karlıova =

Village in Bingöl Province, Turkey

Tuzluca
- Village
- Location within Turkey
- Coordinates: 39.368°N 41.054°E
- Country: Turkey
- Province: Bingöl
- District: Karlıova
- Population (2021): 168
- Time zone: UTC+3 (TRT)

Tuzluca (Kurdish: Şorika corîn) is a village in the Karlıova District, Bingöl Province, Turkey. The village is populated by Kurds of the Hormek tribe and had a population of 168 in 2021.

The hamlet of Çiçekpınarı is attached to the village.
