= Göynük, Karlıova =

Village in Bingöl Province, Turkey

Göynük
- Village
- Location within Turkey
- Coordinates: 39.145°N 40.882°E
- Country: Turkey
- Province: Bingöl
- District: Karlıova
- Population (2021): 391
- Time zone: UTC+3 (TRT)

Göynük (Kurdish: Gonik, Oxnût, Armenian: Օղնուտ, romanized: Oghnoud, Oghnut, Oghnat, Gönük) is a village in the Karlıova District, Bingöl Province, Turkey. The village is populated by Kurds of the Cibran tribe and had a population of 391 in 2021.

Oghnut (Oghnad) had 800 Armenians, 74 houses, St. Gevorg Church, one school before the Armenian genocide.
