= Çatak, Karlıova =

Village in Bingöl Province, Turkey

Çatak
- Village
- Location within Turkey
- Coordinates: 39.164°N 41.154°E
- Country: Turkey
- Province: Bingöl
- District: Karlıova
- Population (2021): 234
- Time zone: UTC+3 (TRT)

Çatak (Kurdish: Çeteq) is a village in the Karlıova District, Bingöl Province, Turkey. The village is populated by Kurds of the Maksudan tribe and had a population of 234 in 2021.
