= Kargapazarı, Karlıova =

Village in Bingöl Province, Turkey

Kargapazarı
- Village
- Location within Turkey
- Coordinates: 39.312°N 41.097°E
- Country: Turkey
- Province: Bingöl
- District: Karlıova
- Population (2021): 1,318
- Time zone: UTC+3 (TRT)

Kargapazarı (Kurdish: Qerxe Pazar) is a village in the Karlıova District, Bingöl Province, Turkey. The village is populated by Kurds of the Cibran tribe and had a population of 1,318 in 2021.
