= Sarıkuşak, Karlıova =

Village in Bingöl Province, Turkey

Sarıkuşak
- Village
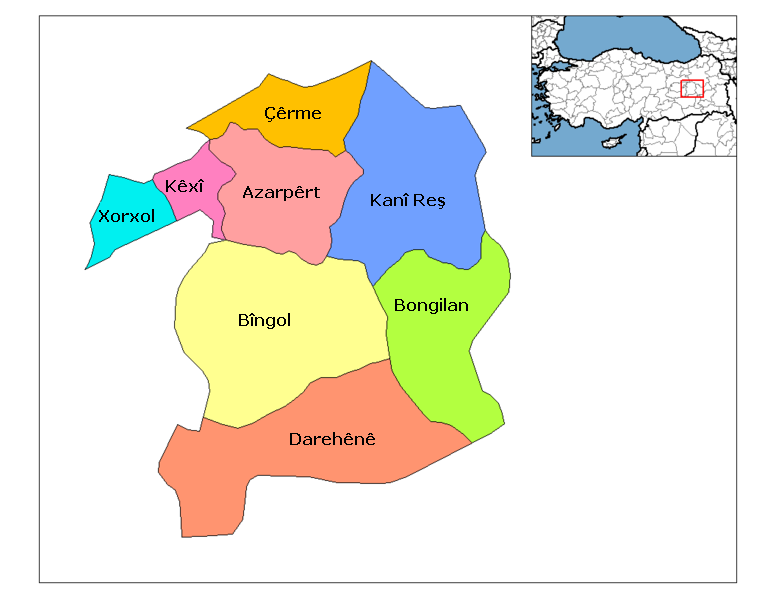
- Map of the districts of the Turkish province of Bîngol

- Location within Turkey
- Coordinates: 39.405°N 40.834°E
- Country: Turkey
- Province: Bingöl
- District: Karlıova
- Population (2021): 160
- Time zone: UTC+3 (TRT)

Sarıkuşak (Kurdish: Şarûg) is a village in the Karlıova District, Bingöl Province, Turkey. The village is populated by Kurds of the Cibran tribe and had a population of 160 in 2021.
