= Serpmekaya, Karlıova =

Village in Bingöl Province, Turkey

Hasanova
- Village
- Location within Turkey
- Coordinates: 39.260°N 41.047°E
- Country: Turkey
- Province: Bingöl
- District: Karlıova
- Population (2021): 612
- Time zone: UTC+3 (TRT)

Serpmekaya (Kurdish: Alpiran, Armenian: Alipiran, Alipunar, Alipunarköy) is a village in the Karlıova District, Bingöl Province, Turkey. The village is populated by Kurds of the Cibran tribe and had a population of 612 in 2021.

The hamlets of Harmanlı and Yalnızlar are attached to the village.

Ali-Piran had 150 Armenians, 13 houses, one church (Surb Astvatsatsin, Holy Mother of God), 2 monasteries, and one school before the Armenian genocide.
