= Harmantepe, Karlıova =

Village in Bingöl Province, Turkey

Harmantepe
- Village
- Location within Turkey
- Coordinates: 39.424°N 40.944°E
- Country: Turkey
- Province: Bingöl
- District: Karlıova
- Population (2021): 89
- Time zone: UTC+3 (TRT)

Harmantepe (Kurdish: Navro) is a village in the Karlıova District, Bingöl Province, Turkey. The village is populated by Kurds of the Maksudan tribe and had a population of 89 in 2021.

The hamlet of Kur is attached to the village.
