= Yiğitler, Karlıova =

Village in Bingöl Province, Turkey

Yiğitler
- Village
- Location within Turkey
- Coordinates: 39.183°N 40.792°E
- Country: Turkey
- Province: Bingöl
- District: Karlıova
- Population (2021): 1,310
- Time zone: UTC+3 (TRT)

Yiğitler (Kurdish: Saxnîs) is a village in the Karlıova District, Bingöl Province, Turkey. The village is populated by Kurds of the Şüküran tribe and had a population of 1,310 in 2021.

The hamlets of Çatal, Gülabi and Mezracık is attached to the village.
