= Kalencik, Karlıova =

Village in Bingöl Province, Turkey

Kalencik
- Village
- Location within Turkey
- Coordinates: 39.154°N 40.889°E
- Country: Turkey
- Province: Bingöl
- District: Karlıova
- Population (2021): 399
- Time zone: UTC+3 (TRT)

Kalencik (Kurdish: Qalencuk) is a village in the Karlıova District, Bingöl Province, Turkey. The village is populated by Kurds and had a population of 399 in 2021.
