= Yukarıyağmurlu, Karlıova =

Village in Bingöl Province, Turkey

Yukarıyağmurlu
- Village
- Location within Turkey
- Coordinates: 39.201°N 40.772°E
- Country: Turkey
- Province: Bingöl
- District: Karlıova
- Population (2021): 366
- Time zone: UTC+3 (TRT)

Yukarıyağmurlu (Kurdish: Sêvika corin) is a village in the Karlıova District, Bingöl Province, Turkey. The village is populated by Kurds of the Şadiyan tribe and had a population of 366 in 2021.
