= Bahçeköy, Karlıova =

Village in Bingöl Province, Turkey

Bahçeköy
- Village
- Location within Turkey
- Coordinates: 39.215°N 40.906°E
- Country: Turkey
- Province: Bingöl
- District: Karlıova
- Population (2021): 627
- Time zone: UTC+3 (TRT)

Bahçeköy (Kurdish: Baxçe) is a village in the Karlıova District, Bingöl Province, Turkey. The village is populated by Kurds of the Bekiran tribe and had a population of 627 in 2021.
