= Karlıca, Karlıova =

Village in Bingöl Province, Turkey

Karlıca
- Village
- Location within Turkey
- Coordinates: 39.227°N 40.755°E
- Country: Turkey
- Province: Bingöl
- District: Karlıova
- Population (2021): 313
- Time zone: UTC+3 (TRT)

Karlıca (Kurdish: Qirmoçek) is a village in the Karlıova District, Bingöl Province, Turkey. The village is populated by Kurds of the Maksudan tribe and had a population of 313 in 2021.
