= Çiftlikköy, Karlıova =

Village in Bingöl Province, Turkey

Çiftlikköy
- Village
- Location within Turkey
- Coordinates: 39.398°N 41.054°E
- Country: Turkey
- Province: Bingöl
- District: Karlıova
- Population (2021): 55
- Time zone: UTC+3 (TRT)

Çiftlikköy (Kurdish: Çiftlik) is a village in the Karlıova District, Bingöl Province, Turkey. The village is populated by Kurds of the Hormek tribe and had a population of 55 in 2021.
