= Toklular, Karlıova =

Village in Bingöl Province, Turkey

Toklular
- Village
- Location within Turkey
- Coordinates: 39.261°N 40.984°E
- Country: Turkey
- Province: Bingöl
- District: Karlıova
- Population (2021): 1,274
- Time zone: UTC+3 (TRT)

Toklular (Kurdish: Toxlan, Armenian: Թոխլիան, romanized: Tokhlan, Toplar, Tokliyan) is a village in the Karlıova District, Bingöl Province, Turkey. The village is populated by Kurds of the Cibran tribe and had a population of 1,274 in 2021.

Toklan (Takula) had 150 Armenians, 20 houses, one Church (Surb Astvatsatsin / Holy Mother of God) before the Armenian genocide.
