= Dörtyol, Karlıova =

Village in Bingöl Province, Turkey

Dörtyol
- Village
- Location within Turkey
- Coordinates: 39.374°N 40.987°E
- Country: Turkey
- Province: Bingöl
- District: Karlıova
- Population (2021): 318
- Time zone: UTC+3 (TRT)

Dörtyol (Kurdish: Qirtuzî) is a village in the Karlıova District, Bingöl Province, Turkey. The village had a population of 318 in 2021.
