= Yoncalık, Karlıova =

Village in Bingöl Province, Turkey

Yoncalık
- Village
- Location within Turkey
- Coordinates: 39.338°N 41.073°E
- Country: Turkey
- Province: Bingöl
- District: Karlıova
- Population (2021): 153
- Time zone: UTC+3 (TRT)

Yoncalık (Kurdish: Uncelix) is a village in the Karlıova District, Bingöl Province, Turkey. The village is populated by Kurds of the Şadiyan tribe and had a population of 153 in 2021.
