= Geçitli, Karlıova =

Village in Bingöl Province, Turkey

Geçitli
- Village
- Location within Turkey
- Coordinates: 39.415°N 41.077°E
- Country: Turkey
- Province: Bingöl
- District: Karlıova
- Population (2021): 348
- Time zone: UTC+3 (TRT)

Geçitli (Kurdish: Gêlan, Armenian: Գելան, romanized: Gelan, Kilen, Kalan, Gealan, Geylan) is a village in the Karlıova District, Bingöl Province, Turkey. The village is populated by Kurds of the Cibran tribe and had a population of 348 in 2021.

The hamlet of Hesar is attached to the village.

Kilen (Kalan-Jelan) had 200 Armenians, 20 houses, and one church before the Armenian genocide.
