= Bağlıisa, Karlıova =

Village in Bingöl Province, Turkey

Bağlıisa
- Village
- Location within Turkey
- Coordinates: 39.130°N 41.185°E
- Country: Turkey
- Province: Bingöl
- District: Karlıova
- Population (2021): 1,072
- Time zone: UTC+3 (TRT)

Bağlıisa (Kurdish: Baxlu) is a village in the Karlıova District, Bingöl Province, Turkey. The village is populated by Kurds of the Cibran and Ziktî tribes and had a population of 1,072 in 2021.

The hamlets of Çiçekli, Horhor, Morkoyun and Ulukapı are attached to the village.
