= Kaynarpınar, Karlıova =

Village in Bingöl Province, Turkey

Kaynarpınar
- Village
- Location within Turkey
- Coordinates: 39.379°N 40.764°E
- Country: Turkey
- Province: Bingöl
- District: Karlıova
- Population (2021): 174
- Time zone: UTC+3 (TRT)

Kaynarpınar (Kurdish: Liçik) is a village in the Karlıova District, Bingöl Province, Turkey. The village is populated by Kurds of the Hormek tribe and had a population of 174 in 2021.
