= Ilıpınar, Karlıova =

Village in Bingöl Province, Turkey

Ilıpınar
- Village
- Location within Turkey
- Coordinates: 39°22′30″N 40°56′20″E
- Country: Turkey
- Province: Bingöl
- District: Karlıova
- Population (2021): 215
- Time zone: UTC+3 (TRT)

Ilıpınar (Kurdish: Çêrmûk) is a village in the Karlıova District, Bingöl Province, Turkey. The village is populated by Kurds of the Şadiyan tribe and had a population of 215 in 2021.
