= Karlıova District =

District of Bingöl Province, Turkey

- District
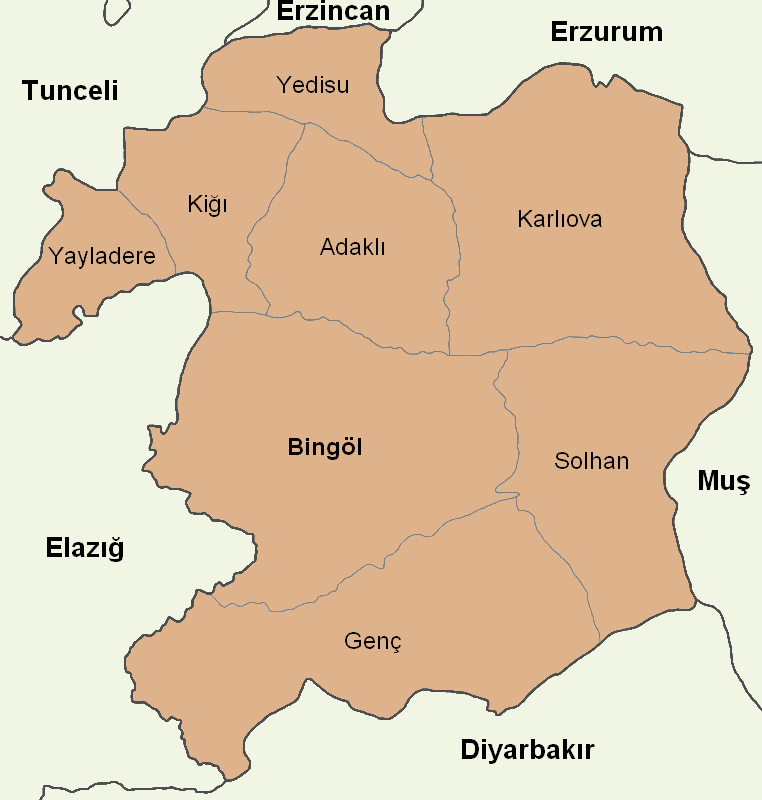
- Map showing Karlıova District in Bingöl Province
- Country: Turkey
- Province: Bingöl
- Seat: Karlıova
- Population (2021): 28,309
- Time zone: UTC+3 (TRT)
- Website: www.karliova.gov.tr

Karlıova District is a district of Bingöl Province in Turkey. The town of Karlıova is the seat and the district had a population of 28,309 in 2021.

The district was established in 1934.

== Geography ==
Karlıova Basin is surrounded by Karagöl, Şeytan and Bingöl Mountains in the north, Şerafettin Mountains in the south and Turna Mountain in the west. The largest lake in Karlıova is Lake Bahri.

== Composition ==
Beside the town of Karlıova, the district encompasses forty-seven villages and twenty-two hamlets.

1. Aşağıyağmurlu (Sêvika cêrin)
2. Bağlıisa (Baxlu)
3. Bahçeköy (Baxçe)
4. Boncukgöze (Boran)
5. Cilligöl (Ciligol)
6. Çatak (Çeteq)
7. Çiftlikköy (Çiftlik)
8. Çukurtepe (Hunyan)
9. Dörtyol (Qirtuzî)
10. Geçitli (Gêlan)
11. Göynük (Gonik)
12. Hacılar (Haciyan)
13. Halifan (Xalifan)
14. Harmantepe (Navro)
15. Hasanova (Heznawê)
16. Ilıpınar (Çêrmûk)
17. Kalencik (Qalencuk)
18. Kantarkaya (Şorika jêrin)
19. Karabalçık (Qere Balcix)
20. Kargapazarı (Qerxe Pazar)
21. Karlıca (Qirmoçek)
22. Kaşıkçı (Qaşuxçî)
23. Kaynak (Ceban)
24. Kaynarpınar (Liçik)
25. Kazanlı (Qezenî)
26. Kıraçtepe (Çewliga Şeman)
27. Kızılağaç (Qizilaxaç)
28. Kızılçubuk (Qizil Çubux)
29. Kümbet (Kumêt)
30. Kürük (Kûrik)
31. Mollaşakir (Botan)
32. Ortaköy (Dewamîyanîn)
33. Sakaören (Siqavêlan)
34. Sarıkuşak (Şarûg)
35. Serpmekaya (Alpiran)
36. Soğukpınar (Gamêşan)
37. Suçatı (Keran)
38. Sudurağı (Azizan)
39. Taşlıçay (Çirik)
40. Toklular (Toxlan)
41. Tuzluca (Şorika corîn)
42. Viranşehir (Wêranşar)
43. Yeniköy (Avahuran)
44. Yiğitler (Saxnîs)
45. Yoncalık (Uncelix)
46. Yorgançayır (Qere Hemze)
47. Yukarıyağmurlu (Sêvika corin)
