= Viranşehir, Karlıova =

Village in Bingöl Province, Turkey

Viranşehir
- Village
- Location within Turkey
- Coordinates: 39.393°N 40.964°E
- Country: Turkey
- Province: Bingöl
- District: Karlıova
- Population (2021): 244
- Time zone: UTC+3 (TRT)

Viranşehir (Kurdish: Wêranşar) is a village in the Karlıova District, Bingöl Province, Turkey. The village is populated by Kurds of the Şadiyan tribe and had a population of 244 in 2021.
