= Yorgançayır, Karlıova =

Village in Bingöl Province, Turkey

Yorgançayır
- Village
- Location within Turkey
- Coordinates: 39.197°N 41.124°E
- Country: Turkey
- Province: Bingöl
- District: Karlıova
- Population (2021): 327
- Time zone: UTC+3 (TRT)

Yorgançayır (Kurdish: Qere Hemze) is a village in the Karlıova District, Bingöl Province, Turkey. The village is populated by Kurds and had a population of 327 in 2021.

The hamlet of Aşağıçır is attached to the village.
