= Yeniköy, Karlıova =

Village in Bingöl Province, Turkey

Yeniköy
- Village
- Location within Turkey
- Coordinates: 39.206°N 40.932°E
- Country: Turkey
- Province: Bingöl
- District: Karlıova
- Population (2021): 125
- Time zone: UTC+3 (TRT)

Yeniköy (Kurdish: Avahuran) is a village in the Karlıova District, Bingöl Province, Turkey. The village had a population of 125 in 2021.
