= Karabalçık, Karlıova =

Village in Bingöl Province, Turkey

Karabalçık
- Village
- Location within Turkey
- Coordinates: 39.181°N 40.897°E
- Country: Turkey
- Province: Bingöl
- District: Karlıova
- Population (2021): 316
- Time zone: UTC+3 (TRT)

Karabalçık (Kurdish: Qere Balcix) is a village in the Karlıova District, Bingöl Province, Turkey. The village is populated by Kurds of the Bekiran tribe and had a population of 316 in 2021.
