= Kaynak, Karlıova =

Village in Bingöl Province, Turkey

Kaynak
- Village
- Location within Turkey
- Coordinates: 39.245°N 40.910°E
- Country: Turkey
- Province: Bingöl
- District: Karlıova
- Population (2021): 142
- Time zone: UTC+3 (TRT)

Kaynak (Kurdish: Ceban) is a village in the Karlıova District, Bingöl Province, Turkey. The village is populated by Kurds of the Hormek tribe and had a population of 142 in 2021.

The hamlet of Kaynak mezrası is attached to the village.
