= Mollaşakir, Karlıova =

Village in Bingöl Province, Turkey

Mollaşakir
- Village
- Location within Turkey
- Coordinates: 39.401°N 41.078°E
- Country: Turkey
- Province: Bingöl
- District: Karlıova
- Population (2021): 458
- Time zone: UTC+3 (TRT)

Mollaşakir (Kurdish: Botan) is a village in the Karlıova District, Bingöl Province, Turkey. The village is populated by Kurds of the Şadiyan tribe and had a population of 458 in 2021.

The hamlet of Tarlacık is attached to the village.
