= Sudurağı, Karlıova =

Village in Bingöl Province, Turkey

Sudurağı
- Village
- Location within Turkey
- Coordinates: 39.127°N 40.853°E
- Country: Turkey
- Province: Bingöl
- District: Karlıova
- Population (2021): 343
- Time zone: UTC+3 (TRT)

Sudurağı (Kurdish: Azîzan) is a village in the Karlıova District, Bingöl Province, Turkey. The village is populated by Kurds and had a population of 343 in 2021.
