= Hacılar, Karlıova =

Village in Bingöl Province, Turkey

Hacılar
- Village
- Location within Turkey
- Coordinates: 39.096°N 40.821°E
- Country: Turkey
- Province: Bingöl
- District: Karlıova
- Population (2021): 1,002
- Time zone: UTC+3 (TRT)

Hacılar (Kurdish: Haciyan) is a village in the Karlıova District, Bingöl Province, Turkey. The village is populated by Kurds of the Bekiran and Şukuran tribes and had a population of 1,002 in 2021.
