= Cilligöl, Karlıova =

Village in Bingöl Province, Turkey

Cilligöl
- Village
- Location within Turkey
- Coordinates: 39.175°N 40.919°E
- Country: Turkey
- Province: Bingöl
- District: Karlıova
- Population (2021): 659
- Time zone: UTC+3 (TRT)

Cilligöl (Kurdish: Ciligol) is a village in the Karlıova District, Bingöl Province, Turkey. The village is populated by Kurds and had a population of 659 in 2021.
