= Halifan, Karlıova =

Village in Bingöl Province, Turkey

Halifan
- Village
- Location within Turkey
- Coordinates: 39.146°N 40.870°E
- Country: Turkey
- Province: Bingöl
- District: Karlıova
- Population (2021): 426
- Time zone: UTC+3 (TRT)

Halifan (formerly Derinçay, Kurdish: Xalifan) is a village in the Karlıova District, Bingöl Province, Turkey. The village is populated by Kurds of the Şukuran tribe and had a population of 426 in 2021.
