= Suçatı, Karlıova =

Village in Bingöl Province, Turkey

Suçatı
- Village
- Location within Turkey
- Coordinates: 39.391°N 40.918°E
- Country: Turkey
- Province: Bingöl
- District: Karlıova
- Population (2021): 346
- Time zone: UTC+3 (TRT)

Suçatı (Kurdish: Keran) is a village in the Karlıova District, Bingöl Province, Turkey. The village is populated by Kurds of the Şadiyan tribe and had a population of 346 in 2021.
