= Kürük, Karlıova =

Village in Bingöl Province, Turkey

Kürük
- Village
- Location within Turkey
- Coordinates: 39.162°N 40.858°E
- Country: Turkey
- Province: Bingöl
- District: Karlıova
- Population (2021): 224
- Time zone: UTC+3 (TRT)

Kürük (formerly Devecik, Kurdish: Kûrik) is a village in the Karlıova District, Bingöl Province, Turkey. The village is populated by Kurds of the Şukuran tribe and had a population of 224 in 2021.

The hamlet of Doğus is attached to the village.
