= Taşlıçay, Karlıova =

Village in Bingöl Province, Turkey

Taşlıçay
- Village
- Location within Turkey
- Coordinates: 39.280°N 40.959°E
- Country: Turkey
- Province: Bingöl
- District: Karlıova
- Population (2021): 1,424
- Time zone: UTC+3 (TRT)

Taşlıçay (Kurdish: Çirik, Armenian: Չիրիկ, romanized: Churuk, Chirik, Cherik, Chesseg) is a village in the Karlıova District, Bingöl Province, Turkey. The village is populated by Kurds of the Cibran tribe and had a population of 1,424 in 2021.

Cheseg had 30 Armenians, 4 houses before the Armenian genocide.
