= Hasanova, Karlıova =

Village in Bingöl Province, Turkey

Hasanova
- Village
- Location within Turkey
- Coordinates: 39.178°N 41.020°E
- Country: Turkey
- Province: Bingöl
- District: Karlıova
- Population (2021): 427
- Time zone: UTC+3 (TRT)

Hasanova (Kurdish: Heznawê) is a village in the Karlıova District, Bingöl Province, Turkey. The village is populated by Kurds of the Abdalan and Cibran tribes and had a population of 427 in 2021.

The hamlets of Burmataş, Konak and Yukarı Çır are attached to the village.
