= Kantarkaya, Karlıova =

Village in Bingöl Province, Turkey

Kargapazarı
- Village
- Location within Turkey
- Coordinates: 39.360°N 41.024°E
- Country: Turkey
- Province: Bingöl
- District: Karlıova
- Population (2021): 453
- Time zone: UTC+3 (TRT)

Kargapazarı (Kurdish: Şorika jêrin) is a village in the Karlıova District, Bingöl Province, Turkey. The village is populated by Kurds of the Cibran tribe and had a population of 453 in 2021.

The hamlet of Kurtyüzü is attached to the village.
