= Çukurtepe, Karlıova =

Village in Bingöl Province, Turkey

Çukurtepe
- Village
- Location within Turkey
- Coordinates: 39.421°N 41.045°E
- Country: Turkey
- Province: Bingöl
- District: Karlıova
- Population (2021): 599
- Time zone: UTC+3 (TRT)

Çukurtepe (Kurdish: Hunyan) is a village in the Karlıova District, Bingöl Province, Turkey. The village is populated by Kurds of the Cibran tribe and had a population of 599 in 2021.
