= Kızılağaç, Karlıova =

Village in Bingöl Province, Turkey

Kızılağaç
- Village
- Location within Turkey
- Coordinates: 39.136°N 40.775°E
- Country: Turkey
- Province: Bingöl
- District: Karlıova
- Population (2021): 192
- Time zone: UTC+3 (TRT)

Kızılağaç (Kurdish: Qizilaxaç) is a village in the Karlıova District, Bingöl Province, Turkey. The village had a population of 192 in 2021.

The hamlet of Meşeli is attached to the village.
