= Sakaören, Karlıova =

Village in Bingöl Province, Turkey

Sakaören
- Village
- Location within Turkey
- Coordinates: 39.285°N 41.085°E
- Country: Turkey
- Province: Bingöl
- District: Karlıova
- Population (2021): 414
- Time zone: UTC+3 (TRT)

Sakaören (Kurdish: Siqavêlan) is a village in the Karlıova District, Bingöl Province, Turkey. The village is populated by Kurds and had a population of 414 in 2021.
