= Kurds =

Iranic ethnic group

کورد, Kurd
- Flag of Kurdistan

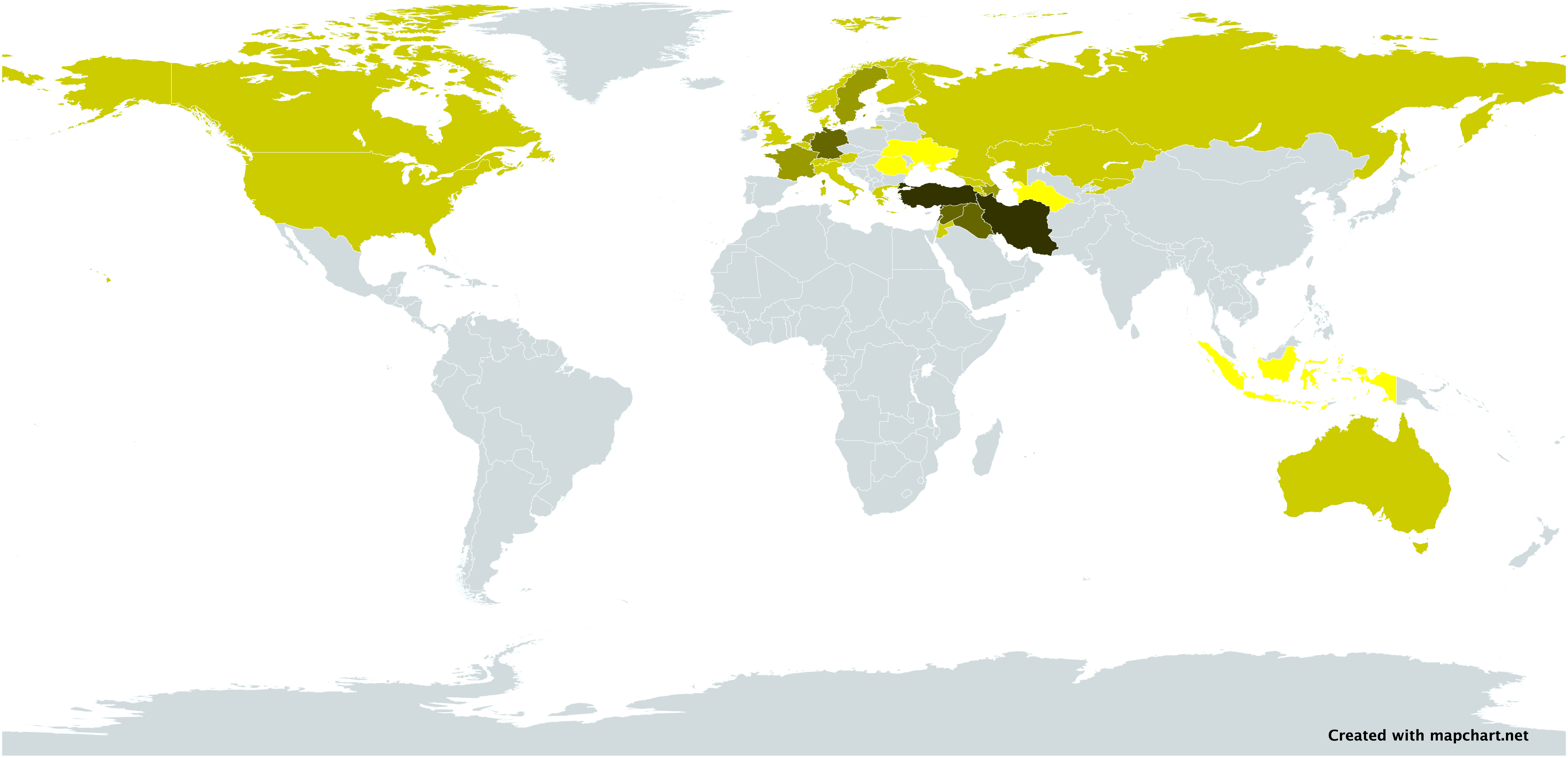

Total population
- 30–35 million (Washington Kurdish Institute, 2024 estimate) 30–40 million (The World Factbook, 2015 estimate) 36.4–45.6 million (Kurdish Institute of Paris, 2017 estimate)

Regions with significant populations
- Turkey: est. 14.3–20 million
- Iran: est. 8.2–12 million
- Iraq: est. 5.6–8.5 million
- Syria: est. 1.5–3.6 million
- Germany: 1.2–1.5 million
- Azerbaijan: 150,000–180,000
- France: 150,000
- Sweden: 100,000+
- Netherlands: 100,000
- Russia: 63,818
- Belgium: 50,000
- United Kingdom: 49,841
- Kazakhstan: 47,938
- Armenia: 37,470
- Switzerland: 35,000
- Denmark: 30,000
- Jordan: 30,000
- Austria: 23,000
- Greece: 22,000
- United States: 20,591–40,000
- Canada: 16,315
- Finland: 15,850
- (Georgia (country)) Georgia: 13,861
- Kyrgyzstan: 13,200
- Australia: 10,171
- Indonesia: 4,800

Languages
- Majority: Kurdish; (Kurmanji; Sorani; Southern Kurdish; Laki); Minority: Zaza; Gorani; Shabaki; Second languages: Turkish; Persian; Arabic; Others

Religion
- Predominantly: Islam (Note: See Kurdish Muslims); (Sunni; Shia); Significant minority: Yazidism; Yarsanism; Zoroastrianism; Alevism; Christianity (Note: See Kurdish Christians); Judaism

Related ethnic groups
- Other Iranic peoples

Kurds (Kurdish: کورد, romanized: Kurd, Kurdish: [kuɾd̪]), or the Kurdish people, are an Iranic ethnic group from West Asia. They are indigenous to Kurdistan, which is a geographic region spanning southeastern Turkey, northwestern Iran, northern Iraq, and northeastern Syria. Consisting of 30–45 million people, the global Kurdish population is largely concentrated in Kurdistan, but significant communities of the Kurdish diaspora exist in parts of West Asia beyond Kurdistan and in parts of Europe, most notably including: Turkey's Central Anatolian Kurds, as well as Istanbul Kurds; Iran's Khorasani Kurds; the Caucasian Kurds, primarily in Azerbaijan and Armenia; and the Kurdish populations in various European countries, namely Germany, France, Sweden, and the Netherlands.

The Kurdish languages and the Zaza–Gorani languages, both of which belong to the Western Iranic branch of the Iranic language family, are the native languages of the Kurdish people. Other widely spoken languages among the community are those of their host countries or neighbouring regions, such as Turkish, Persian, or Arabic. The most prevalent religion among Kurds is Sunni Islam, with Shia Islam and Alevism being significant Islamic minorities. Yazidism, which is the ethnic religion of the Kurdish-speaking Yazidi people, is the largest non-Islamic minority religion among the broader Kurdish community, followed by Yarsanism, Zoroastrianism, and Christianity.

Although they exercise autonomy in Iraq, the Kurds are a stateless nation. The prospect of Kurdish independence, which is rooted in early Kurdish nationalism, has been the source of much ethnic and political tension in West Asia since the 19th century. In the aftermath of World War I and the partition of the Ottoman Empire, the victorious Western Allies made territorial provisions for the establishment of a Kurdish state, as outlined in the 1920 Treaty of Sèvres, but it was never ratified after being signed. Three years later, when the Treaty of Lausanne set the boundaries of the Turkish state, the Western Allies ceased their push for Kurdish statehood in the face of certain agreements and guarantees—chiefly Turkey's relinquishing of territorial claims over formerly Ottoman-ruled Arab lands in exchange for the Allies' recognition of Turkish sovereignty over all of Anatolia. As such, since the 20th century, the history of the Kurds has largely been marked by struggles for independence, predominantly in the Kurdish–Turkish conflict and the Iraqi–Kurdish conflict, and to a lesser extent in the Iranian–Kurdish conflict and the comparatively recent Syrian–Kurdish conflict.

== Etymology ==
The exact origins of the name Kurd are unclear. The underlying toponym is recorded in Assyrian as Qardu and in Middle Bronze Age Sumerian as Kar-da. Assyrian Qardu refers to an area in the upper Tigris basin, and it is presumably reflected in corrupted form in Classical Arabic Ǧūdī (جودي), re-adopted in Kurdish as Cûdî. The name would be continued as the first element in the toponym Corduene, mentioned by Xenophon as the tribe who opposed the retreat of the Ten Thousand through the mountains north of Mesopotamia in the 4th century BC.

There are, however, dissenting views, which do not derive the name of the Kurds from Qardu and Corduene but opt for derivation from Cyrtii (Cyrtaei) instead.

Regardless of its possible roots in ancient toponymy, the ethnonym Kurd might be derived from a term kwrt- used in Middle Persian as a common noun to refer to 'nomads' or 'tent-dwellers', which could be applied as an attribute to any Iranic group with such a lifestyle.

The term gained the characteristic of an ethnonym following the Muslim conquest of Persia, as it was adopted into Arabic and gradually became associated with an amalgamation of Iranic and Iranicized tribes and groups in the region.

However, Boris James argues that the view of Kurd as originally meaning simply 'nomad' is a historiographical misreading, a hyper-reaction against pro-Kurdish essentialism that rested on stretching a narrow remark by Vladimir Minorsky into a general rule. After reviewing early Arabic sources, he concludes that Kurd was already a genuine ethnonym.

In 1923, The Journal of the Royal Asiatic Society of Great Britain and Ireland claimed that the same way Kerman in Persian was Qarman in Syriac, Kurd in Persian was Qardu in Syriac, stating that "the Persian gurd or kurd, which seems to have been derived from a common origin with the Babylonian gardu or qardu, signifies 'brave', 'valiant', or 'warlike', and bravery and the love of fighting are the outstanding traits of the Kurdish character. From the Persians it passed into Arabic, whence it became the common European name of the Kurds."

== Language ==
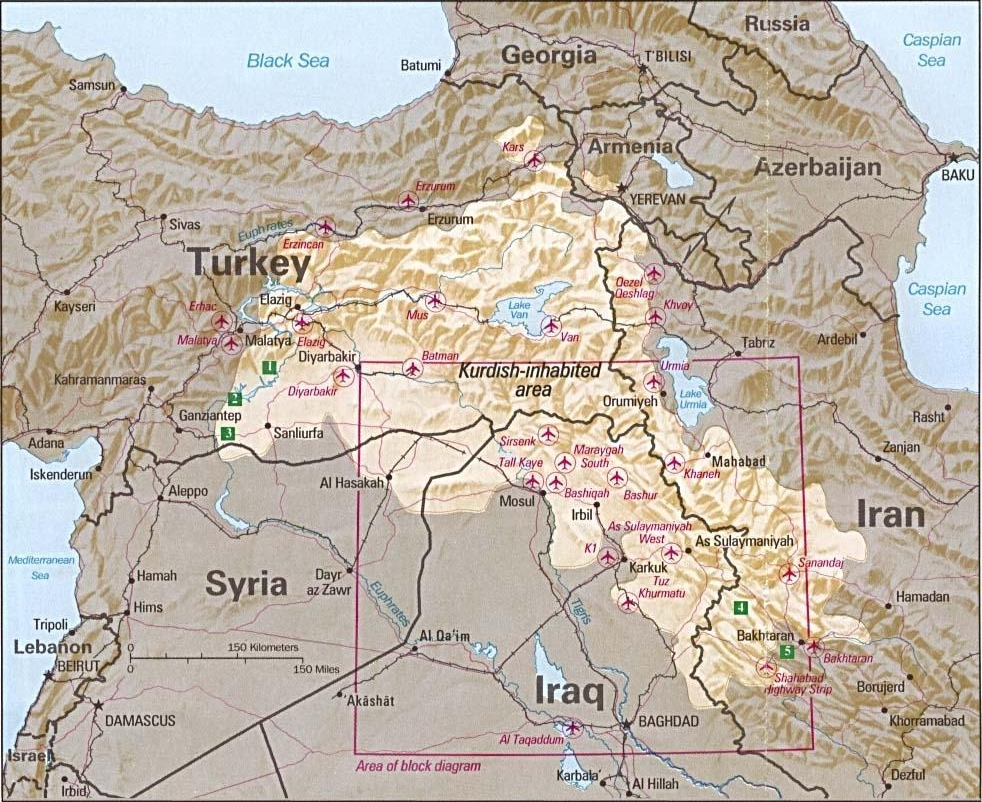
Kurdish-inhabited areas in the Middle East (1992)

Maunsell's map of 1910, a pre-World War I British ethnographical map of the Middle East, showing the Kurdish regions in yellow (both light and dark)

Kurdish (Kurdish: Kurdî or کوردی) is a collection of related dialects spoken by the Kurds. It is mainly spoken in those parts of Iran, Iraq, Syria and Turkey which comprise Kurdistan. Kurdish holds official status in Iraq as a national language alongside Arabic, is recognized in Iran as a regional language, and in Armenia as a minority language. The Kurds are recognized as a people with a distinct language by Arab geographers such as al-Masudi since the 10th century.

Many Kurds are either bilingual or multilingual, speaking the language of their respective nation of origin, such as Arabic, Persian, and Turkish as a second language alongside their native Kurdish, while those in diaspora communities often speak three or more languages. Turkified and Arabised Kurds often speak little or no Kurdish.

According to Mackenzie, there are few linguistic features that all Kurdish dialects have in common and that are not at the same time found in other Iranian languages.

The Kurdish dialects according to Mackenzie are classified as:

- Northern group (the Kurmanji dialect group)
- Central group (part of the Sorani dialect group)
- Southern group (part of the Xwarin dialect group) including Laki

The Zaza and Gorani are ethnic Kurds, but the Zaza–Gorani languages are not classified as Kurdish.

== Population ==
The number of Kurds living in West Asia is estimated at between 30 and 45 million, with another one or two million living in the Kurdish diaspora. Kurds comprise anywhere from 18 to 25% of the population in Turkey, 15 to 20% in Iraq; 10% in Iran; and 9% in Syria. Kurds form regional majorities in all four of these countries, viz. in Turkish Kurdistan, Iraqi Kurdistan, Iranian Kurdistan and Syrian Kurdistan. The Kurds are the fourth largest ethnic group in the Middle East after Arabs, Persians, and Turks.

The total number of Kurds in 1991 was placed at 22.5 million, with 48% of this number living in Turkey, 24% in Iran, 18% in Iraq, and 4% in Syria.

Recent emigration accounts for a population of close to 1.5 million in Western countries, about half of them in Germany.

A special case are the Kurdish populations in the Transcaucasus and Central Asia, displaced there mostly in the time of the Russian Empire, who underwent independent developments for more than a century and have developed an ethnic identity in their own right. This group's population was estimated at close to 0.4 million in 1990.

== Religion ==
=== Islam ===
Most Kurds are Sunni Muslims who adhere to the Shafiʽi school, while a significant minority adhere to the Hanafi school and also Alevism. Moreover, many Shafi'i Kurds adhere to either one of the two Sufi orders Naqshbandi and Qadiriyya.

Beside Sunni Islam, Alevism and Shia Islam also have millions of Kurdish followers.

=== Yazidism ===
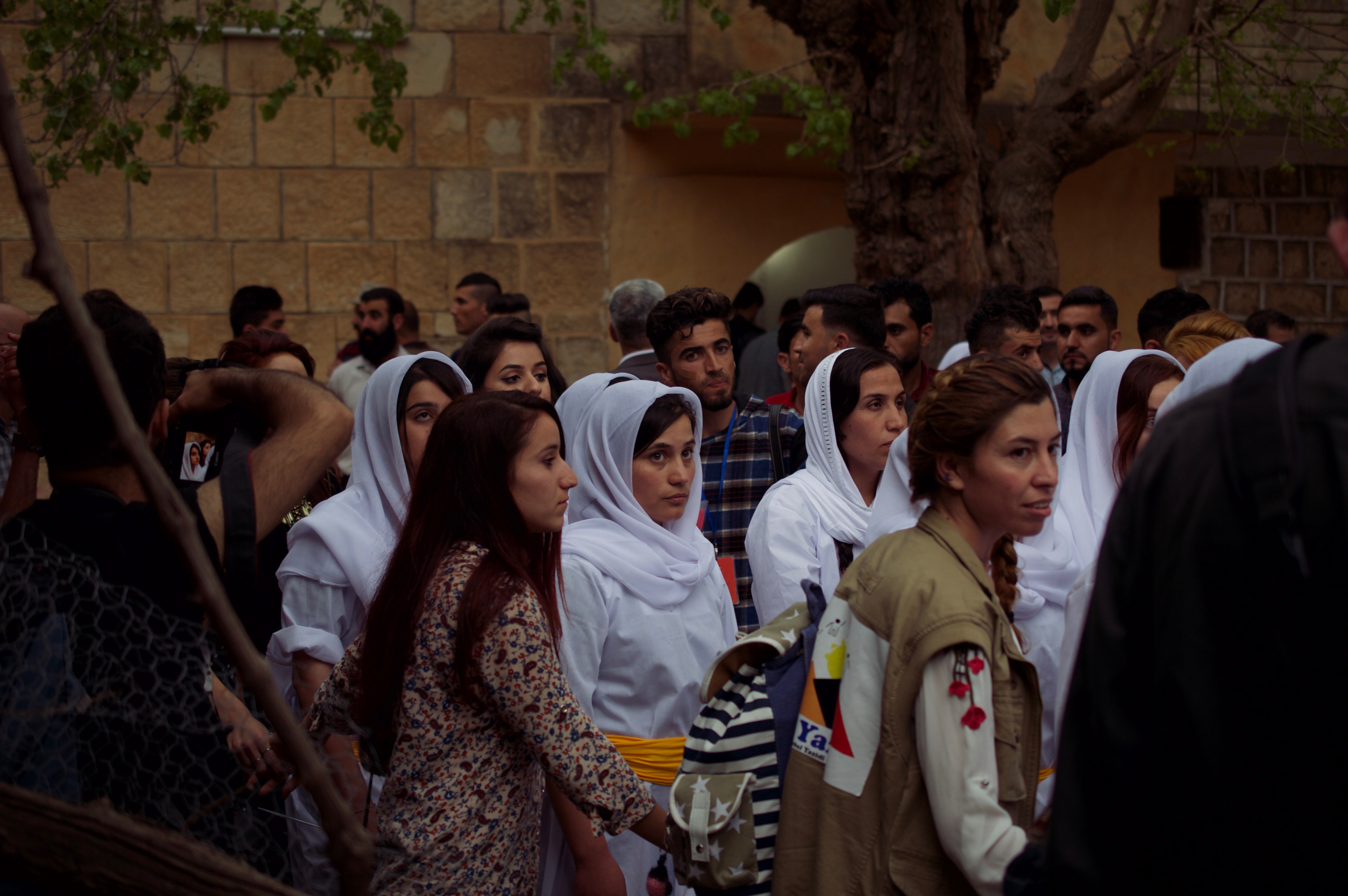
Yazidi new year celebrations in Lalish, 18 April 2017

Yazidism is a monotheistic ethnic religion with roots in a western branch of an Iranic pre-Zoroastrian religion. It is based on the belief of one God who created the world and entrusted it into the care of seven Holy Beings. The leader of this heptad is Tawûsê Melek, who is symbolized with a peacock. Its adherents number from 700,000 to 1 million worldwide and are indigenous to the Kurdish regions of Iraq, Syria and Turkey, with some significant, more recent communities in Russia, Georgia and Armenia established by refugees fleeing persecution by Muslims in Ottoman Empire. Yazidism shares with Kurdish Alevism and Yarsanism many similar qualities that date back to the pre-Islamic era.

=== Yarsanism ===
Yarsanism (also known as Ahl-I-Haqq, Ahl-e-Hagh or Kakai) is also one of the religions associated with Kurdistan.

Although most of the sacred Yarsan texts are in the Gorani and all of the Yarsan holy places are located in Kurdistan, followers of this religion are also found in other regions. For example, while there are more than 300,000 Yarsani in Iraqi Kurdistan, there are more than 2 million Yarsani in Iran. However, the Yarsani lack political rights in both countries.

=== Zoroastrianism ===
Faravahar (or Ferohar), one of the primary symbols of Zoroastrianism, believed to be the depiction of a Fravashi (guardian spirit)

The Iranian religion of Zoroastrianism has had a major influence on the Iranian culture, which Kurds are a part of, and has maintained some effect since the demise of the religion in the Middle Ages. The Iranian philosopher Sohrevardi drew heavily from Zoroastrian teachings. Ascribed to the teachings of the prophet Zoroaster, the faith's Supreme Being is Ahura Mazda. Leading characteristics, such as messianism, the Golden Rule, heaven and hell, and free will influenced other religious systems, including Second Temple Judaism, Gnosticism, Christianity, and Islam.

In 2016, the first official Zoroastrian fire temple of Iraqi Kurdistan opened in Sulaymaniyah. Attendees celebrated the occasion by lighting a ritual fire and beating the frame drum or 'daf'. Awat Tayib, the chief of followers of Zoroastrianism in the Kurdistan region, claimed that many were returning to Zoroastrianism but some kept it secret out of fear of reprisals from Islamists.

=== Christianity ===
Although historically there have been various accounts of Kurdish Christians, most often these were in the form of individuals, and not as communities. However, in the 19th and 20th century various travel logs tell of Kurdish Christian tribes, as well as Kurdish Muslim tribes who had substantial Christian populations living amongst them. A significant number of these were allegedly originally Armenian or Assyrian, and it has been recorded that a small number of Christian traditions have been preserved. Several Christian prayers in Kurdish have been found from earlier centuries. In recent years some Kurds from Muslim backgrounds have converted to Christianity.

Segments of the Bible were first made available in the Kurdish language in 1856 in the Kurmanji dialect. The Gospels were translated by Stepan, an Armenian employee of the American Bible Society and were published in 1857. Prominent historical Kurdish Christians include the brothers Zakare and Ivane Mkhargrdzeli.

== History ==
=== Antiquity ===
The country Kar-da-ka is mentioned on a Sumerian clay tablet dated to the end of the 3rd millennium BC. This land was located next to "the people of Su", which G. R. Driver placed to the south of Lake Van. A thousand years later, a people called the Qur‑ṭi‑e, thought by Driver to be related to Kar-da-ka—written Kar-da by him—and located west of Lake Van, are mentioned in the inscriptions of the Assyrian king Tiglath-Pileser I. In the late 5th century BC, Xenophon mentioned the Karduchoi, a people living to the east of the Bohtan River; this name survived in later times as Qardu or Corduene and other similar toponyms near Mount Judi, on the left bank of the Tigris. The connection between Kurd and Qardu and the identification of the Kurds with the Karduchoi, based on the similarity of the names and the correspondence of the inhabited territory, was widely accepted at the beginning of the 20th century, but it was deemed philologically impossible by Martin Hartmann, Theodor Nöldeke and F. H. Weissbach, who instead identified the Cyrtians, a tribe living in Media and Persia, as the ancestors of the Kurds. (Note: This identification was earlier proposed by F. C. Andreas. Garnik Asatrian considers the identification of the ethnonyms to be likely but not the actual descent of the Kurds from the Cyrtians.) Since then, the connection between Kurd and Qardu / Karduchoi has been rejected by many scholars.

Many Kurds consider themselves descended from the Medes, an ancient Iranian people, and even use a calendar dating from 612 BC, when the Assyrian capital of Nineveh was conquered by the Medes. The claimed Median descent is reflected in the words of the Kurdish national anthem: "We are the children of the Medes and Cyaxares." Both Kurdish and the Median language (about which very little is known) are categorized as Northwestern Iranian languages, but the current scholarly consensus is that there is no attested pre-modern ancestor of the Kurdish languages. The existing evidence suggests that Kurdish is not a descendant of the Median language. D. N. Mackenzie theorized that Kurdish split off from the linguistic sub-group of Median at an early point and evolved in parallel with Persian. Certain essential similarities exist between Kurdish and Persian, more than other Northwestern Iranian languages, which has led some scholars to conclude that Kurdish developed from early on in close proximity to Persian, with Kurdish speakers later migrating into the Median territory.

The term Kurd is first encountered in Arabic sources of the seventh century. Books from the early Islamic era, including those containing legends such as the Shahnameh and the Middle Persian Kar-Namag i Ardashir i Pabagan, and other early Islamic sources provide early attestation of the name Kurd. The Kurds have ethnically diverse origins.

During the Sasanian era, in Kar-Namag i Ardashir i Pabagan, a short prose work written in Middle Persian, Ardashir I is depicted as having battled the Kurds and their leader, Madig. After initially sustaining a heavy defeat, Ardashir I was successful in subjugating the Kurds. In a letter Ardashir I received from his foe, Ardavan V, which is also featured in the same work, he is referred to as being a Kurd himself.

You've bitten off more than you can chew
and you have brought death to yourself.
O son of a Kurd, raised in the tents of the Kurds,
who gave you permission to put a crown on your head?

The usage of the term Kurd during this time period most likely was a social term, designating Northwestern Iranian nomads, rather than a concrete ethnic group.

Similarly, in AD 360, the Sasanian king Shapur II marched into the Roman province Zabdicene, to conquer its chief city, Bezabde, present-day Cizre. He found it heavily fortified and guarded by three legions and a large body of Kurdish archers. After a long and hard-fought siege, Shapur II breached the walls, conquered the city and massacred all its defenders. Thereafter he had the strategically located city repaired, provisioned and garrisoned with his best troops.

Qadishaye, settled by Kavad in Singara, were probably Kurds and worshiped the martyr Abd al-Masih. They revolted against the Sasanians and were raiding the whole Persian territory. Later they, along with Arabs and Armenians, joined the Sasanians in their war against the Byzantines.

There is also a 7th-century text by an unidentified author, written about the legendary Christian martyr Mar Qardagh. He lived in the 4th century, during the reign of Shapur II, and during his travels is said to have encountered Mar Abdisho, a deacon and martyr, who, after having been questioned of his origins by Mar Qardagh and his Marzobans, stated that his parents were originally from an Assyrian village called Hazza, but were driven out and subsequently settled in Tamanon, a village in "the land of the Kurds", identified as being in the region of Mount Judi.

=== Islamic conquest ===
Although the Kurds sporadically appeared in Arabic sources after the Islamic conquest of Iran in the early Middle Ages, the term "Kurd" was not used for a specific people, and instead referred to an amalgam of nomadic western Iranian tribes distinct from Persians. By the High Middle Ages, the Kurdish ethnic identity gradually materialized, with clear evidence of Kurdish ethnic identity and solidarity in texts of the 12th and 13th centuries. However, the term also remained in use in the social sense. Several Arabic texts after the 10th century, including al-Masudi's works, referred to the Kurds as a distinct linguistic group. The term "Kurd" after the 11th century was explicitly defined as an ethnonym and did not suggest synonymity with the ethnographic category nomad used earlier.

After the Islamic conquest of Iran, the Arab Muslim geographers and historians generally included the Kurds within the regions of Zawzan, Khilat, Arminiya, Adharbayjan, Jibal, and Fars, before the term Kurdistan came into use during the Seljuk era. Before the term Kurdistan was introduced around the 12th century, historical sources often mentioned the Kurdish regions as "Bilad al-Akrad". In the early centuries of Islam, Arab and Persian historians, among them Masudi and Istakhri, frequently mentioned Kurds living outside of Kurdistan, in areas such as Khorasan, Sistan, Kerman, and especially in Fars. At that time, the term "Kurd" did not have ethnic connotations and generally referred to nomadic people, and later scholars claimed that the Kurds of Fars mentioned in the Islamic texts were likely not Kurds but nomads speaking dialects related to Persian and Luri. Before the 20th century, no basic distinction was recognized between Kurdish and Luri, and they were only later found to follow the Northwestern-Southwestern division of Iranian languages.

The Arab Muslims first encountered the Kurds after the occupation of Tikrit and Hulwan in 637. Sa'd ibn Abi Waqqas marched on Mosul where there were districts with a Kurdish population such as al-Marj, Ba-Nuhadra, Ba-Adra, Hibtun, and Dasin. The conquest of the region was completed by Iyad ibn Ghanm and Utba. In 640, the authority of the patriarch of Zawzan was confirmed after he paid the kharaj. Sources mentioned the Kurds having fought against the Arabs in 639, when they sided with al-Hurmuzan, the Persian governor of Ahwaz, and in 642, when they supported the Persians in the defense of Fasa and Darabjird.

The caliph Umar sent several expeditions against the Kurds of Ahwaz, while at the same time the Kurds had invaded the region of the central Karkheh (Saymara, Masabadhan). Although the Arabs had reached Shahrizur before Islam, the final occupation of Shahrizur, Darabadh, and Samghan in 643 was only achieved after bloody fighting. Abu Musa al-Ashari, the governor of Basra, suppressed Kurdish uprisings in Berudh and Balasjan in 645, although the Kurds, having been forced into Islam, apostatized in large numbers. Under the caliph Ali, the Kurds joined the Persians and Christians in the revolt of al-Khirrit near Ahwaz and in Fars, although he was defeated at Ramhormoz. Sulayman ibn Burayda al-Aslami, the qadi of Merv, reported that the caliph Umar instructed Salama ibn Qays to lead the campaign against the Kurds, but to first offer them three choices. If they accepted Islam but wanted to stay in their homeland, they should pay zakat and receive none of the fay' of the Muslims. If they joined the conquerors, they received their same benefits and were subject to the same duties. If they refused Islam, they should pay kharaj, and if they refused that as well they should be fought. He also reported that Umar later enquired about the campaign against the Kurds, calling them migrants.

The Kurds were an important element in the Sasanian Empire and strongly supported the Sasanians as they resisted the Muslim armies between 639 and 644. However, when it became clear that the Sassanids would soon fall, the Kurdish leaders gradually submitted to the Muslim armies and accepted Islam. By the 8th century, most of the Kurds were converted to Islam. Despite most Kurds having converted to Islam, there were smaller communities of Kurds throughout the impenetrable mountains which had not converted to Islam. Some of them survived as late as the 13th century, and sometimes even attacked the Muslim settlements. Bar Hebraeus wrote that it "in the year six hundred and two of the Arabs [1205 AD], a race of the Kurds who were in the mountains of Madai (Media), and who are called Tirahaye, came down from the mountains, and wrought great destruction in those countries. And troops of the Persians were gathered together, and they met them in battle and many of them were killed. Now these mountaineers had not entered the Faith of the Muslims, but they had adopted the primitive paganism and Magianism. When a Muslim fell into their hands they put him to death with cruel tortures." The Mazdakites and Khurramites also had many followers among the Kurds. Dabestan-e Mazaheb mentioned two Mazdakite leaders in later periods who were Kurds.

Al-Mukhtar, who seized Arminiya and Adharbayjan during the reign of Umayyad caliph Abd al-Malek, appointed a governor at Hulwan in 685 with the main task of fighting the Kurds, although his death disrupted the plan. In 702, Abd al-Rahman ibn al-Ash'ath made an alliance with the Kurds of Sabur in Fars, and in 708, the Kurds ravaged Fars and were punished by al-Hajjaj. In 746, the Kurds of Sabur resisted Sulayman the Khariji. Under the caliph al-Mansur, the Kurds were mentioned in connection with the rising at Mosul and its repercussions in Hamadan. Under the caliph al-Mu'tasim, in 839, Jafar ibn Faharjis, from a noble Kurdish family, revolted in Mosul and was defeated at Babaghesh, after which he took refuge in the mountains of Dasin and defeated the troops of the caliph but was finally defeated by a Turkish commander Aytakh. In 845, the Kurds revolted in Jibal, Isfahan, and Fars, but was quickly suppressed by a Turkish general Wasif. In 866, the Kurds of Mosul joined Musawir the Khariji. In 875, the Kurds played a considerable part in the Zanj Rebellion led by al-Khabith, and the uprising of Ya'qub al-Saffar.

Ya'qub al-Saffar appointed a Kurdish lieutenant Muhammad Ubayd Allah Hazarmand in Ahwaz, although he ambitiously engaged in secret negotiations with al-Khabith, who sent reinforcements to Muhammad as he marched on Sus, but was defeated by Ahmad ibn Laythuya, another Kurd who was the commander of Kurdish levies sent by the caliph to suppress Ya'qub al-Saffar. When Ahmad left, Muhammad secured more reinforcements from al-Khabith and seized Shushtar, where he was supposed to read the khutba in the name of al-Khabith but read it in the name of al-Mu'tamid and Yaqub al-Saffar, after which his Zanj allies deserted him, and Ahmad ibn Laythuya reoccupied Shushtar and Muhammad retired to Ramhormoz but was expelled. Muhammad sought help of al-Khabith again due to differences with the Darnan Kurds, and al-Khabith sent him troops as he agreed to proclaim him as caliph. The situation stabilized after the death of Yaqub al-Saffar in 879 and al-Khabith in 883.

In 894, the Kurds were among the supporters of Hamdan ibn Hamdun at Mosul. There was also a failed Kurdish rebellion in 897 led by Abu Layla. In 896, the Hadhabani Kurds and their leader Muhammad bin Bilal laid waste to Nineveh, and the new governor Abd Allah bin Hamdan pursued them but was defeated in Ma'tuba. Next year, he sent reinforcements from the caliph to pursue 5,000 Hadhabani families who had retreated to Adharbayjan and fortified themselves. The Hadhabani eventually surrendered, followed by the Humaydi tribe, and the Kurds of Dasin mountain. Under the caliph al-Muqtadir, the Kurds plundered the environs of Mosul but were punished by the Hamdanid governors, and the Jalali tribe particularly put up stubborn resistance. In 943, Ibn Miskawayh mentioned that Jafar ibn Shakkuya, the Hadhabani leader in Salmas, supported the Hamdanid Husayn in his expedition in Adharbayjan.

Numerous Kurdish dynasties emerged alongside Daylamite and Khorasani dynasties during the Iranian Intermezzo. Scholars added that there was a Kurdish interlude throughout the Near East from 950 to 1050 with the rise of several distinct but similar mountainous dynasties. At the same time, as more Turkic migrations entered the region, despite sometimes intermingling, the Kurds increasingly asserted their distinct identity as a cohesive group, evident during political disputes between Kurdish and Turkoman rulers or dynasties.

Daysam ibn Ibrahim eventually rose to prominence and was closely associated with the Kurds. His followers were Kurds with the exception of a few Daylamites. He was a Khariji who seized Adharbayjan after Yusuf ibn Abi al-Saj, and in 938 he used his Kurds to defeat Lashkari bin Mardi, a lieutenant of the Ziyarid ruler Vushmgir. The Musafirid ruler Marzuban later took Adharbayjan, and Daysam fled to his friend Hajik bin al-Dayrani, an Armenian king. He later returned to Adharbayjan when Marzuban was imprisoned by the Buyids, but was later again driven out by Marzuban and again sought refuge with Hajik bin al-Dayrani, who handed him to Marzuban against his will. He was blinded and died in prison in 956-7. While Marzuban was imprisoned, several rulers set themselves up in Adharbayjan, among them was Muhammad Shaddad bin Qartu of the Rawwadi tribe in 951 who founded the Shaddadid dynasty, which were allied to the Byzantines and Seljuks, and were also the ancestors of the Ayyubid dynasty. In 960, a pretender appeared in Adharbayjan named Ishaq ibn Isa, supported by Qahtani Kurdish leader Fadl, while the Hadhabani Kurds supported his adversary, Jastan ibn Marzuban. Ishaq was soon killed. The Kurds and Daylamites played a considerable role in the conflict between Jastan and his brother Nasir al-Dawla, and between Ibrahim ibn Marzuban and his cousin Ismail ibn Vahsudan.

Around 959, the second Kurdish dynasty rose in Jibal, known as the Hasanwayhids, founded by Hasanwayh ibn Hasan, the leader of the Kurdish Barzikani (or Barzini) tribe. He had earlier assisted Rukn al-Dawla in his expedition in Khorasan. He died around 979, and his possessions were overrun by Adud al-Dawla, although Adud al-Dawla later granted investiture to Badr ibn Hasanwayh. The successor of Badr was Tahir (or Zahir) who reigned for one year before being driven out by Shams al-Dawla. Adud al-Dawla was more severe with the Kurds than Rukn al-Dawla. In 978, the Kurdish leader Ibn Baduya became independent with the support of the Hamdanid Abu Taghlib, but later sided with Adud al-Dawla. In 979, Adud al-Dawla sent an expedition against the Kurds of Shahrizur, who had established business and marital ties with the Banu Shayban Bedouins, occupying Shahrizur while the Bedouins returned to the desert. Another expedition was sent against the Hakkari Kurds in 980, and they were crucified along the road from Ma'althaya to Mosul. Even during the lifetime of Adud al-Dawla, the Humaydi leader, Abu Abd Allah Husayn ibn Dushanj (or Abu Shuja Ba'dh ibn Dustak), had attained notoriety.

Ba'dh was initially a shepherd but gradually rose to be lord of Arjish, Amid, and Mayyafarqin, and an uprising in Nisibin brought him in conflict with Samsam al-Dawla, who he defeated, afterwards seizing Mosul and attempting a march on Baghdad to end Buyid rule but was defeated by Samsam al-Dawla. In 990, Ba'dh collected many Bashnawi Kurds and encamped the walls of Mosul, negotiating with its inhabitants, although the Hamdanid princes with the help of Banu Uqayl attacked and defeated them, and Ba'dh was crucified but given a proper Islamic burial. Around 990-1000, Samsam al-Dawla attempted to improve his position and allied with Fulad ibn Mundhir, who was supported by the Kurdish cavalry mobilized at Shiraz, and after his failure, he sought refuge with the Kurds, but they betrayed him and he took refuge with Fakhr al-Dawla, who was known to hate Kurds.

The Hazaraspid dynasty of Lur-e-Bozorg was descended from a Kurdish leader in Syria named Fadlawi. His descendants left Syria, passing through Mayyafaraqin and Adharbayjan, where they made an alliance with the ruler of Gilan, and finally arrived in Luristan in 1106. The dynasty was established in 1155 and ruled until 1423, and it was established by Abu Tahir, who was the 9th successor of Fadlawi according to the Jahan-ara. The Fadlawi Kurds were between 100 and 400, and initially settled on the Khorshidi lands of Lur-e-Kuchak before moving southwards. Around 1204, numerous Iranian tribes flocked to the Hazaraspid domain, among them were two Arab tribes. All the tribes came from Syria and had a considerable effect on the ethnic composition of Lur-e-Bozorg. The Iranian migrants were probably Kurds whom traces of them survived among the Kurds mentioned by Ibn Battuta near Behbahan and Ramhormoz. There was historically a village named Kurdistan on the Jarrahi river and even gave its name to the river. Shahab al-Din al-Umari mentioned the existence of Lurs in Egypt and Syria which were massacred by Salah al-Din. These anecdotes highlighted the causes for the numerous Iranian tribes arriving in or returning to Luristan.

The Kurdish Marwanid dynasty was closely connected to Ba'dh and the Humaydi tribe. Abu Ali bin Marwan bin Dustak, nephew of Ba'dh, after the defeat at Mosul, withdrew to Hisn Kayfa where a Daylamite wife of Ba'dh lived, and he married her and inherited a former stronghold of Ba'dh and established himself in Diyarbakr. The Marwanids ruled from 990 to 1096. They ruled over Diyarbakr (Amid, Arzan, Mayyafaraqin, Hisn Kayfa), as well as Khilat, Malazgird, Arjish, and the northeast of Lake Van, and they briefly held Urfa at one point.

In 991, the Marwanid Abu Ali Hasan invaded Syria and took it from Basil II, although he was killed in 997 in a revolt by the people of Diyarbakr. His brother, Abu Mansur Mumahhid al-Dawla had seized Mayyafaraqin after the death of Ba'dh and ruled there until 1011. He was succeeded by his brother Abu Nasr Ahmad who reigned from 1011-12 to 1061, and he seized Urfa in 1025 but the Byzantines recaptured it in 1031. In 1050, he paid homage to Tughril Bek. His son and successor Abu al-Qasim Nasr, also known as Nizam al-Dawla, shared power with his brother Sa'id, and captured the lands of Harran and Suwayda. He was succeeded by Mansur ibn Sa'id who ruled nominally from 1079 to 1096, although by 1085, almost all of his lands were taken by Seljuk general Fakhr al-Dawla bin Jahir and placed under the authority of the Atabeks of Mosul.

=== Turkic invasion ===
Before the Turkic invasions of Anatolia and Armenia, there were frequent mentions of Kurds in regional conflicts. During the reign of al-Qadir, historians recorded that a Kurd named Ahmad ibn al-Dahhak had killed the general of Basil II. Between 976 and 998, Kurds took part in the struggle between the Buyids and Ziyarids. Mahmud of Ghazni used Kurds during his conflict with the Karakhanids. The Kurds also took part in the Buyid civil wars, and the struggle of Banu Uqayl for Mosul. In 1020, the Kurds fought against Turkish soldiers who mutinied in Hamadan. In 1024-29, the Kurds were reported to have fought against the last Buyid ruler, Abu Kalijar, in Fars and Khuzestan. The Kurds were largely exhausted from continual fighting at the time the Turks entered Anatolia.

In 1029, when the Oghuz predecessors of the Seljuks reached Rey (Tehran), Tash Farrash, a Turkish general in the Ghaznavids, went to meet them with 3,000 horsemen including Kurds. The leader of the Kurds was captured and sent a message to his men to cease fighting, causing a tumult in which Tash Farash was killed. In the same year, the Turks reached Maragheh and executed many Hadhabani Kurds, although they retreated after the Kurds made an alliance with the rulers of Azarbayjan. Another group of Oghuz had attacked Armenia and returned to Urmia and the lands of Abu al-Hayha Hadhabani where the Kurds attacked them but were defeated. In 1041, while Wahsudan II ibn Mamlan of the Musafirids massacred many Oghuz in Tabriz, the Oghuz of Urmia went to Hakkari and ravaged the region, but during the process the Kurds attacked the Oghuz, killing 1,500 men and taking prisoners and loot. As the troops of Tughril Bey were approaching, the Oghuz took fright and pushed onwards, where Kurdish guides led them through Zawzan to the Jazira. One section of the Oghuz under Mansur bin Ghuzoghli remained to the east of the Jazira, while the other under Buqa marched on Diyarbakir. Sulayman bin Naser al-Dawla, the Marwanid ruler, persuaded the Oghuz to wait until spring before traversing his lands to join the other Oghuz who settled in Syria. He then unexpectedly seized Mansur, and pursued the Oghuz with the help of the Bashnawi Kurds of Finik, although they still ravaged Diyarbakir and seized Mosul. Around the same time, the Hasanwayhids were succeeded by the Annazids.

After the defeat of Romanus IV at the Malazgirt, all of Armenia fell to the Seljuks. At the same time, the small Kurdish dynasties had disappeared. In 1100, the last Marwanid disappeared in the region of Khilat where the Turk Suqman Qutbi founded the dynasty of the Shah-Armens which lasted around a century before the rise of the Ayyubids. In 1101, Annazid Kurdish leader Sorkhab ibn Badr lost 2,000 men while fighting with Salghur Karabuli, and later lost most of his lands to other Turkoman leaders. Despite this, the Kurds were often mentioned throughout the 11th and 12th centuries. Malik-Shah I employed Kurds and Arabs in his struggle against Qavurt of Kerman, while there were Kurdish raids in Dujayl and Mardin in 1103, 1105, and 1109-10. Ahmadil ibn Wahdusan, the Rawwadi Kurdish lord of Maragheh, took part in the campaign of Muhammad ibn Malik Shah in Syria in 1110, along with Suqman, the Turkic shah of Armenia, although the campaign failed and ended in the Kurds besieging Suqman.

Under Sultan Sanjar, the province of Kurdistan was formed, which was a thriving province centered around Bahar, Hamadan. The Kurds took part in the troubles of 1119, and in 1122, a punitive expedition passed through the districts of Hakkari, Zawzan, and Bashnawi, although the Kurds seized the Christian patriarch stronghold of Tur Abdin shortly afterwards. Meanwhile, the Atabeks of Mosul under Imad al-Din Zengi had also seized Kurdish territories. After the death of Salahuddin, the Zengids consolidated their position in central Kurdistan and captured more territory. The Kurds were involved in several conflicts against the Artuqids, the Atabeks of Diyarbakir. The Abbasid caliphs, free from the tutelage of their protectors, had negotiated with the Kurds, seeking to weaken the Turks. In 1185, under the caliph al-Nasir, a minor incident resulted in a war between Kurds and Turkomans, although they stopped fighting after two years to fight against the Christians of Armenia, Assyria, Syria, Mesopotamia, and Cappadocia. However, more feuds broke out between them, and the Kurds fought their way back to Cilicia after many fierce battles. The Kurds of Cilicia and Syria were largely killed, and entrusted their goods to their Christian neighbors as they fled, while the Christians concealed some Kurds. The Turks later attacked the Christians.

The Kurds largely adjusted to the Arab invasion and were never swamped by Arab tribes despite occasional intermingling. However, they had a much harder time adjusting to the Turkomans as consecutive waves of Turkic migrations later entered the region. Despite Seljuk efforts to keep the disruptive Turkomans on the move into Anatolia, the Kurds were displaced in northern Mesopotamia and Azerbaijan, and the efforts by local Kurdish rulers to incorporate the Turkic tribesmen into their forces usually failed and they did not integrate. Although chiefly families sometimes intermarried, the tribes were largely anarchic and unreliable, and in some cases it took over a century for Turkoman and Kurdish tribes to merely establish a modus vivendi. Due to the Turkic invasion of Anatolia and Armenia, the 11th-century Kurdish dynasties crumbled and became incorporated into the Seljuk dynasty. Kurds would hereafter be used in great numbers in the armies of the Zengids.

=== Ayyubid period ===
The Ayyubid dynasty was founded by Kurdish ruler Saladin, as succeeding the Zengids, the Ayyubids established themselves in 1171. Saladin led the Muslims to recapture the city of Jerusalem from the Crusaders at the Battle of Hattin, also frequently clashing with the Assassins. The Ayyubid dynasty lasted until 1341 when the Ayyubid sultanate fell to Mongolian invasions.

Shihab al-Din al-Umari claimed that after the Mongol invasion, Shahrizor was depopulated and its Kurdish inhabitants fled to Syria and Egypt. Later, Ibn Khaldun reported that the Kurdish tribes of Lawen and Babin were present in Algeria.

=== Safavid period ===
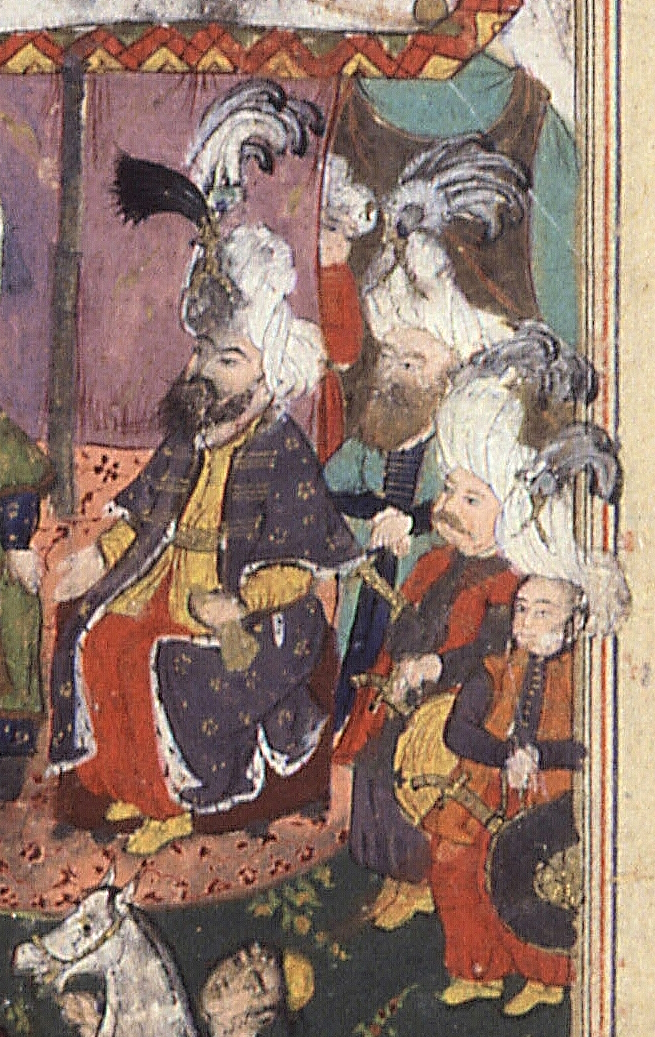
Eyewitness depiction of Kurdish prince Mir Sheref and his retinue in Jizra in 1602–03 (BNF, Turc 127).

The Kurds were systematically persecuted in the Aq Qoyunlu. The Safavid Empire, established in 1501, also established its rule over Kurdish-inhabited territories. The paternal line of this family actually had Kurdish roots, tracing back to Firuz-Shah Zarrin-Kolah, a dignitary who moved from Kurdistan to Ardabil in the 11th century. The Battle of Chaldiran in 1514 that culminated in what is nowadays Iran's West Azerbaijan Province, marked the start of the Ottoman–Persian Wars between the Iranian Safavids (and successive Iranian dynasties) and the Ottomans. For the next 300 years, many of the Kurds found themselves living in territories that frequently changed hands between Ottoman Turkey and Iran during the protracted series of Ottoman–Persian Wars.

The Safavid Shah Ismail I (r. 1501–1524) put down a Yezidi rebellion which went on from 1506 to 1510. A century later, the year-long Battle of Dimdim took place, wherein the Safavid Shah Abbas I (r. 1588–1629) succeeded in putting down the rebellion led by the Kurdish ruler Amir Khan Lepzerin. Thereafter, many Kurds were deported to Khorasan, not only to weaken the Kurds, but also to protect the eastern border from invading Afghan and Turkmen tribes. Other forced movements and deportations of other groups were also implemented by Abbas I and his successors, most notably of the Armenians, the Georgians, and the Circassians, who were moved en masse to and from other districts within the Persian empire.

The Kurds of Khorasan, numbering around 700,000, still use the Kurmanji Kurdish dialect. Several Kurdish noblemen served the Safavids and rose to prominence, such as Shaykh Ali Khan Zanganeh, who served as the grand vizier of Shah Suleiman I (r. 1666–1694) from 1669 to 1689. Due to his efforts in reforming the declining Iranian economy, he has been called the "Safavid Amir Kabir" in modern historiography. His son, Shahqoli Khan Zanganeh, also served as a grand vizier from 1707 to 1716. Another Kurdish statesman, Ganj Ali Khan, was close friends with Abbas I, and served as governor in various provinces and was known for his loyal service.

=== Zand period ===
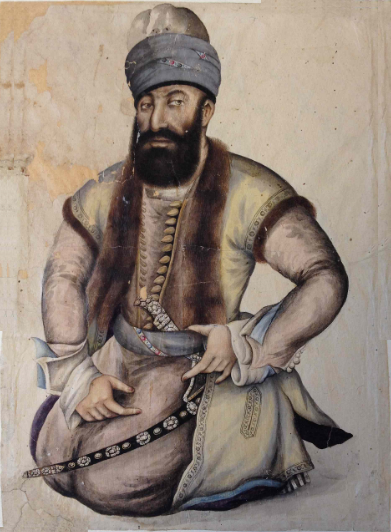
Karim Khan, the Laki ruler of the Zand Dynasty

After the fall of the Safavids, Iran fell under the control of the Afsharid Empire ruled by Nader Shah at its peak. After Nader's death, Iran fell into civil war, with multiple leaders trying to gain control over the country. Ultimately, it was Karim Khan Zand, a Laki general of the Zand tribe, who would come to power.

The country would flourish during Karim Khan's reign; a strong resurgence of the arts would take place, and international ties were strengthened. Karim Khan was portrayed as being a ruler who truly cared about his subjects, thereby gaining the title Vakil ol-Ra'aya (meaning "Representative of the People" in Persian). Though not as powerful in its geopolitical and military reach as the preceding Safavids and Afsharids or even the early Qajars, he managed to reassert Iranian hegemony over its integral territories in the Caucasus, and presided over an era of relative peace, prosperity, and tranquility. In Ottoman Iraq, following the Ottoman–Persian War (1775–1776), Karim Khan managed to seize Basra for several years.

After Karim Khan's death, the dynasty would decline in favour of the rival Qajars due to infighting between the Khan's incompetent offspring. It was not until Lotf Ali Khan, 10 years later, that the dynasty would once again be led by an adept ruler. By this time however, the Qajars had already progressed greatly, having taken a number of Zand territories. Lotf Ali Khan had multiple successes before ultimately succumbing to the rival faction. Iran and all its Kurdish territories would hereby be incorporated in the Qajar dynasty.

The Kurdish tribes present in Baluchistan and some of those in Fars are believed to be remnants of those that assisted and accompanied Lotf Ali Khan and Karim Khan, respectively.

=== Ottoman period ===
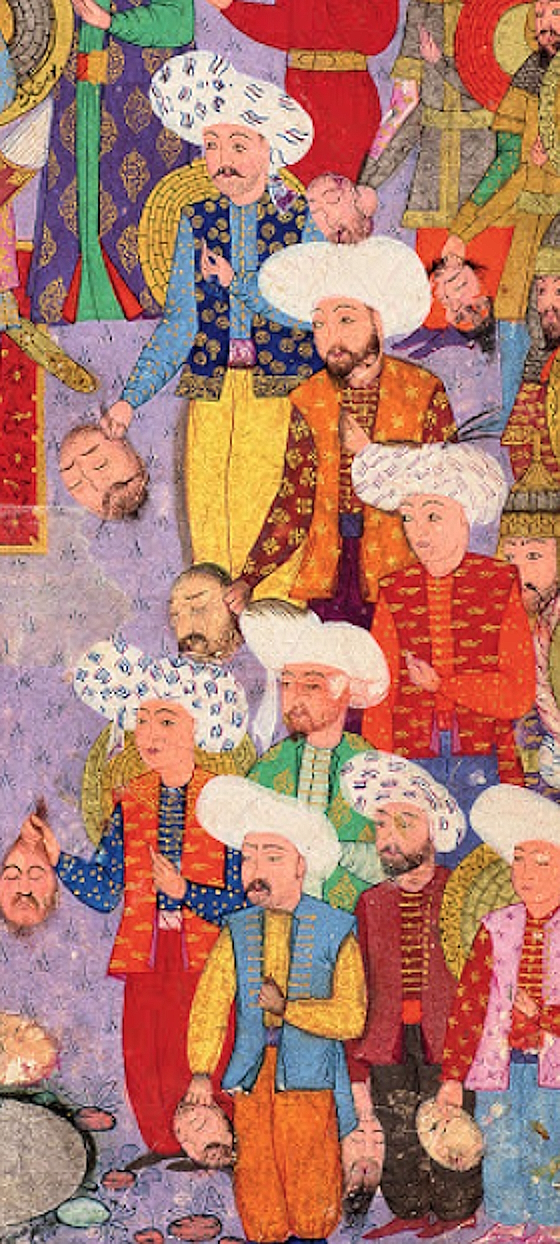
Kurds visiting Lala Mustafa Pasha, in 1581. Nusretname

When Sultan Selim I, after defeating Shah Ismail I in 1514, annexed Western Armenia and Kurdistan, he entrusted the organisation of the conquered territories to Idris, the historian, who was a Kurd of Bitlis. He divided the territory into sanjaks or districts, and, making no attempt to interfere with the principle of heredity, installed the local chiefs as governors. He also resettled the rich pastoral country between Erzerum and Erivan, which had lain in waste since the passage of Timur, with Kurds from the Hakkari and Bohtan districts. For the next centuries, from the Peace of Amasya until the first half of the 19th century, several regions of the wide Kurdish homelands would be contested as well between the Ottomans and the neighbouring rival successive Iranian dynasties (Safavids, Afsharids, Qajars) in the frequent Ottoman–Persian Wars.

The Ottoman centralist policies in the beginning of the 19th century aimed to remove power from the principalities and localities, which directly affected the Kurdish emirs. Bedirhan Bey was the last emir of the Cizre Bohtan Emirate after initiating an uprising in 1847 against the Ottomans to protect the current structures of the Kurdish principalities. Although his uprising is not classified as a nationalist one, his children played significant roles in the emergence and the development of Kurdish nationalism through the next century.

The first modern Kurdish nationalist movement emerged in 1880 with an uprising led by a Kurdish landowner and head of the powerful Shemdinan family, Sheik Ubeydullah, who demanded political autonomy or outright independence for Kurds as well as the recognition of a Kurdistan state without interference from Turkish or Persian authorities. The uprising against Qajar Persia and the Ottoman Empire was ultimately suppressed by the Ottomans and Ubeydullah, along with other notables, were exiled to Istanbul.

=== Kurdish nationalism of the 20th century ===
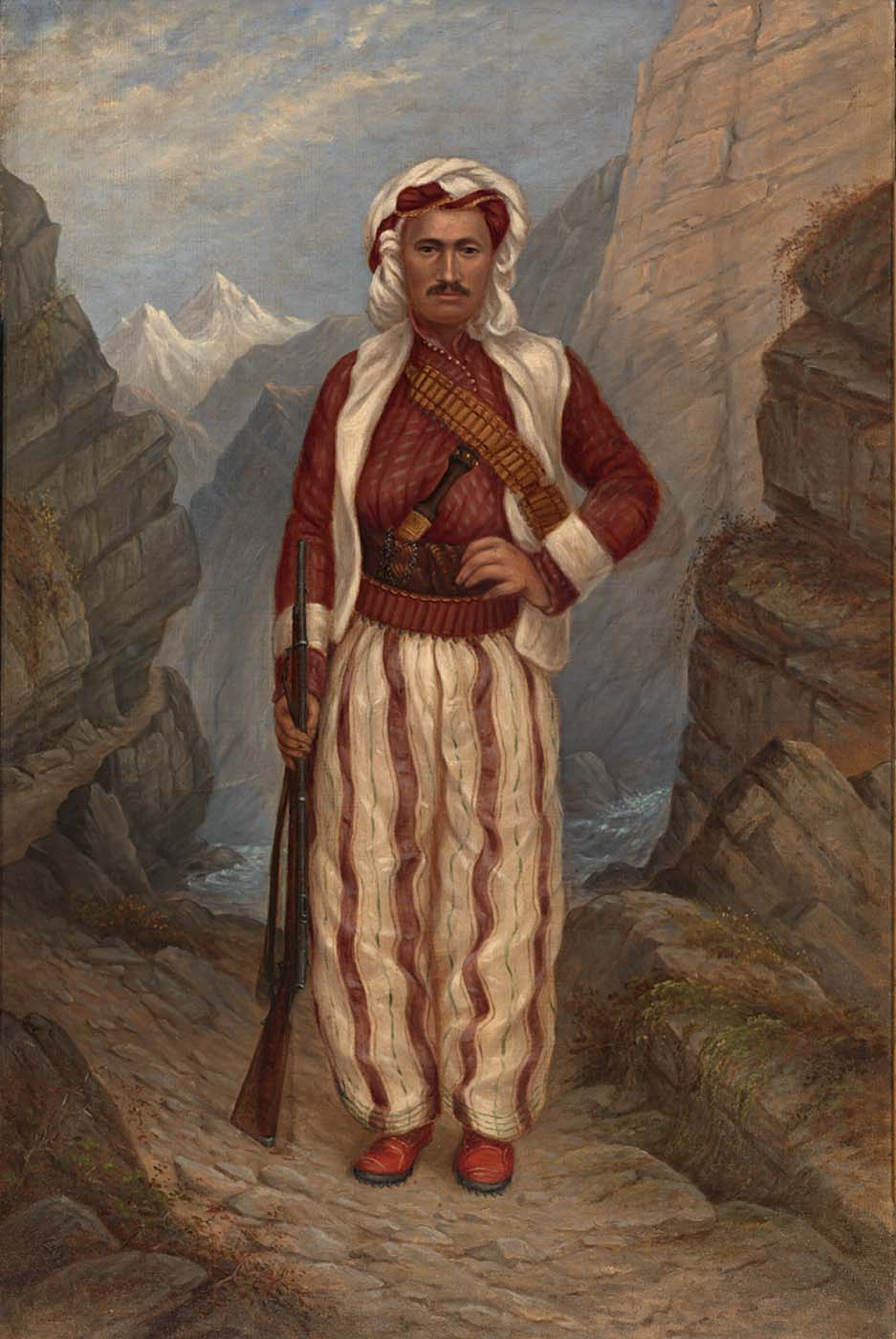
Impression of a Kurdish man by American artist Antonio Zeno Shindle circa 1893

Kurdish nationalism emerged after World War I with the dissolution of the Ottoman Empire, which had historically successfully integrated (but not assimilated) the Kurds, through use of forced repression of Kurdish independence movements. Revolts did occur sporadically but only in 1880 with the uprising led by Sheik Ubeydullah did the Kurds as an ethnic group or nation make demands. Ottoman sultan Abdul Hamid II (r. 1876–1909) responded with a campaign of integration by co-opting prominent Kurdish opponents to strengthen Ottoman power with offers of prestigious positions in his government. This strategy appears to have been successful, given the loyalty displayed by the Kurdish Hamidiye regiments during World War I.

The Kurdish ethno-nationalist movement that emerged following World War I and the end of the Ottoman Empire in 1922 largely represented a reaction to the changes taking place in mainstream Turkey, primarily to the radical secularization, the centralization of authority, and to the rampant Turkish nationalism in the new Turkish Republic.

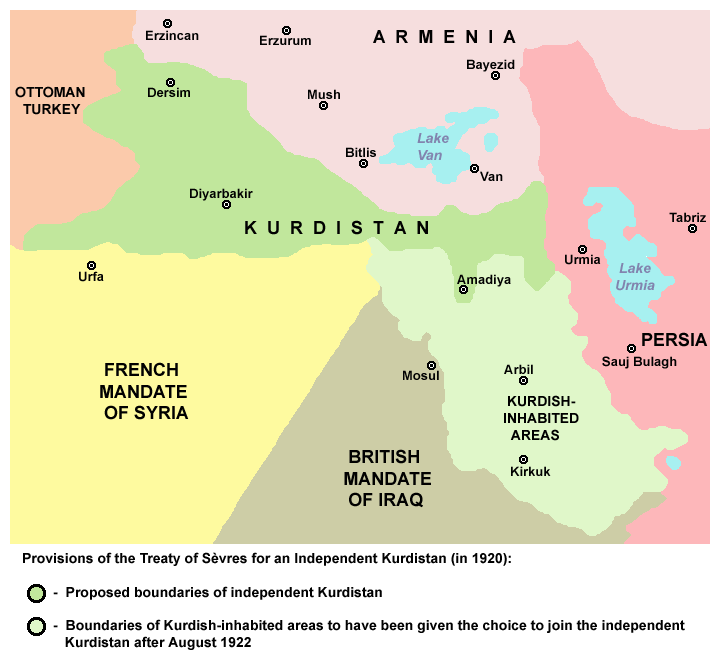
Provisions of the Treaty of Sèvres for an independent Kurdistan (in 1920)

Jakob Künzler, head of a missionary hospital in Urfa, documented the large-scale ethnic cleansing of both Armenians and Kurds by the Young Turks. He has given a detailed account of the deportation of Kurds from Erzurum and Bitlis in the winter of 1916. The Kurds were perceived to be subversive elements who would take the Russian side in the war. In order to eliminate this threat, Young Turks embarked on a large-scale deportation of Kurds from the regions of Djabachdjur, Palu, Musch, Erzurum and Bitlis. Around 300,000 Kurds were forced to move southwards to Urfa and then westwards to Aintab and Marasch. In the summer of 1917 Kurds were moved to Konya in central Anatolia. Through these measures, the Young Turk leaders aimed at weakening the political influence of the Kurds by deporting them from their ancestral lands and by dispersing them in small pockets of exiled communities. By the end of World War I, up to 700,000 Kurds had been forcibly deported and almost half of the displaced perished.

Some of the Kurdish groups sought self-determination and the confirmation of Kurdish autonomy in the 1920 Treaty of Sèvres, but in the aftermath of World War I, Kemal Atatürk prevented such a result. Kurds backed by the United Kingdom declared independence in 1927 and established the Republic of Ararat. Turkey suppressed Kurdist revolts in 1925, 1930, and 1937–1938, while Iran in the 1920s suppressed Simko Shikak at Lake Urmia and Jaafar Sultan of the Hewraman region, who controlled the region between Marivan and north of Halabja. A short-lived Soviet-sponsored Kurdish Republic of Mahabad (January to December 1946) existed in an area of present-day Iran.

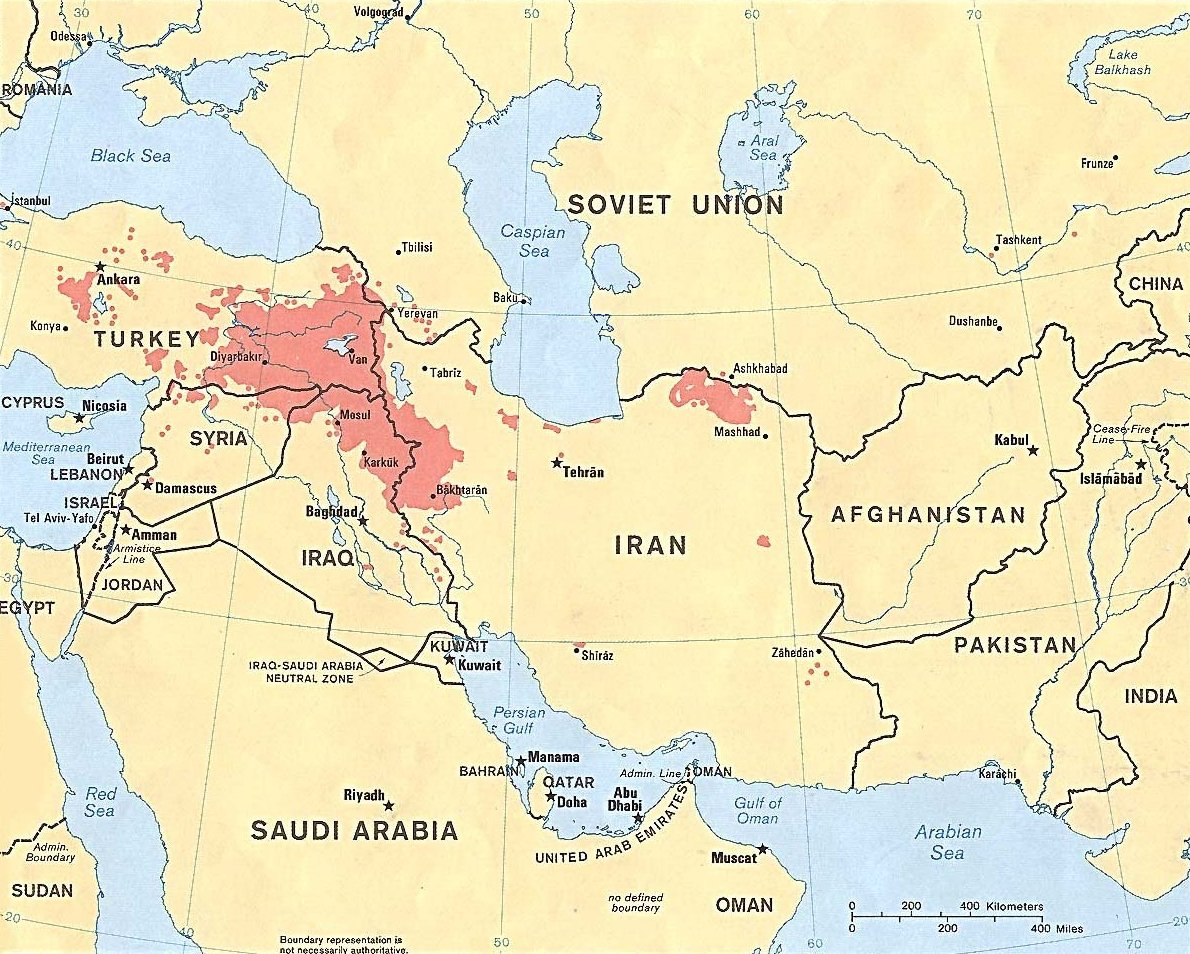
Kurdish-inhabited areas of the Middle East and the Soviet Union in 1986, according to the U.S. Central Intelligence Agency (CIA)

From 1922 to 1924 in Iraq a Kingdom of Kurdistan existed. When Ba'athist administrators thwarted Kurdish nationalist ambitions in Iraq, war broke out in the 1960s. In 1970, the Kurds rejected limited territorial self-rule within Iraq, demanding larger areas, including the oil-rich Kirkuk region.

During the 1920s and 1930s, several large-scale Kurdish revolts took place in Kurdistan. Following these rebellions, the area of Turkish Kurdistan was put under martial law and many of the Kurds were displaced. The Turkish government also encouraged resettlement of Albanians from Kosovo and Assyrians in the region to change the make-up of the population. These events and measures led to long-lasting mutual distrust between Ankara and the Kurds.

Kurdish officers from the Iraqi army [...] were said to have approached Soviet army authorities soon after their arrival in Iran in 1941 and offered to form a Kurdish volunteer force to fight alongside the Red Army. This offer was declined.

During the relatively open government of the 1950s in Turkey, Kurds gained political office and started working within the framework of the Turkish Republic to further their interests, but this move towards integration was halted with the 1960 Turkish coup d'état. The 1970s saw an evolution in Kurdish nationalism as Marxist political thought influenced some in the new generation of Kurdish nationalists opposed to the local feudal authorities who had been a traditional source of opposition to authority; in 1978 Kurdish students would form the militant separatist organization PKK, also known as the Kurdistan Workers' Party in English. The Kurdistan Workers' Party later abandoned Marxism-Leninism.

Kurds are often regarded as "the largest ethnic group without a state". Some researchers, such as Martin van Bruinessen, argue that while some level of Kurdish cultural, social, political and ideological heterogeneity may exist, the Kurdish community has long thrived over the centuries as a generally peaceful and well-integrated part of Turkish society, with hostilities erupting only in recent years. Michael Radu, who worked for the United States' Pennsylvania Foreign Policy Research Institute, writes that demands for a Kurdish state come primarily from Kurdish nationalists, Western human-rights activists, and European leftists.

== Kurdish communities ==
=== Turkey ===
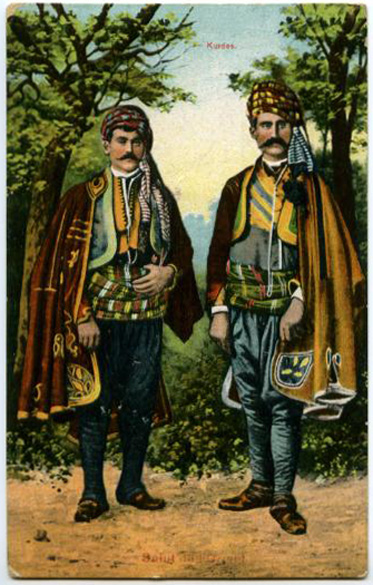
Two Kurds From Constantinople 1899

According to the official data of the 1935 census, the number of people whose mother tongue was Kurdish was 1,480,246 people, or 9.16%, and according to the official data of the 1965 census, it was 2,219,502, or 6.9%. The difference between the 1965 and 1935 censuses was that in the 1935 census, Zazaki was considered a sub-branch of Kurdish, while in the 1965 census it was considered a separate language and was counted separately. According to the CIA World Factbook, Kurds formed approximately 18% of the population in Turkey (approximately 14 million) in 2008. One Western source estimates that up to 25% of the Turkish population is Kurdish (approximately 18–19 million people). Kurdish sources claim there are as many as 20 or 25 million Kurds in Turkey. In 1980, Ethnologue estimated the number of Kurdish-speakers in Turkey at around five million, when the country's population stood at 44 million. Rudaw, in its report prepared based on Türkiye's census data in February 2024, stated that the total population of Kurdish-majority regions in Türkiye is around 17 million. Kurds form the largest minority group in Turkey, and they have posed the most serious and persistent challenge to the official image of a homogeneous society. To deny the existence of Kurds, the Turkish Government used several terms. "Mountain Turks" was a term was initially used by Abdullah Alpdoğan. In 1961, in a foreword to the book Doğu İlleri ve Varto Tarihi of Mehmet Şerif Fırat, the Turkish president Cemal Gürsel declared it of utmost importance to prove the Turkishness of the Kurds. Eastern Turk was another euphemism for Kurds from 1980 onwards. Nowadays the Kurds, in Turkey, are still known under the name Easterner (Doğulu).

Several large-scale Kurdish revolts in 1925, 1930 and 1938 were suppressed by the Turkish government and more than one million Kurds were forcibly relocated between 1925 and 1938. The use of Kurdish language, dress, folklore, and names were banned and the Kurdish-inhabited areas remained under martial law until 1946. The Ararat revolt, which reached its apex in 1930, was only suppressed after a massive military campaign including destruction of many villages and their populations. By the 1970s, Kurdish leftist organizations such as the Kurdistan Socialist Party-Turkey (KSP-T) emerged in Turkey which were against violence and supported civil activities and participation in elections. In 1977, Mehdi Zana a supporter of KSP-T won the mayoralty of Diyarbakir in the local elections. At about the same time, generational fissures gave birth to two new organizations: the National Liberation of Kurdistan and the Kurdistan Workers' Party (PKK).

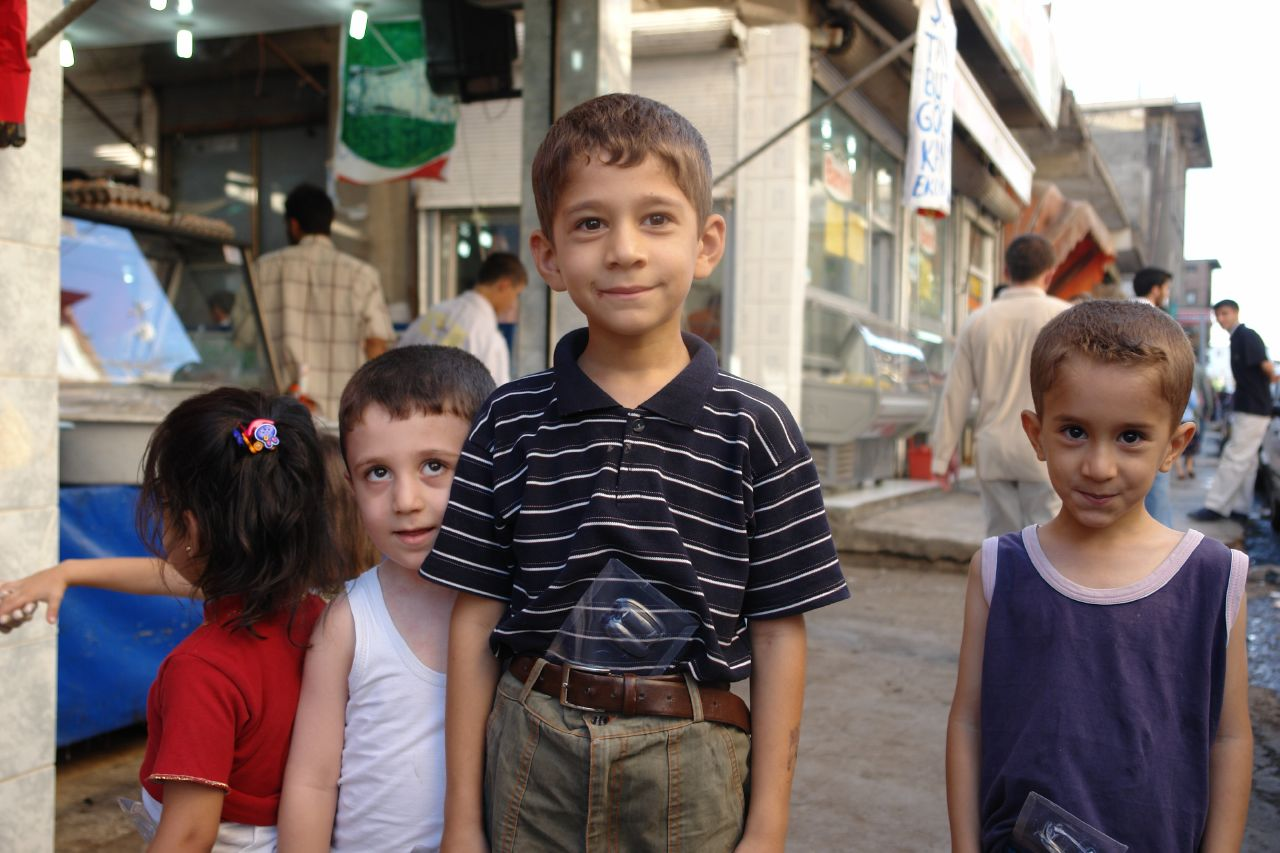
Kurdish boys in Diyarbakir

The words "Kurds", "Kurdistan", or "Kurdish" were officially banned by the Turkish government. Following the military coup of 1980, the Kurdish language was officially prohibited in public and private life. Many people who spoke, published, or sang in Kurdish were arrested and imprisoned. The Kurds are still not allowed to get a primary education in their mother tongue and they do not have a right to self-determination, even though Turkey has signed the ICCPR. There is ongoing discrimination against and "otherization" of Kurds in society.

The Kurdistan Workers' Party or PKK (Kurdish: Partiya Karkerên Kurdistanê) is Kurdish militant organization which has waged an armed struggle against the Turkish state for cultural and political rights and self-determination for the Kurds. Turkey's military allies the US, the EU, and NATO label the PKK as a terrorist organization while the UN, Switzerland, and Russia have refused to add the PKK to their terrorist list. Some of them have even supported the PKK.

Between 1984 and 1999, the PKK and the Turkish military engaged in open war, and much of the countryside in the southeast was depopulated, as Kurdish civilians moved from villages to bigger cities such as Diyarbakır, Van, and Şırnak, as well as to the cities of western Turkey and even to western Europe. The causes of the depopulation included mainly the Turkish state's military operations, state's political actions, Turkish deep state actions, the poverty of the southeast and PKK atrocities against Kurdish clans which were against them. Turkish state actions have included torture, rape, forced inscription, forced evacuation, destruction of villages, illegal arrests and executions of Kurdish civilians.

Since the 1970s, the European Court of Human Rights has condemned Turkey for the thousands of human rights abuses. The judgments are related to executions of Kurdish civilians, torturing, forced displacements systematic destruction of villages, arbitrary arrests murdered and disappeared Kurdish journalists.

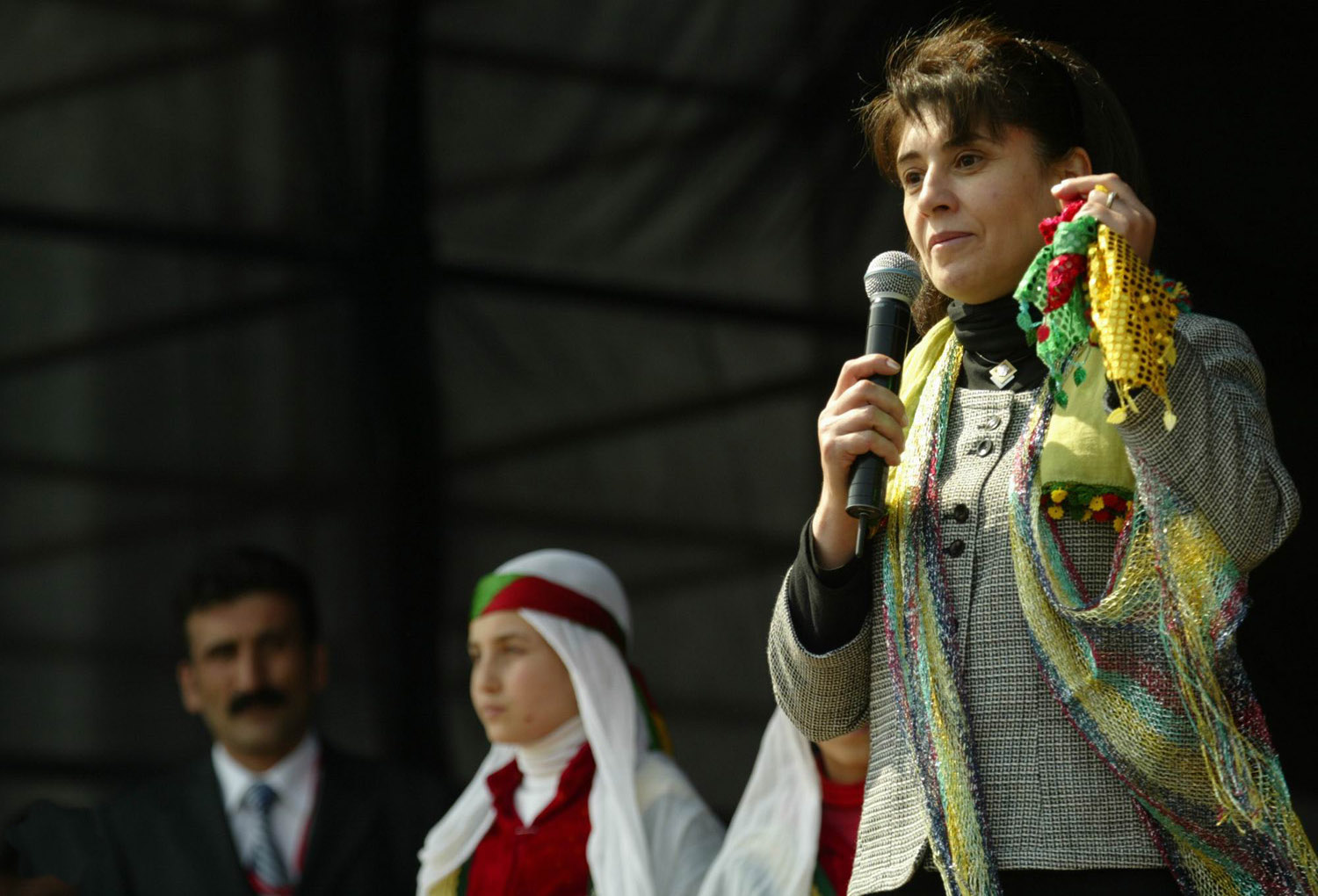
Leyla Zana

Leyla Zana, the first Kurdish female MP from Diyarbakir, caused an uproar in Turkish Parliament after adding the following sentence in Kurdish to her parliamentary oath during the swearing-in ceremony in 1994: "I take this oath for the brotherhood of the Turkish and Kurdish peoples."

In March 1994, the Turkish Parliament voted to lift the immunity of Zana and five other Kurdish DEP members: Hatip Dicle, Ahmet Turk, Sirri Sakik, Orhan Dogan and Selim Sadak. Zana, Dicle, Sadak and Dogan were sentenced to 15 years in jail by the Supreme Court in October 1995. Zana was awarded the Sakharov Prize for human rights by the European Parliament in 1995. She was released in 2004 amid warnings from European institutions that the continued imprisonment of the four Kurdish MPs would affect Turkey's bid to join the EU. The 2009 local elections resulted in 5.7% for Kurdish political party DTP.

Officially protected death squads are accused of the disappearance of 3,200 Kurds and Assyrians in 1993 and 1994 in the so-called "mystery killings". Kurdish politicians, human-rights activists, journalists, teachers and other members of intelligentsia were among the victims. Virtually none of the perpetrators were investigated nor punished. Turkish government also encouraged Islamic extremist group Kurdish Hezbollah to assassinate suspected PKK members and often ordinary Kurds. Azimet Köylüoğlu, the state minister of human rights, revealed the extent of security forces' excesses in the autumn of 1994: "While acts of terrorism in other regions are done by the PKK; in Tunceli it is state terrorism. In Tunceli, it is the state that is evacuating and burning villages. In the southeast there are two million people left homeless."

=== Iran ===
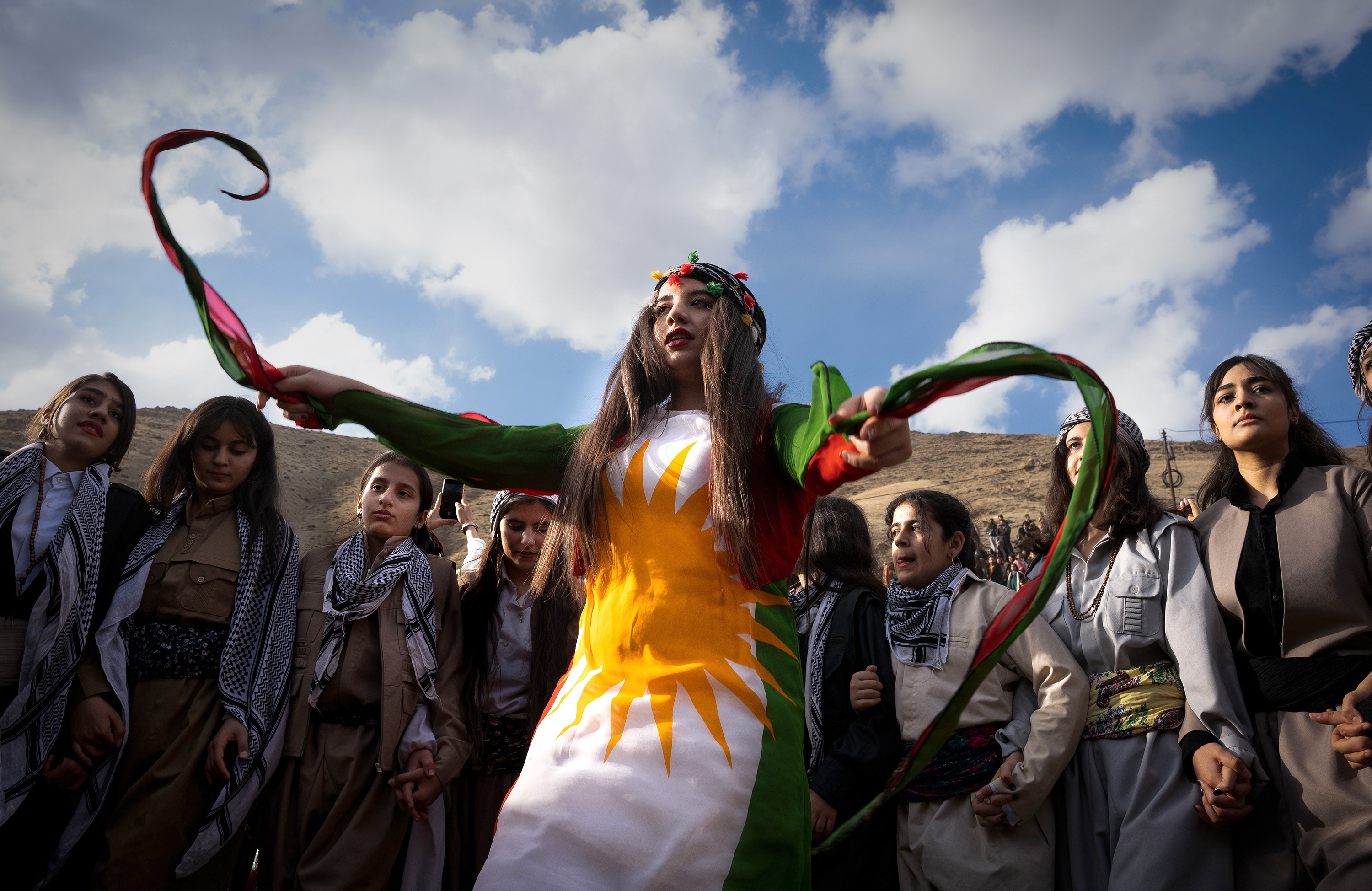
Kurdish women in Iranian Kurdistan

The Kurdish region of Iran has been a part of the country since ancient times. Nearly all Kurdistan was part of Safavid Iran until its Western part was lost during wars against the Ottoman Empire. Following the dissolution of the Ottoman Empire, at the Paris Peace Conference of 1919 Tehran had demanded all lost territories including Turkish Kurdistan, Mosul, and even Diyarbakır, but demands were quickly rejected by Western powers. This area has been divided by modern Turkey, Syria and Iraq. Today, the Kurds inhabit mostly northwestern territories known as Iranian Kurdistan but also the northeastern region of Khorasan, and constitute approximately 7–10% of Iran's overall population (6.5–7.9 million), compared to 10.6% (2 million) in 1956 and 8% (800,000) in 1850.

Unlike in other Kurdish-populated countries, there are strong ethnolinguistic and cultural ties between Kurds, Persians and others as Iranian peoples. Some modern Iranian dynasties like the Safavids and Zands are considered to be partly of Kurdish origin. Kurdish literature in all of its forms (Kurmanji, Sorani, and Gorani) has developed within historical Iranian boundaries under strong influence of the Persian language.

According to Philip Kreyenbroek and Stefan Sperl, "The government of Iran has never employed the same level of brutality against its own Kurds like Turkey or Iraq, but it has always been implacably opposed to any suggestion of Kurdish separatism." During and shortly after World War I, the government of Iran was ineffective and had very little control over events in the country and several Kurdish tribal chiefs gained local political power, even established large confederations. At the same time waves of nationalism from the disintegrating Ottoman Empire partly influenced some Kurdish chiefs in border regions to pose as Kurdish nationalist leaders. Prior to this, identity in both countries largely relied upon religion, i.e., Shia Islam in the particular case of Iran. In 19th-century Iran, Shia–Sunni animosity and the describing of Sunni Kurds as an Ottoman fifth column was quite frequent.

During the late 1910s and early 1920s, tribal revolt led by Kurdish chieftain Simko Shikak struck northwestern Iran. Although elements of Kurdish nationalism were present in this movement, historians agree these were hardly articulate enough to justify a claim that recognition of Kurdish identity was a major issue in Simko's movement, and he had to rely heavily on conventional tribal motives. Government forces and non-Kurds were not the only ones to suffer in the attacks, the Kurdish population was also robbed and assaulted. Rebels do not appear to have felt any sense of unity or solidarity with fellow Kurds. Kurdish insurgency and seasonal migrations in the late 1920s, along with long-running tensions between Tehran and Ankara, resulted in border clashes and even military penetrations in both Iranian and Turkish territory. Two regional powers have used Kurdish tribes as tool for own political benefits: Turkey has provided military help and refuge for anti-Iranian Turcophone Shikak rebels in 1918–1922, while Iran did the same during Ararat rebellion against Turkey in 1930. Reza Shah's military victory over Kurdish and Turkic tribal leaders initiated a repressive era toward non-Iranian minorities. The government's forced detribalization and sedentarization in the 1920s and 30s resulted with many other tribal revolts in Iranian regions of Azerbaijan, Lorestan and Kurdistan. In the particular case of the Kurds, these repressive policies partly contributed to the development of nationalism among some tribes.

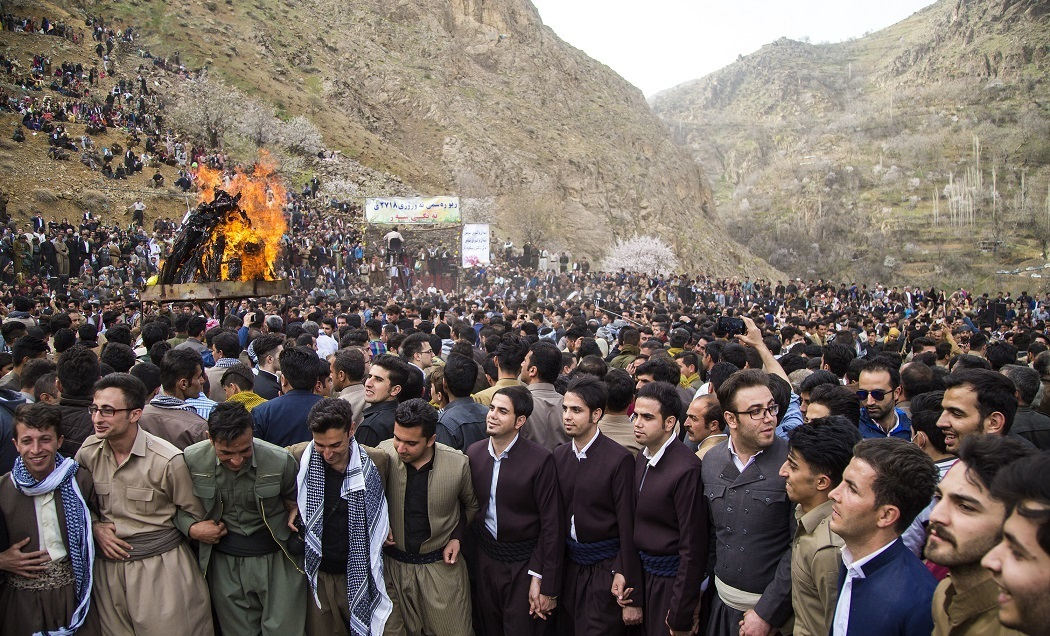
Iranian Kurds celebrating Newroz, 20 March 2018

As a response to growing Pan-Turkism and Pan-Arabism in region which were seen as potential threats to the territorial integrity of Iran, Pan-Iranist ideology has been developed in the early 1920s. Some of such groups and journals openly advocated Iranian support to the Kurdish rebellion against Turkey. The secular Pahlavi dynasty endorsed Iranian ethnic nationalism which saw the Kurds as an integral part of the Iranian nation. Mohammad Reza Pahlavi personally praised the Kurds as "pure Iranians" or "one of the most noble Iranian peoples". Another significant ideology during this period was Marxism which arose among Kurds under influence of USSR. It culminated in the Iran crisis of 1946 which included a separatist attempt of KDP-I and communist groups to establish the Soviet puppet government called Republic of Mahabad. It arose along with Azerbaijan People's Government, another Soviet puppet state. The state itself encompassed a very small territory, including Mahabad and the adjacent cities, unable to incorporate the southern Iranian Kurdistan which fell inside the Anglo-American zone, and unable to attract the tribes outside Mahabad itself to the nationalist cause. As a result, when the Soviets withdrew from Iran in December 1946, government forces were able to enter Mahabad unopposed.

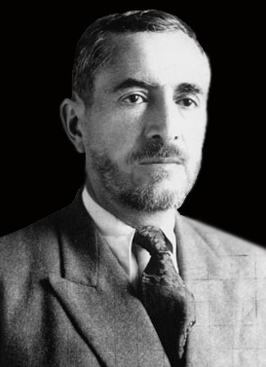
Qazi Muhammad, the president of the Republic of Kurdistan

Several nationalist and Marxist insurgencies continued for decades (1967, 1979, 1989–96) led by KDP-I and Komalah, but those two organization have never advocated a separate Kurdish state or greater Kurdistan as did the PKK in Turkey. Still, many of dissident leaders, among others Qazi Muhammad and Abdul Rahman Ghassemlou, were executed or assassinated. During the Iran–Iraq War, Tehran provided support for Iraqi-based Kurdish groups like KDP or PUK, along with asylum for 1.4 million Iraqi refugees, mostly Kurds. Kurdish Marxist groups have been marginalized in Iran since the dissolution of the Soviet Union. In 2004, new insurrection started by PJAK, separatist organization affiliated with the Turkey-based PKK and designated as terrorist by Iran, Turkey and the United States. Some analysts claim PJAK do not pose any serious threat to the government of Iran. Cease-fire has been established in September 2011 following the Iranian offensive on PJAK bases, but several clashes between PJAK and IRGC took place after it. Since the Iranian Revolution of 1979, accusations of "discrimination" by Western organizations and of "foreign involvement" by Iranian side have become very frequent.

Kurds have been well integrated in Iranian political life under various governments. Kurdish liberal political Karim Sanjabi served as minister of education under Mohammad Mossadegh in 1952. During the reign of Mohammad Reza Pahlavi some members of parliament and high army officers were Kurds, and there was even a Kurdish cabinet minister. During the Pahlavi era, Kurds received many favours from the authorities, for instance to keep their land after the land reforms of 1962. In the early 2000s, presence of thirty Kurdish deputies in the 290-strong parliament has also helped to undermine claims of discrimination. Some of the more influential Kurdish politicians during recent years include former first vice president Mohammad Reza Rahimi and Mohammad Bagher Ghalibaf, Mayor of Tehran and second-placed presidential candidate in 2013. The Kurdish language is today used more than at any other time since the Revolution, including in several newspapers and among schoolchildren. Many Iranian Kurds show no interest in Kurdish nationalism, particularly Kurds of the Shia faith who sometimes even vigorously reject idea of autonomy, preferring direct rule from Tehran. The issue of Kurdish nationalism and Iranian national identity is generally only questioned in the peripheral Kurdish dominated regions where the Sunni faith is prevalent.

=== Iraq ===
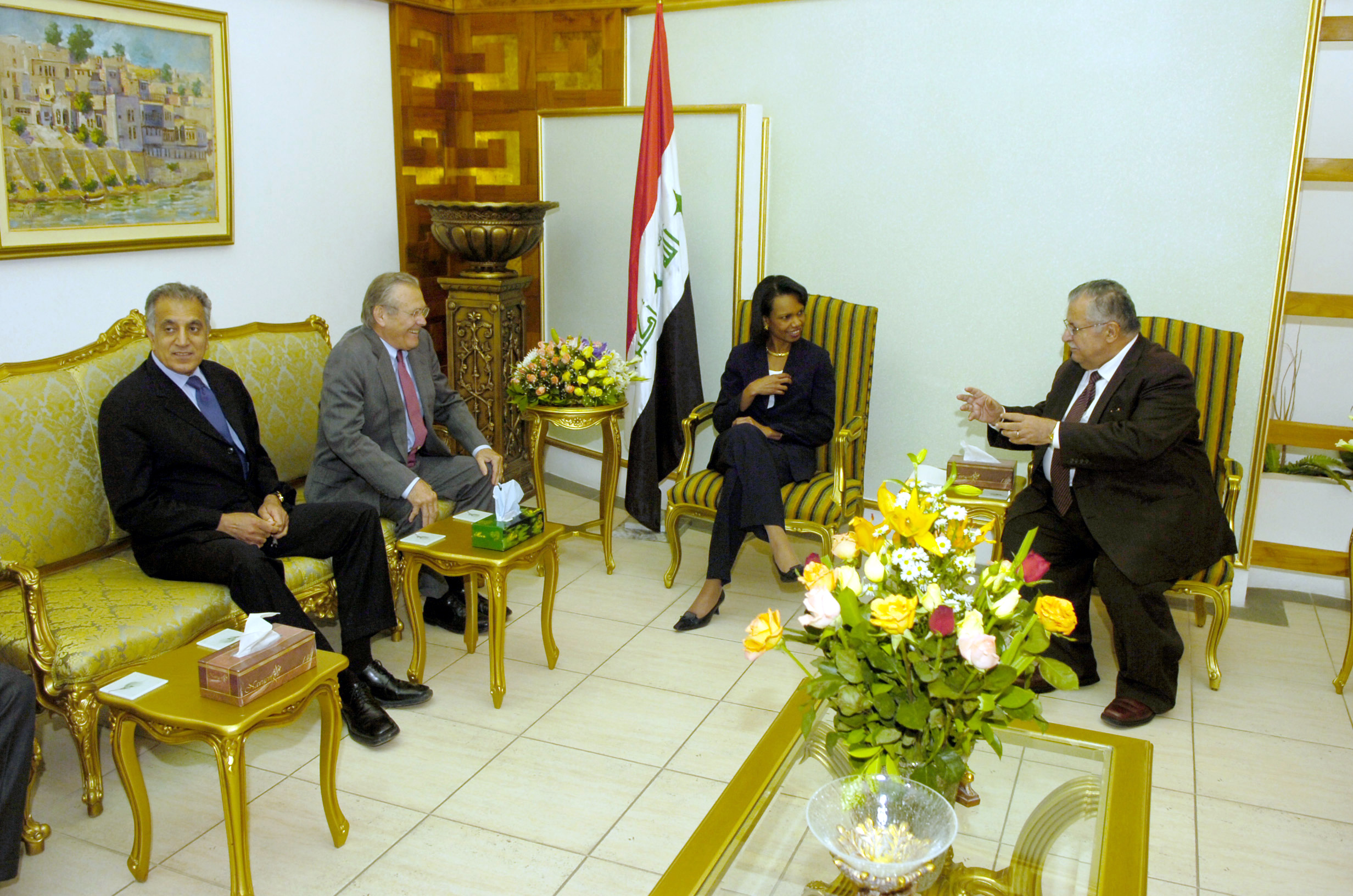
The president of Iraq, Jalal Talabani, meeting with U.S. officials in Baghdad, Iraq, on 26 April 2006

Kurds constitute approximately 17-20% of Iraq's population. They are the majority in at least three provinces in northern Iraq. Kurds also have a presence in Kirkuk, Mosul, Khanaqin, and Baghdad.

Kurds led by Mustafa Barzani were engaged in heavy fighting against successive Iraqi regimes from 1960 to 1975. In March 1970, Iraq announced a peace plan providing for Kurdish autonomy. The plan was to be implemented in four years. However, at the same time, the Iraqi regime started an Arabization program in the oil-rich regions of Kirkuk and Khanaqin. The peace agreement did not last long, and in 1974, the Iraqi government began a new offensive against the Kurds. Moreover, in March 1975, Iraq and Iran signed the Algiers Accord, according to which Iran cut supplies to Iraqi Kurds. Iraq started another wave of Arabization by moving Arabs to the oil fields in Kurdistan, particularly those around Kirkuk. Between 1975 and 1978, 200,000 Kurds were deported to other parts of Iraq.

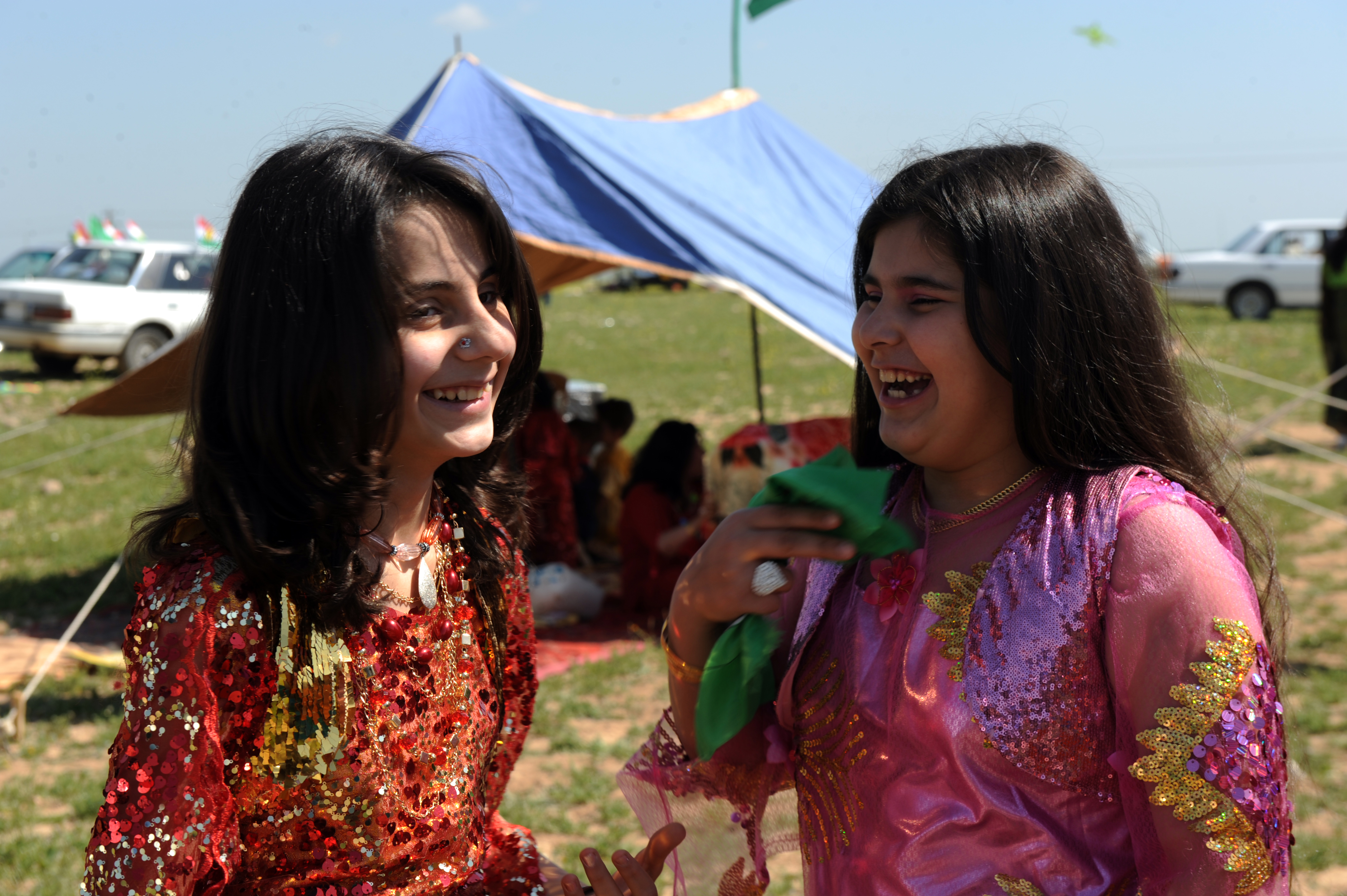
Kurdish girls in traditional Kurdish costume, Newroz picnic in Kirkuk

During the Iran–Iraq War in the 1980s, the regime implemented anti-Kurdish policies and a de facto civil war broke out. Iraq was widely condemned by the international community, but was never seriously punished for oppressive measures such as the mass murder of hundreds of thousands of civilians, the wholesale destruction of thousands of villages and the deportation of thousands of Kurds to southern and central Iraq.

The genocidal campaign, conducted between 1986 and 1989 and culminating in 1988, carried out by the Iraqi government against the Kurdish population was called Anfal ("Spoils of War"). The Anfal campaign led to destruction of over two thousand villages and killing of 182,000 Kurdish civilians. The campaign included the use of ground offensives, aerial bombing, systematic destruction of settlements, mass deportation, firing squads, and chemical attacks, including the most infamous attack on the Kurdish town of Halabja in 1988 that killed 5000 civilians instantly.

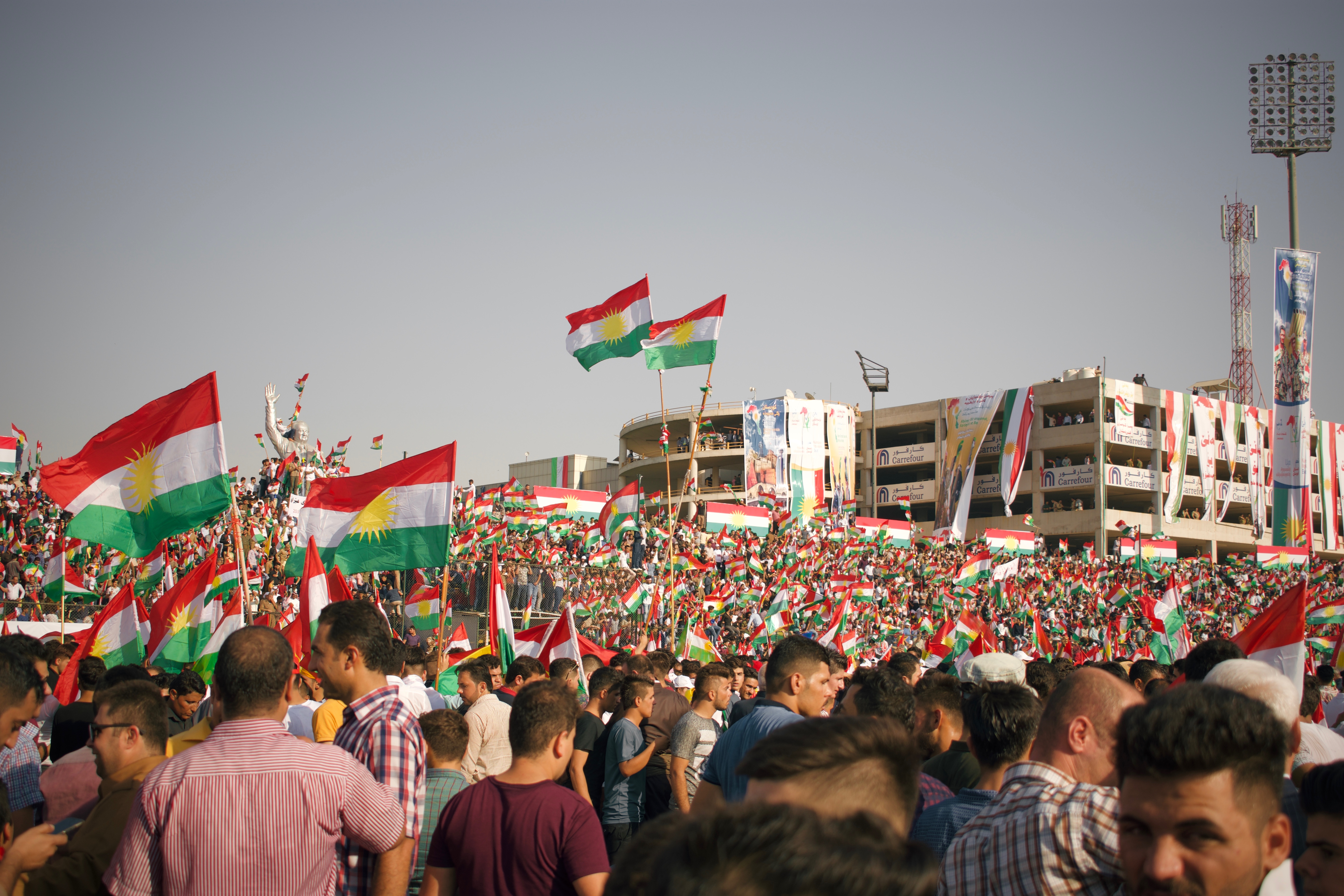
Pro-independence rally in Erbil in September 2017

After the collapse of the Kurdish uprising in March 1991, Iraqi troops recaptured most of the Kurdish areas and 1.5 million Kurds abandoned their homes and fled to the Turkish and Iranian borders. It is estimated that close to 20,000 Kurds succumbed to death due to exhaustion, lack of food, exposure to cold and disease. On 5 April 1991, UN Security Council passed resolution 688 which condemned the repression of Iraqi Kurdish civilians and demanded that Iraq end its repressive measures and allow immediate access to international humanitarian organizations. This was the first international document (since the League of Nations arbitration of Mosul in 1926) to mention Kurds by name. In mid-April, the Coalition established "safe havens" inside Iraqi borders and prohibited Iraqi planes from flying north of 36th parallel. In October 1991, Kurdish guerrillas captured Erbil and Sulaimaniyah after a series of clashes with Iraqi troops. In late October, Iraqi government retaliated by imposing a food and fuel embargo on the Kurds and stopping to pay civil servants in the Kurdish region. The embargo, however, backfired and Kurds held parliamentary elections in May 1992 and established Kurdistan Regional Government (KRG).

The Kurdish population welcomed the American troops in 2003 by holding celebrations and dancing in the streets. The authority of the KRG and legality of its laws and regulations were recognized in the articles 113 and 137 of the new Iraqi Constitution ratified in 2005. By the beginning of 2006, the two Kurdish administrations of Erbil and Sulaimaniya were unified. On 14 August 2007, Yazidis were targeted in a series of bombings that became the deadliest suicide attack since the Iraq War began, killing 796 civilians, wounding 1,562.

=== Syria ===
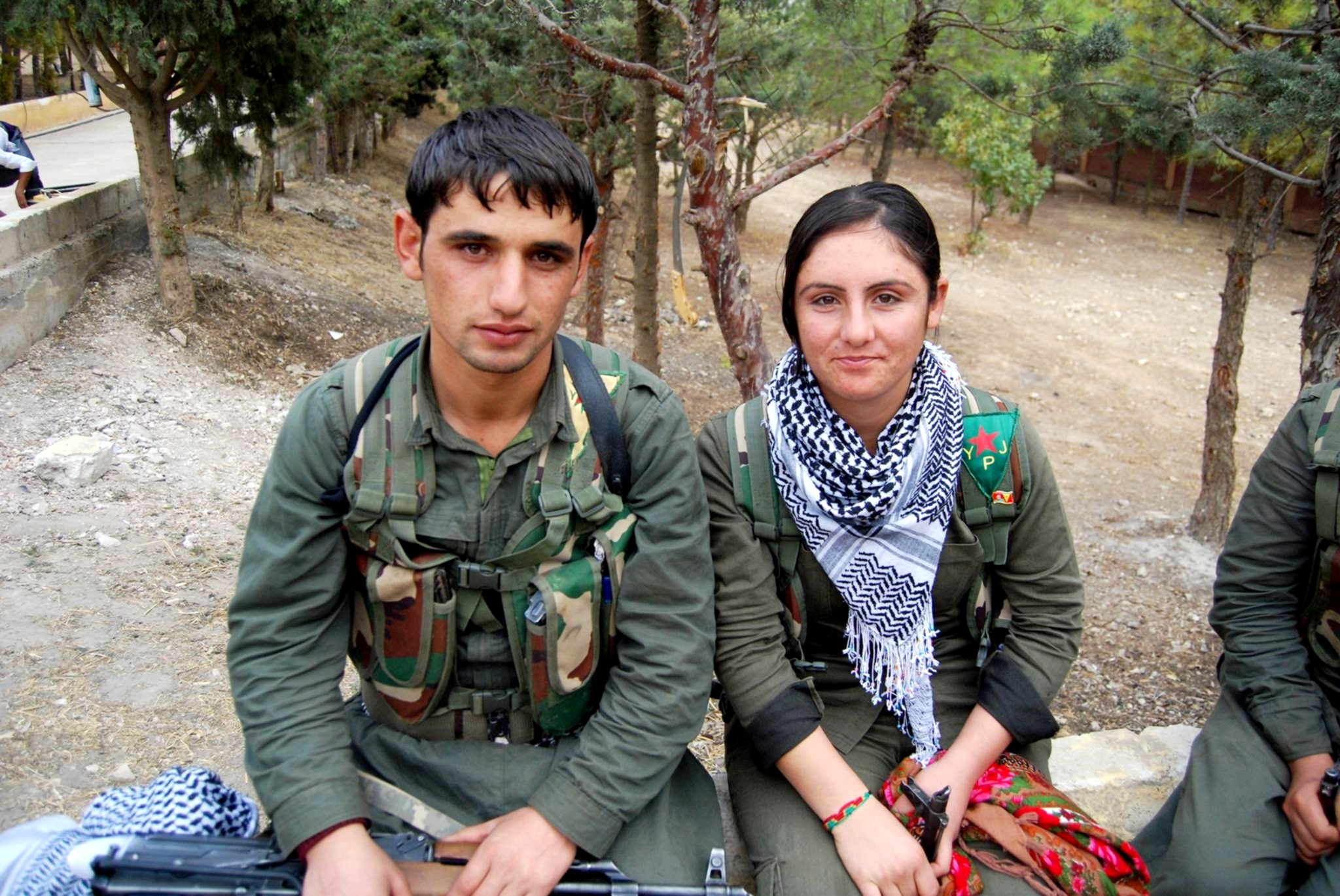
Kurdish YPG and YPJ fighters in Syria

Kurds account for 9% of Syria's population, a total of around 1.6 million people. This makes them the largest ethnic minority in the country. They are mostly concentrated in the northeast and the north, but there are also significant Kurdish populations in Aleppo and Damascus. Kurds often speak Kurdish in public, unless all those present do not. According to Amnesty International, Kurdish human rights activists are mistreated and persecuted. No political parties are allowed for any group, Kurdish or otherwise.

Techniques used to suppress the ethnic identity of Kurds in Syria include various bans on the use of the Kurdish language, refusal to register children with Kurdish names, the replacement of Kurdish place names with new names in Arabic, the prohibition of businesses that do not have Arabic names, the prohibition of Kurdish private schools, and the prohibition of books and other materials written in Kurdish. Having been denied the right to Syrian nationality, around 300,000 Kurds have been deprived of any social rights, in violation of international law. As a consequence, these Kurds are in effect trapped within Syria. In March 2011, in part to avoid further demonstrations and unrest from spreading across Syria, the Syrian government promised to tackle the issue and grant Syrian citizenship to approximately 300,000 Kurds who had been previously denied the right.

On 12 March 2004, beginning at a stadium in Qamishli (a largely Kurdish city in northeastern Syria), clashes between Kurds and Syrians broke out and continued over a number of days. At least thirty people were killed and more than 160 injured. The unrest spread to other Kurdish towns along the northern border with Turkey, and then to Damascus and Aleppo.

As a result of Syrian civil war, since July 2012, Kurds were able to take control of large parts of Syrian Kurdistan from Andiwar in extreme northeast to Jindires in extreme northwest Syria. The Syrian Kurds started the Rojava Revolution in 2013.

Kurdish-inhabited Afrin Canton has been occupied by Turkish Armed Forces and Turkish-backed Free Syrian Army since the Turkish military operation in Afrin in early 2018. Between 150,000 and 200,000 people were displaced due to the Turkish intervention.

In October 2019, Turkey and the Syrian Interim Government began an offensive into Kurdish-populated areas in Syria, prompting about 100,000 civilians to flee from the area fearing that Turkey would commit an ethnic cleansing.

=== Transcaucasus ===
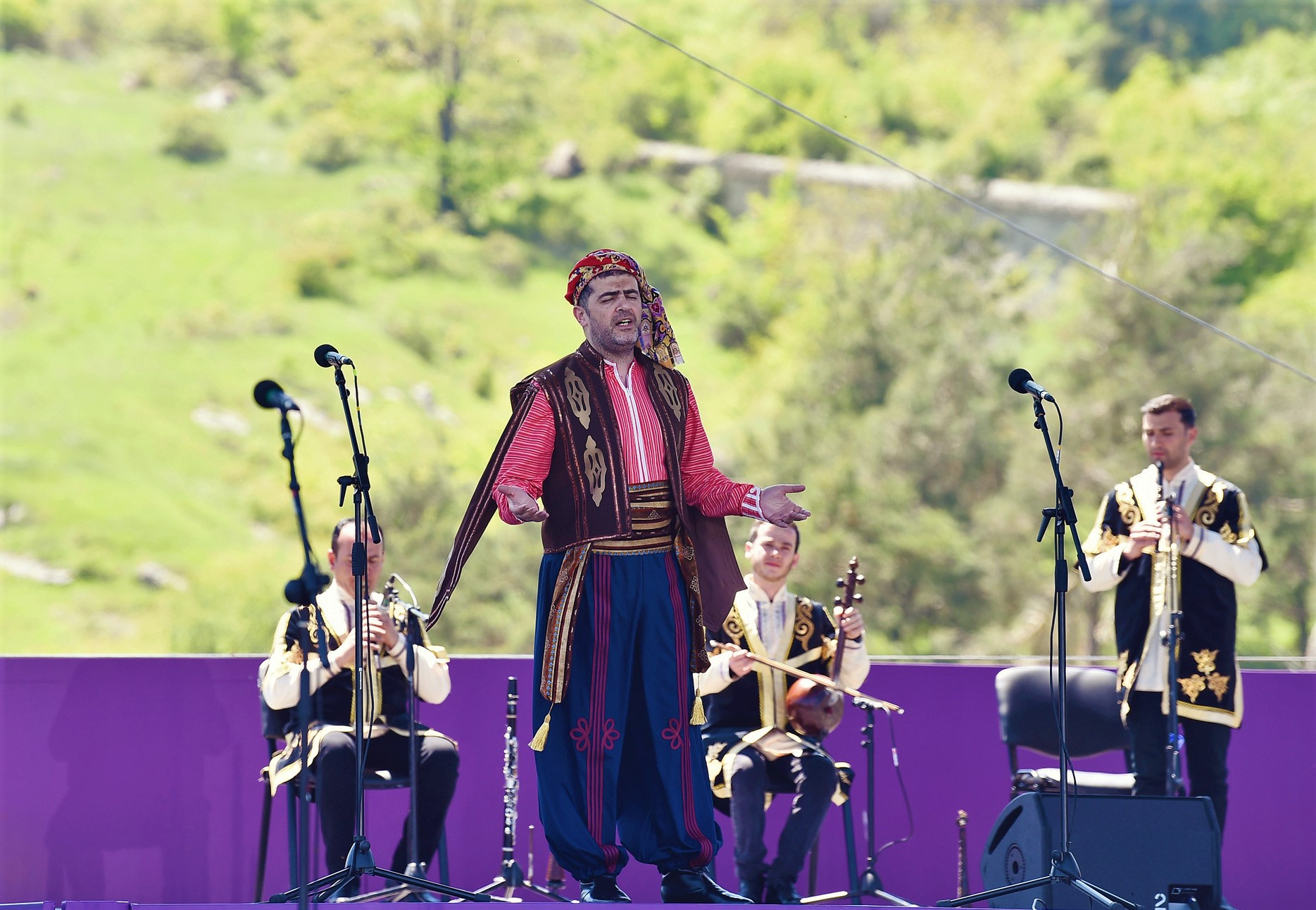
Tunar Rahmanoghly singing Kurdish song "Rinda Min". Khari Bulbul Music Festival

Between the 1930s and 1980s, Armenia was a part of the Soviet Union, within which Kurds, like other ethnic groups, had the status of a protected minority. Armenian Kurds were permitted their own state-sponsored newspaper, radio broadcasts and cultural events. During the conflict in Nagorno-Karabakh, many non-Yazidi Kurds were forced to leave their homes since both the Azeri and non-Yazidi Kurds were Muslim.

In 1920, two Kurdish-inhabited areas of Jewanshir (capital Kalbajar) and eastern Zangazur (capital Lachin) were combined to form the Kurdistan Okrug (or "Red Kurdistan"). The period of existence of the Kurdish administrative unit was brief and did not last beyond 1929. Kurds subsequently faced many repressive measures, including deportations, imposed by the Soviet government. As a result of the Nagorno-Karabakh conflict, many Kurdish areas have been destroyed and more than 150,000 Kurds have been deported since 1988 by separatist Armenian forces.

=== Diaspora ===
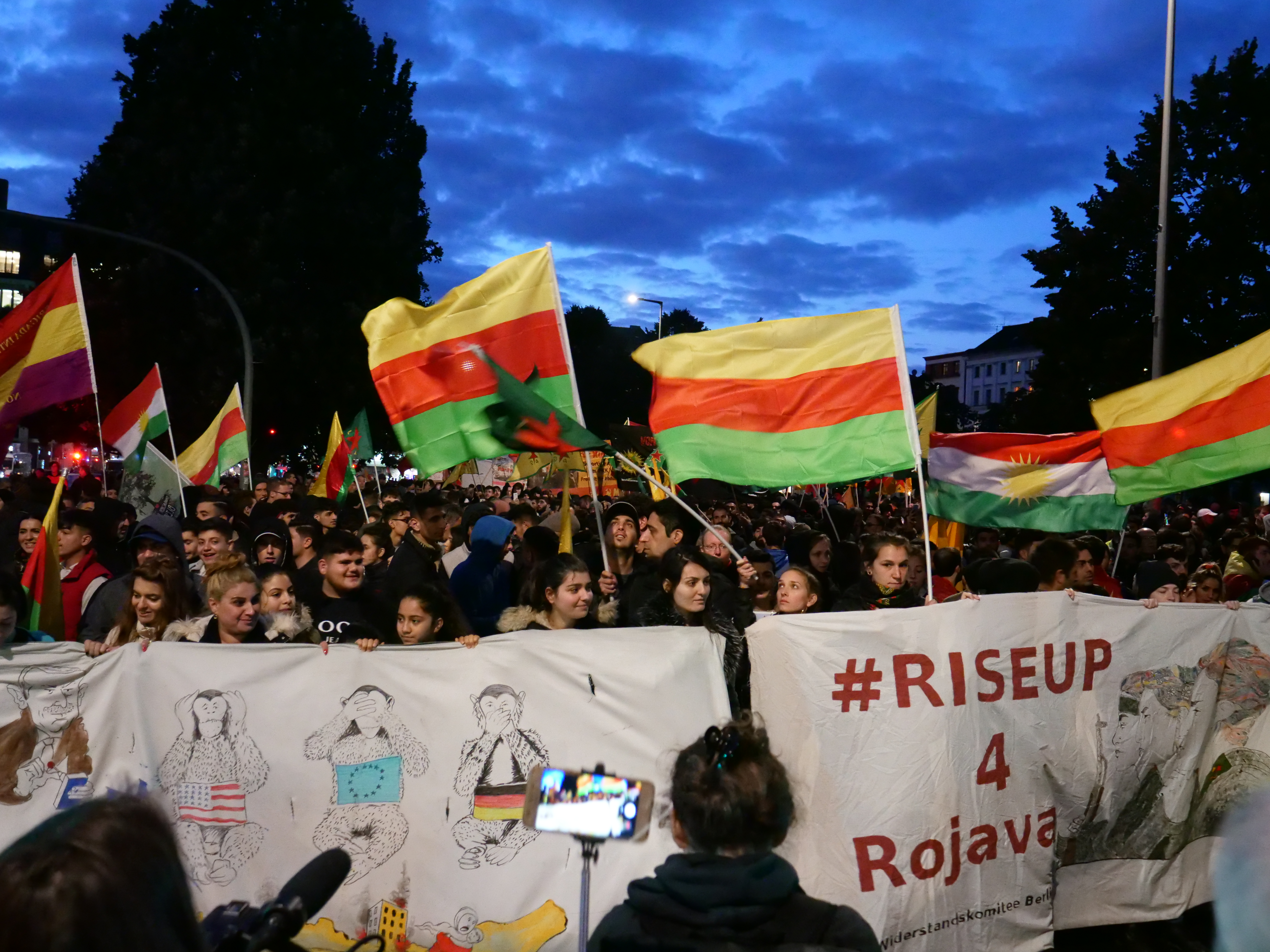
Protest in Berlin, Germany against Turkey's military offensive into north-eastern Syria on 10 October 2019

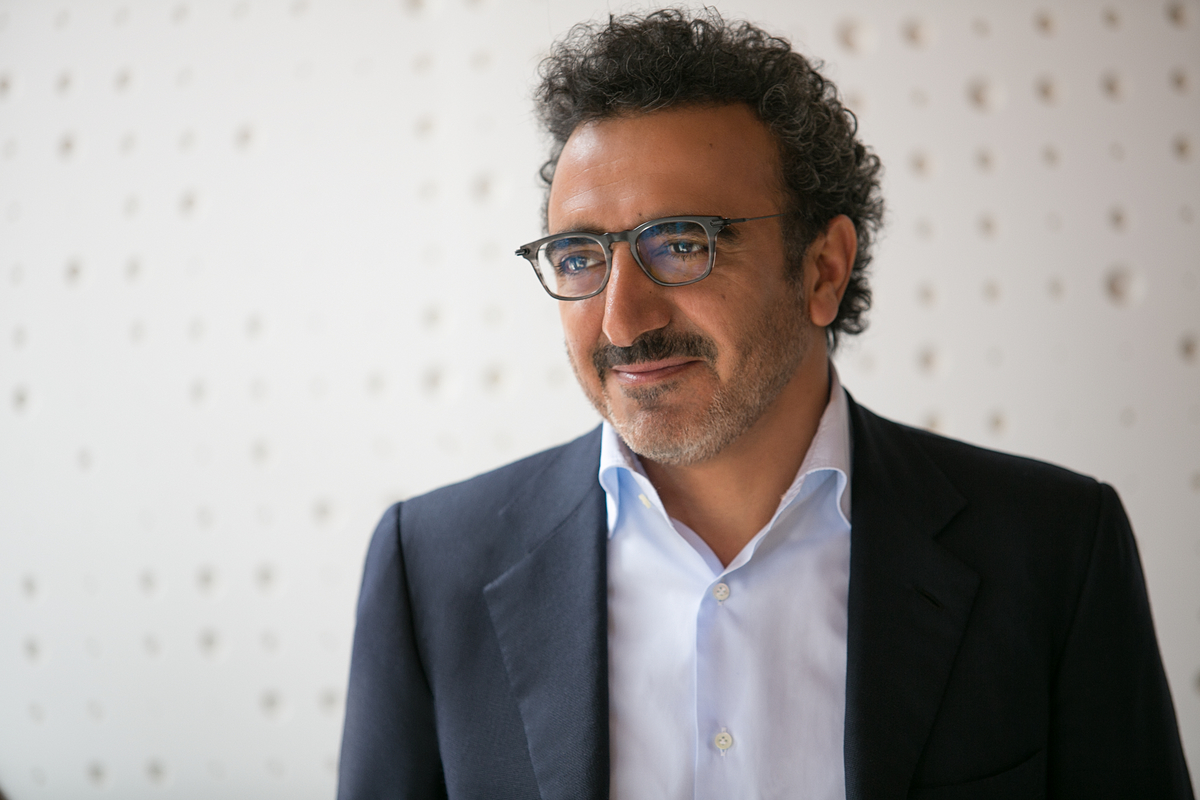
Hamdi Ulukaya, Kurdish-American billionaire, founder and CEO of Chobani

According to a report by the Council of Europe, approximately 1.3 million Kurds live in Western Europe. The earliest immigrants were Kurds from Turkey, who settled in Germany, Austria, the Benelux countries, the United Kingdom, Switzerland and France during the 1960s. Successive periods of political and social turmoil in the region during the 1980s and 1990s brought new waves of Kurdish refugees, mostly from Iran and Iraq under Saddam Hussein, came to Europe. In recent years, many Kurdish asylum seekers from both Iran and Iraq have settled in the United Kingdom (especially in the town of Dewsbury and in some northern areas of London), which has sometimes caused media controversy over their right to remain. There have been tensions between Kurds and the established Muslim community in Dewsbury, which is home to very traditional mosques such as the Markazi. Since the beginning of the turmoil in Syria many of the refugees of the Syrian Civil War are Syrian Kurds and as a result many of the current Syrian asylum seekers in Germany are of Kurdish descent.

There was substantial immigration of ethnic Kurds in Canada and the United States, who are mainly political refugees and immigrants seeking economic opportunity. According to a 2011 Statistics Canada household survey, there were 11,685 people of Kurdish ethnic background living in Canada, and according to the 2011 Census, 10,325 Canadians spoke Kurdish languages. In the United States, Kurdish immigrants started to settle in large numbers in Nashville in 1976, which is now home to the largest Kurdish community in the United States and is nicknamed Little Kurdistan. Kurdish population in Nashville is estimated to be around 11,000. The total number of ethnic Kurds residing in the United States is estimated by the US Census Bureau to be 20,591. Other sources claim that there are 20,000 ethnic Kurds in the United States.

== Culture ==
Kurdish culture is a legacy from the various ancient peoples who shaped modern Kurds and their society. As most other Middle Eastern populations, a high degree of mutual influences between the Kurds and their neighbouring peoples are apparent. Therefore, in Kurdish culture elements of various other cultures are to be seen. However, on the whole, Kurdish culture is closest to that of other Iranian peoples, in particular those who historically had the closest geographical proximity to the Kurds, such as the Persians and Lurs. Kurds, for instance, also celebrate Newroz (21 March) as New Year's Day.

=== Education ===
A madrasa system was used before the modern era. Mele are Islamic clerics and instructors.

=== Women ===
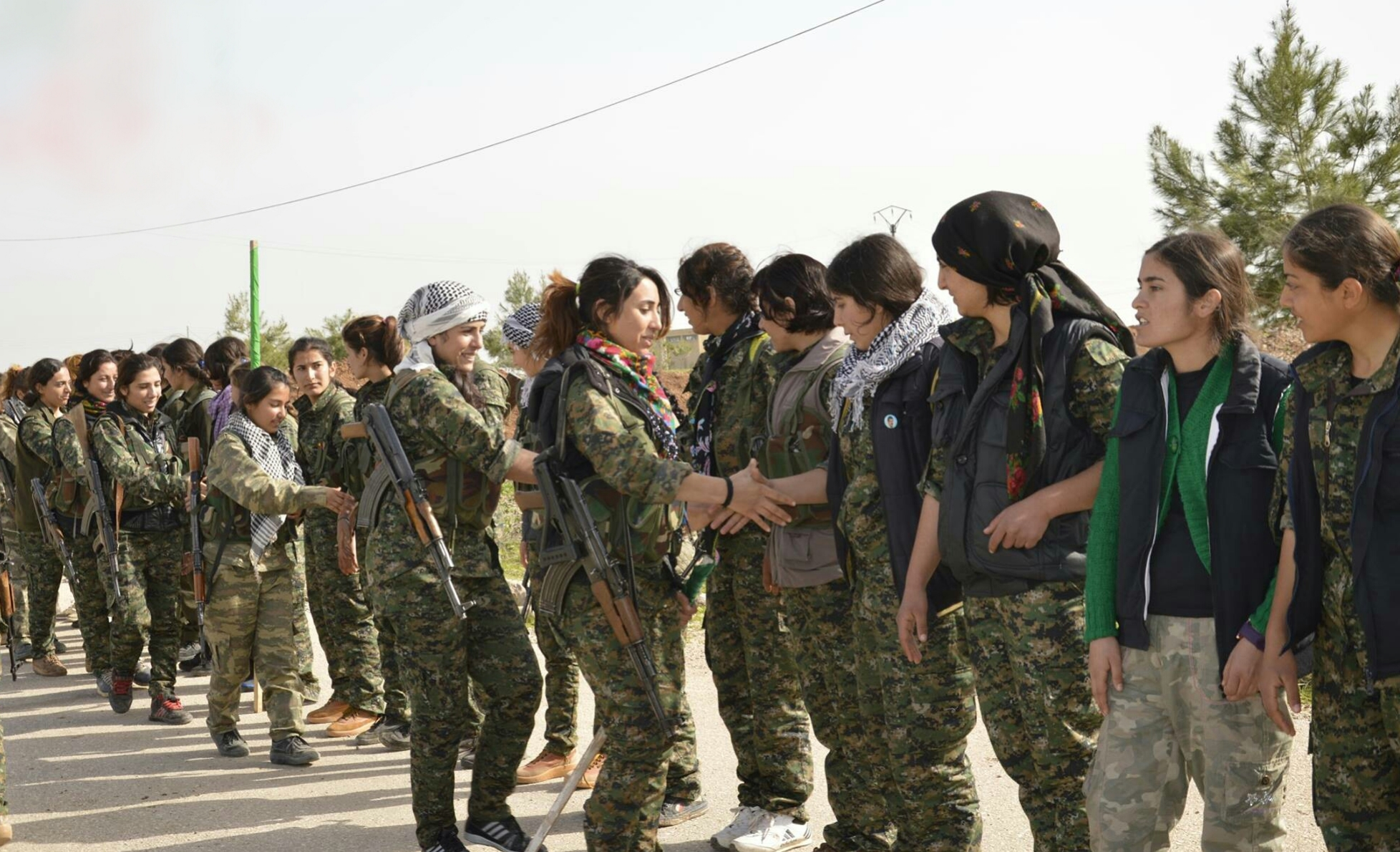
YPG's female fighters in Syria

In general, Kurdish women's rights and equality have improved in the 20th and 21st centuries due to progressive movements within Kurdish society. However, despite the progress, Kurdish and international women's rights organizations still report problems related to gender equality, forced marriages, honor killings, and in Iraq's Erbil, also female genital mutilation (FGM).

=== Folklore ===
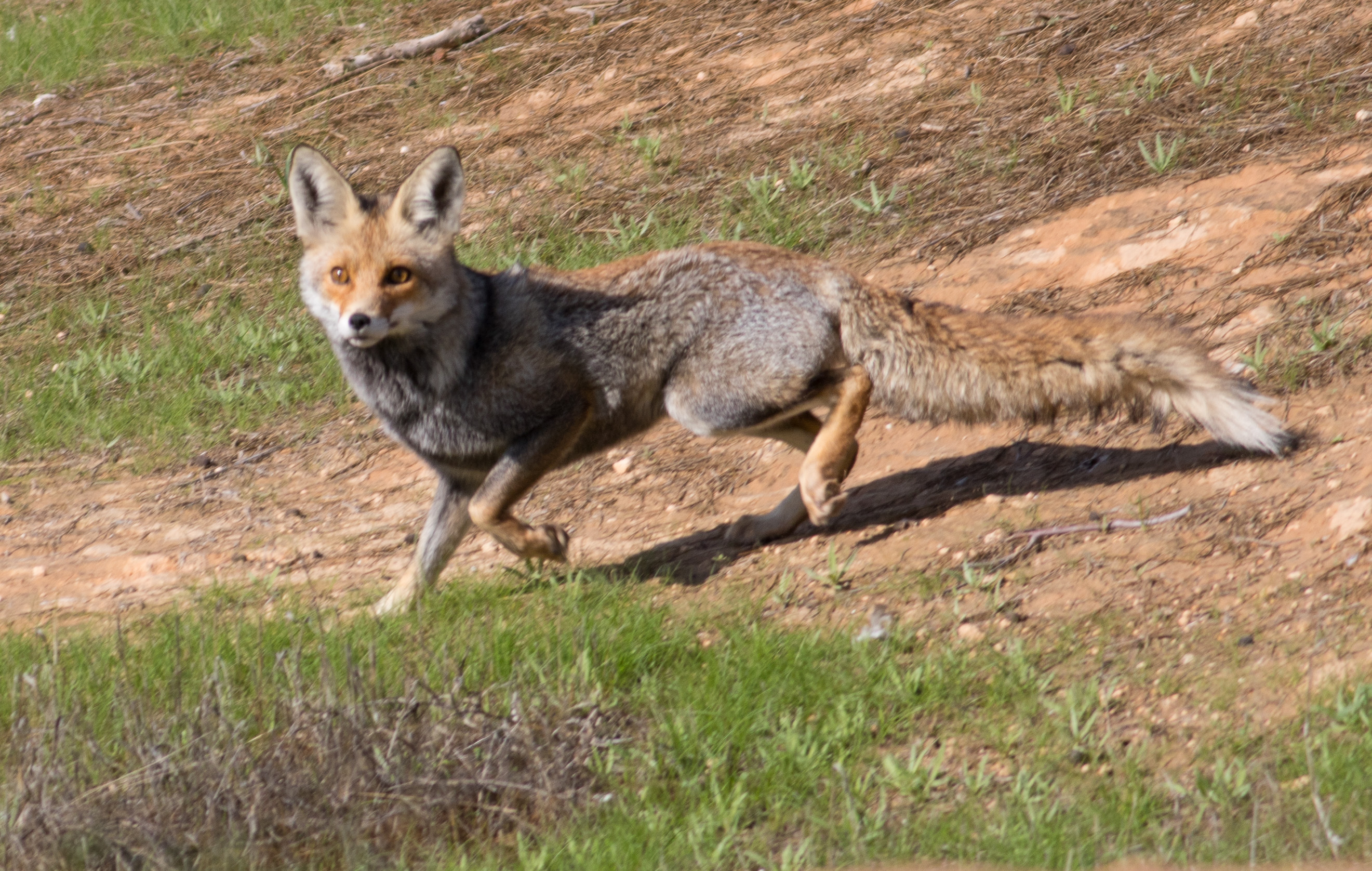
The fox, a widely recurring character in Kurdish tales

The Kurds possess a rich tradition of folklore, which, until recent times, was largely transmitted by speech or song, from one generation to the next. Although some of the Kurdish writers' stories were well known throughout Kurdistan; most of the stories told and sung were only written down in the 20th and 21st centuries. Many of these are, allegedly, centuries old.

Widely varying in purpose and style, among the Kurdish folklore one will find stories about nature, anthropomorphic animals, love, heroes and villains, mythological creatures and everyday life. A number of these mythological figures can be found in other cultures, like the Simurgh and Kaveh the Blacksmith in the broader Iranian Mythology, and stories of Shahmaran throughout Anatolia. Additionally, stories can be purely entertaining, or have an educational or religious aspect.

Perhaps the most widely reoccurring element is the fox, which, through cunning and shrewdness triumphs over less intelligent species, yet often also meets his demise. Another common theme in Kurdish folklore is the origin of a tribe.

Storytellers would perform in front of an audience, sometimes consisting of an entire village. People from outside the region would travel to attend their narratives, and the storytellers themselves would visit other villages to spread their tales. These would thrive especially during winter, where entertainment was hard to find as evenings had to be spent inside.

Coinciding with the heterogeneous Kurdish groupings, although certain stories and elements were commonly found throughout Kurdistan, others were unique to a specific area; depending on the region, religion or dialect. The Kurdish Jews of Zakho are perhaps the best example of this; their gifted storytellers are known to have been greatly respected throughout the region, thanks to a unique oral tradition. Other examples are the mythology of the Yezidis, and the stories of the Dersim Kurds, which had a substantial Armenian influence.

During the criminalization of the Kurdish language after the coup d'état of 1980, dengbêj (singers) and çîrokbêj (tellers) were silenced, and many of the stories had become endangered. In 1991, the language was decriminalized, yet the now highly available radios and TV's had as an effect a diminished interest in traditional storytelling. However, a number of writers have made great strides in the preservation of these tales.

=== Weaving ===
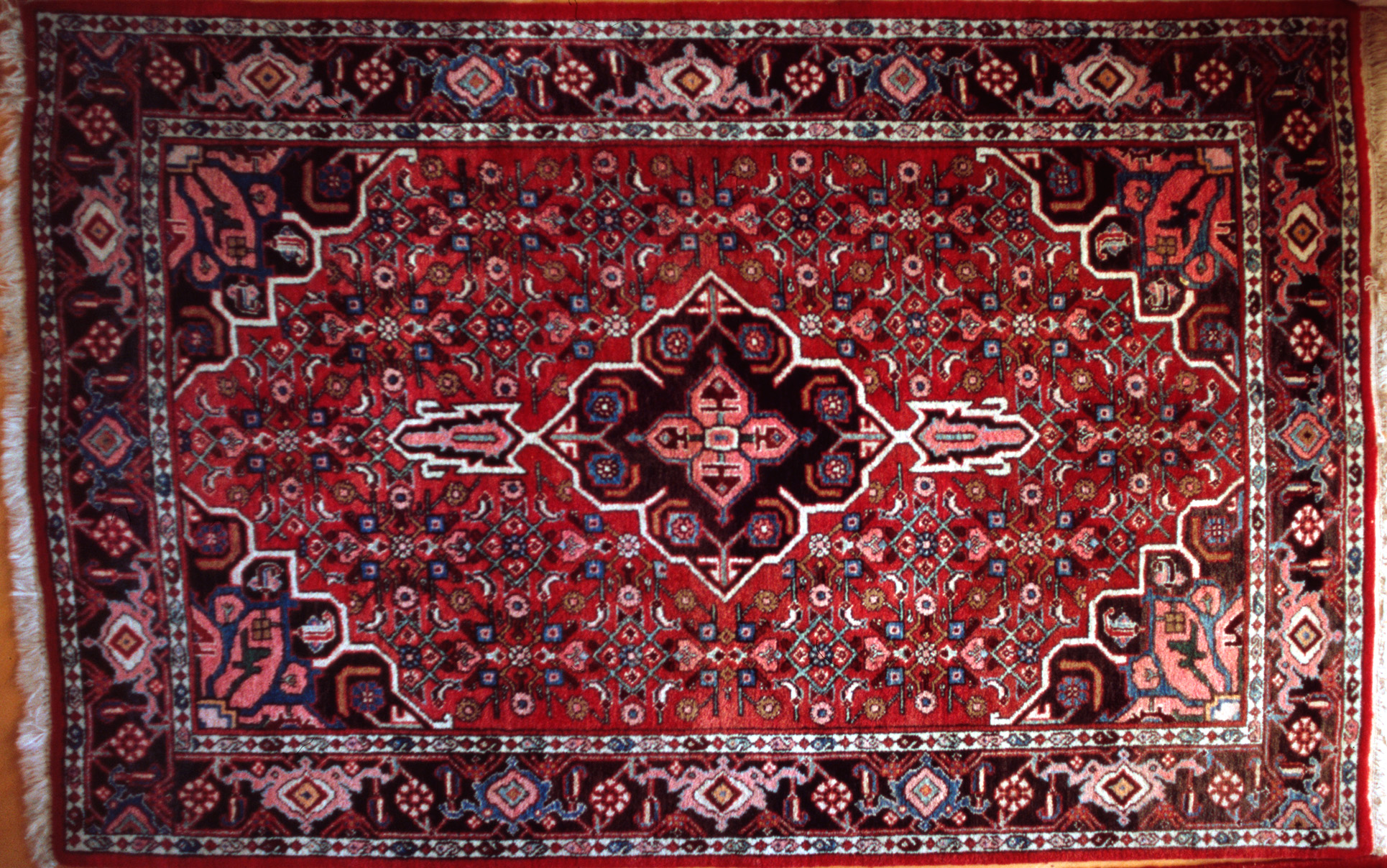
Modern rug from Bijar

Kurdish weaving is renowned throughout the world, with fine specimens of both rugs and bags. The most famous Kurdish rugs are those from the Bijar region, in the Kurdistan Province. Because of the unique way in which the Bijar rugs are woven, they are very stout and durable, hence their appellation as the 'Iron Rugs of Persia'. Exhibiting a wide variety, the Bijar rugs have patterns ranging from floral designs, medallions and animals to other ornaments. They generally have two wefts, and are very colorful in design. With an increased interest in these rugs in the last century, and a lesser need for them to be as sturdy as they were, new Bijar rugs are more refined and delicate in design.

Another well-known Kurdish rug is the Senneh rug, which is regarded as the most sophisticated of the Kurdish rugs. They are especially known for their great knot density and high-quality mountain wool. They lend their name from the region of Sanandaj. Throughout other Kurdish regions like Kermanshah, Siirt, Malatya and Bitlis rugs were also woven to great extent.

Kurdish bags are mainly known from the works of one large tribe: the Jaffs, living in the border area between Iran and Iraq. These Jaff bags share the same characteristics of Kurdish rugs; very colorful, stout in design, often with medallion patterns. They were especially popular in the West during the 1920s and 1930s.

=== Tattoos ===
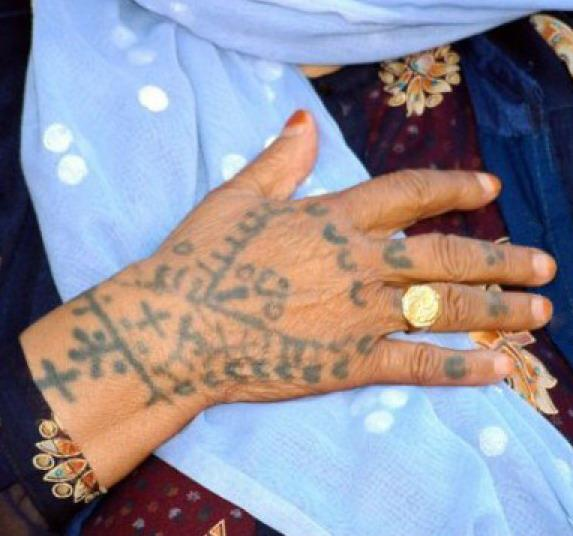
Kurdish woman with deq tattoo

Adorning the body with tattoos (deq in Kurdish) is widespread among the Kurds, even though permanent tattoos are not permissible in Sunni Islam. Therefore, these traditional tattoos are thought to derive from pre-Islamic times.

Tattoo ink is made by mixing soot with (breast) milk and the poisonous liquid from the gall bladder of an animal. The design is drawn on the skin using a thin twig and is injected under the skin using a needle. These have a wide variety of meanings and purposes, among which are protection against evil or illnesses; beauty enhancement; and the showing of tribal affiliations. Religious symbolism is also common among both traditional and modern Kurdish tattoos. Tattoos are more prevalent among women than among men, and were generally worn on feet, the chin, foreheads and other places of the body.

The popularity of permanent, traditional tattoos has greatly diminished among newer generation of Kurds. However, modern tattoos are becoming more prevalent; and temporary tattoos are still being worn on special occasions (such as henna, the night before a wedding) and as tribute to the cultural heritage.

=== Music and dance ===
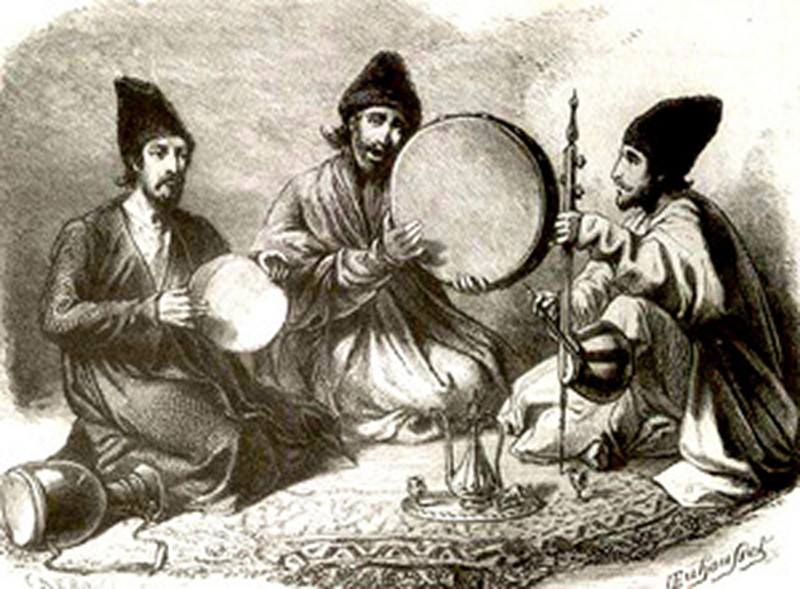
Kurdish musicians, 1890

Traditionally, there are three types of Kurdish classical performers: storytellers (çîrokbêj), minstrels (stranbêj), and bards (dengbêj). No specific music was associated with the Kurdish princely courts. Instead, music performed in night gatherings (şevbihêrk) is considered classical. Several musical forms are found in this genre. Many songs are epic in nature, such as the popular Lawiks, heroic ballads recounting the tales of Kurdish heroes such as Saladin. Heyrans are love ballads usually expressing the melancholy of separation and unfulfilled love. One of the first Kurdish female singers to sing heyrans is Chopy Fatah, while Lawje is a form of religious music and Payizoks are songs performed during the autumn. Love songs, dance music, wedding and other celebratory songs (dîlok/narînk), erotic poetry, and work songs are also popular.

Throughout the Middle East, there are many prominent Kurdish artists. Most famous are Ibrahim Tatlises, Nizamettin Arıç, Ahmet Kaya and the Kamkars. In Europe, well-known artists are Darin Zanyar, Sivan Perwer, and Azad.

=== Cinema ===
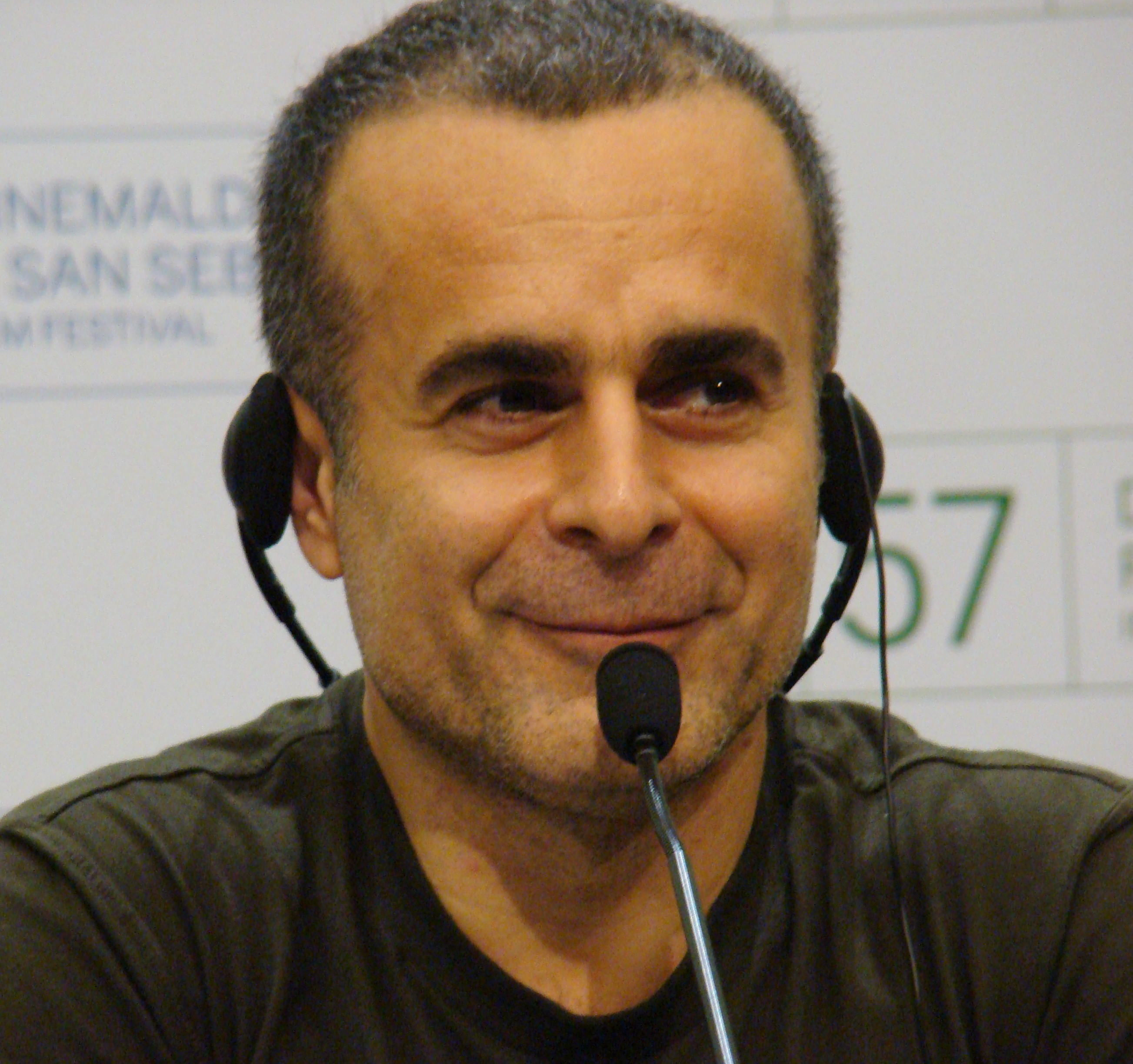
Bahman Ghobadi at the presentation of his film Nobody Knows About Persian Cats in San Sebastián, 2009

The main themes of Kurdish cinema are the poverty and hardship which ordinary Kurds have to endure. The first films featuring Kurdish culture were actually shot in Armenia. Zare, released in 1927, produced by Hamo Beknazarian, details the story of Zare and her love for the shepherd Seydo, and the difficulties the two experience by the hand of the village elder. In 1948 and 1959, two documentaries were made concerning the Yezidi Kurds in Armenia. These were joint Armenian-Kurdish productions; with H. Kocharyan and Heciye Cindi teaming up for The Kurds of Soviet Armenia, and Ereb Samilov and C. Jamharyan for Kurds of Armenia.

The first critically acclaimed and famous Kurdish films were produced by Yılmaz Güney. Initially a popular, award-winning actor in Turkey with the nickname Çirkin Kral (the Ugly King, after his rough looks), he spent the later part of his career producing socio-critical and politically loaded films. Sürü (1979), Yol (1982) and Duvar (1983) are his best-known works, of which the second won Palme d'Or at the Cannes Film Festival of 1982, the most prestigious award in the world of cinema.

Another prominent Kurdish film director is Bahman Qubadi. His first feature film was A Time for Drunken Horses, released in 2000. It was critically acclaimed and went on to win multiple awards. Other movies of his would follow this example, making him one of the best-known film producers of Iran of today. Recently, he released Rhinos Season, starring Behrouz Vossoughi, Monica Bellucci and Yilmaz Erdogan, detailing the tumultuous life of a Kurdish poet.

Other prominent Kurdish film directors that are critically acclaimed include Mahsun Kırmızıgül, Hiner Saleem and the aforementioned Yilmaz Erdogan. There have also been a number of films set or filmed in Kurdistan made by non-Kurdish film directors, such as The Wind Will Carry Us, Triage, The Exorcist, and The Market: A Tale of Trade.

=== Sports ===
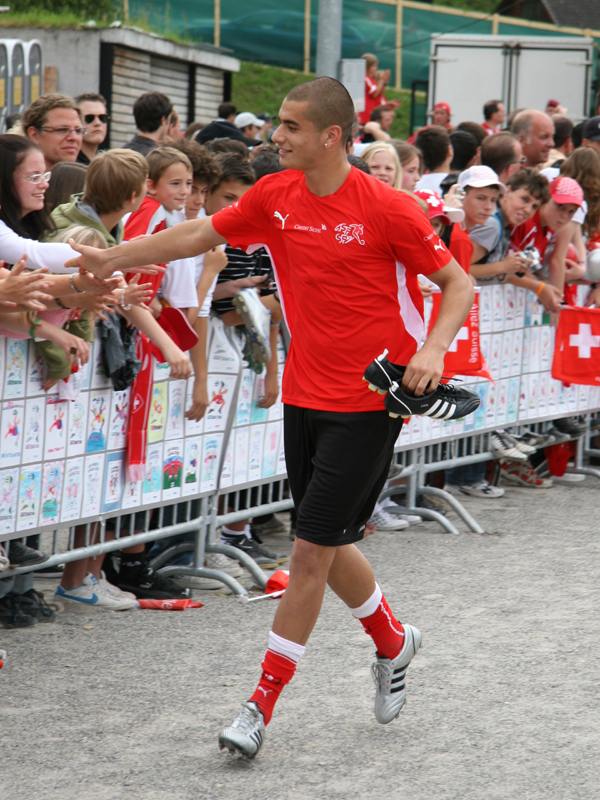
Eren Derdiyok, a Kurdish footballer, striker for the Swiss national football team

The most popular sport among the Kurds is football. Because the Kurds have no independent state, they have no representative team in FIFA or the AFC; however a team representing Iraqi Kurdistan has been active in the Viva World Cup since 2008. They became runners-up in 2009 and 2010, before ultimately becoming champion in 2012.

On a national level, the Kurdish clubs of Iraq have achieved success in recent years as well, winning the Iraqi Premier League four times in the last five years. Prominent clubs are Erbil SC, Duhok SC, Sulaymaniyah FC and Zakho FC.

In Turkey, a Kurd named Celal Ibrahim was one of the founders of Galatasaray S.K. in 1905, as well as one of the original players. The most prominent Kurdish-Turkish club is Diyarbakirspor. In the diaspora, the most successful Kurdish club is Dalkurd FF and the most famous player is Eren Derdiyok.

Another prominent sport is wrestling. In Iranian Wrestling, there are three styles originating from Kurdish regions:

- Zhir-o-Bal (a style similar to Greco-Roman wrestling), practised in Kurdistan, Kermanshah and Ilam;
- Zouran-Patouleh, practised in Kurdistan;
- Zouran-Machkeh, practised in Kurdistan as well.

Furthermore, the most accredited of the traditional Iranian wrestling styles, the Bachoukheh, derives its name from a local Khorasani Kurdish costume in which it is practised.

Kurdish medalists in the 2012 Summer Olympics were Nur Tatar, Kianoush Rostami and Yezidi Misha Aloyan; who won medals in taekwondo, weightlifting and boxing, respectively.

=== Architecture ===
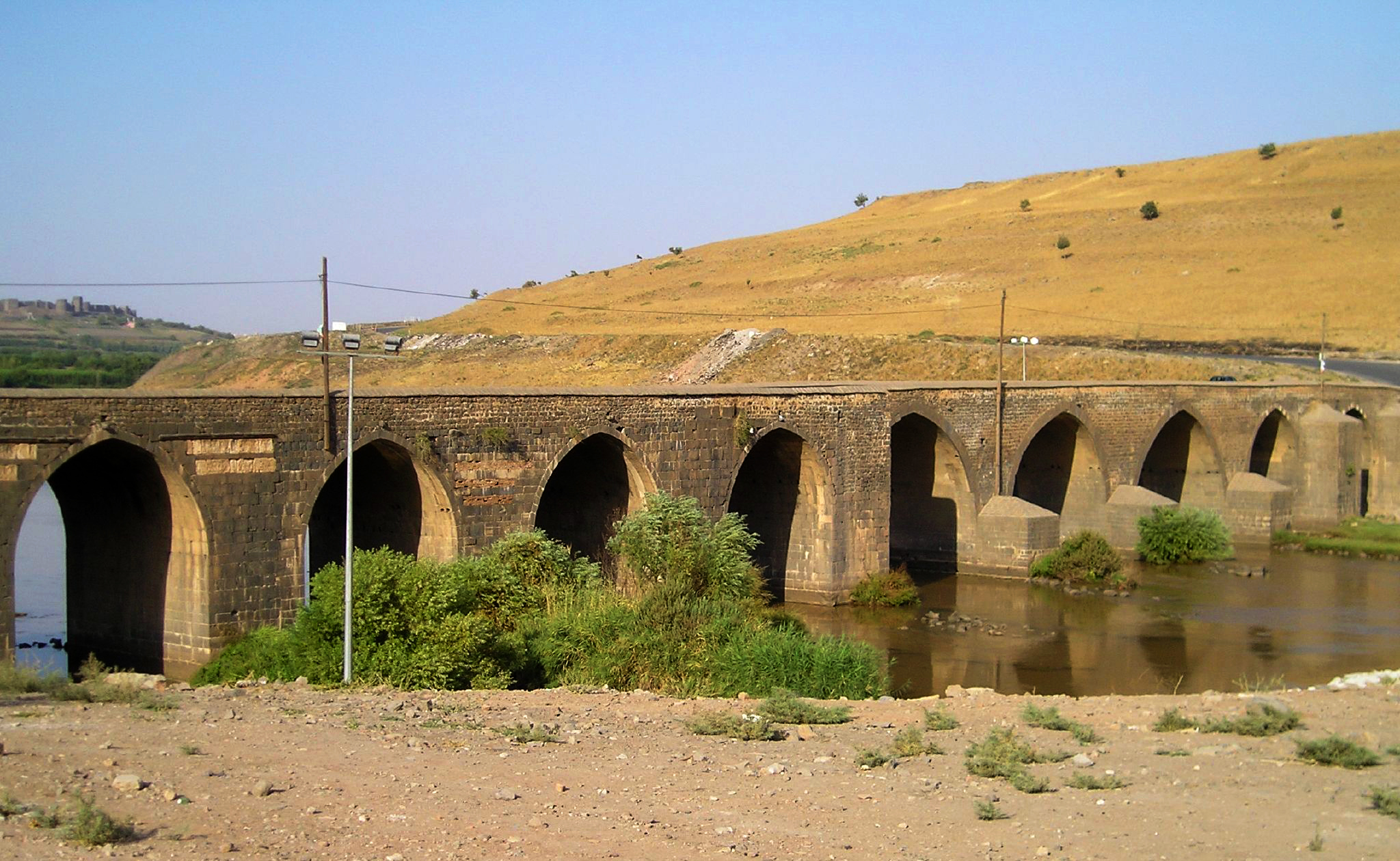
The Marwanid Dicle Bridge, Diyarbakir

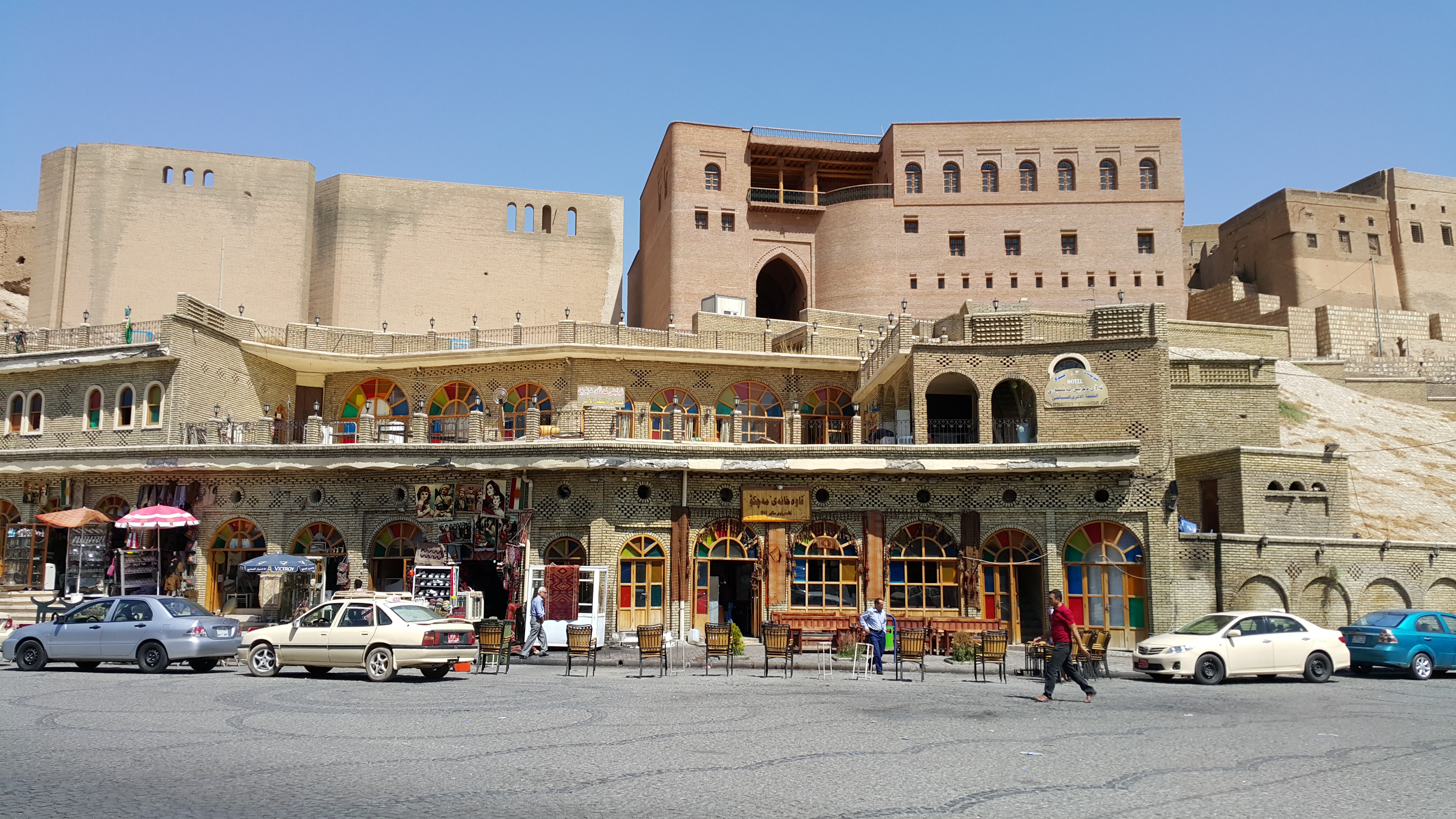
The Citadel of Erbil

The traditional Kurdish village has simple houses, made of mud. In most cases with flat, wooden roofs, and, if the village is built on the slope of a mountain, the roof on one house makes for the garden of the house one level higher. However, houses with a beehive-like roof, not unlike those in Harran, are also present.

Over the centuries many Kurdish architectural marvels have been erected, with varying styles. Kurdistan boasts many examples from ancient Iranian, Roman, Greek and Semitic origin, most famous of these include Bisotun and Taq-e Bostan in Kermanshah, Takht-e Soleyman near Takab, Mount Nemrud near Adiyaman and the citadels of Erbil and Diyarbakir.

The first genuinely Kurdish examples extant were built in the 11th century. Those earliest examples consist of the Marwanid Dicle Bridge in Diyarbakir, the Shadaddid Minuchir Mosque in Ani, and the Hisn al Akrad near Homs.

In the 12th and 13th centuries the Ayyubid dynasty constructed many buildings throughout the Middle East, being influenced by their predecessors, the Fatimids, and their rivals, the Crusaders, whilst also developing their own techniques. Furthermore, women of the Ayyubid family took a prominent role in the patronage of new constructions. The Ayyubids' most famous works are the Halil-ur-Rahman Mosque that surrounds the Pool of Sacred Fish in Urfa, the Citadel of Cairo and most parts of the Citadel of Aleppo. Another important piece of Kurdish architectural heritage from the late 12th/early 13th centuries is the Yezidi pilgrimage site Lalish, with its trademark conical roofs.

In later periods too, Kurdish rulers and their corresponding dynasties and emirates would leave their mark upon the land in the form mosques, castles and bridges, some of which have decayed, or have been (partly) destroyed in an attempt to erase the Kurdish cultural heritage, such as the White Castle of the Bohtan Emirate. Well-known examples are Hosap Castle of the 17th century, Sherwana Castle of the early 18th century, and the Ellwen Bridge of Khanaqin of the 19th century.

Most famous is the Ishak Pasha Palace of Dogubeyazit, a structure with heavy influences from both Anatolian and Iranian architectural traditions. Construction of the Palace began in 1685, led by Colak Abdi Pasha, a Kurdish bey of the Ottoman Empire, but the building would not be completed until 1784, by his grandson, Ishak Pasha. Containing almost 100 rooms, including a mosque, dining rooms, dungeons and being heavily decorated by hewn-out ornaments, this Palace has the reputation as being one of the finest pieces of architecture of the Ottoman Period, and of Anatolia.

In recent years, the KRG has been responsible for the renovation of several historical structures, such as Erbil Citadel and the Mudhafaria Minaret.

== Genetics ==
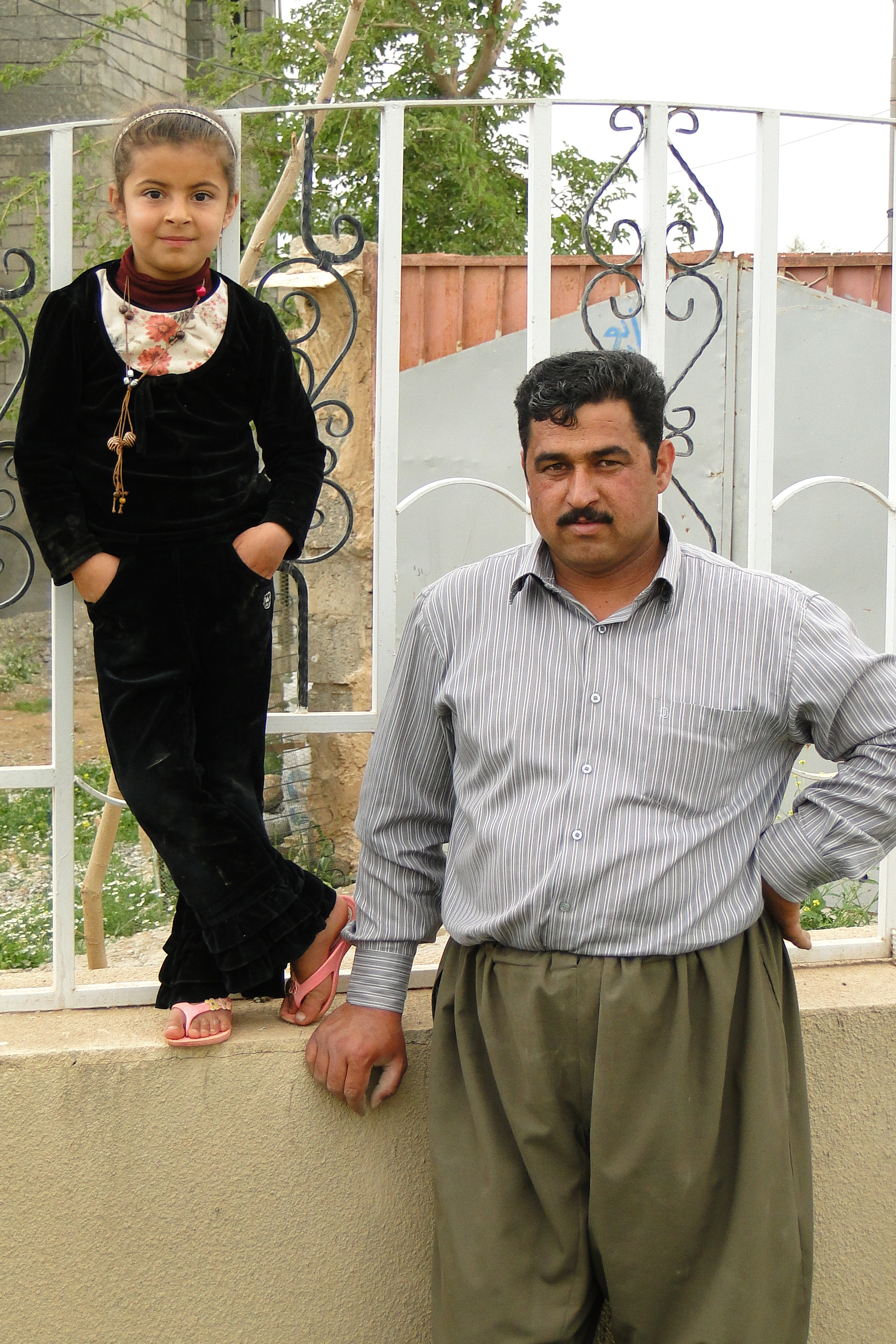
A Kurdish father and daughter in Halabja, Iraq

A 2005 study genetically examined three different groups of Zaza and Kurmanji speakers in Turkey and Kurmanji speakers in Georgia. In the study, mtDNA HV1 sequences, eleven Y chromosome bi-allelic markers and 9 Y-STR loci were analyzed to investigate lineage relationship among Kurdish groups. When both mtDNA and Y chromosome data are compared with those of the European, Caucasian, West Asian and Central Asian groups, it has been determined that the Kurdish groups are most closely related to West Asians and the furthest to Central Asians. Among the European and Caucasian groups, Kurds were found to be closer to Europeans than Caucasians when considering mtDNA, and the opposite was true for Y chromosome. This indicates a difference in maternal and paternal origins of Kurdish groups. According to the study, Kurdish groups in Georgia went through a genetic bottleneck while migrating to the Caucasus. It has also been revealed that these groups were not influenced by other Caucasian groups in terms of ancestry. Another phenomenon found in the research was that Zazas are closer to Kurdish groups rather than peoples of Northern Iran, where ancestral Zaza language hypothesized to be spoken before its spread to Anatolia.

11 different Y-DNA haplogroups have been identified in Kurmanji-speaking Kurds in Turkey. Haplogroup I-M170 was the most prevalent with 16.1% of the samples belonging to it, followed by haplogroups J-M172 (13.8%), R1a1 (12.7%), K (12.7%), E (11.5%) and F (11.5%). P1 (8%), P (5.7%), R1 (4.6%), G (2.3%) and C (1.1%) haplogroups were also present in lower proportions. Y-DNA haplogroup diversity were determined to be much lower among Georgian Kurds, as five haplogroups were discovered in total, where the dominant haplogroups were P1 (44%) and J-M172 (32%). The lowest Y-DNA haplogroup diversity was observed in Turkmenistan Kurds with only 4 haplogroups in total; F (41%) and R1 (29%) were dominant in this population.

== Modern Kurdish-majority entities and governments ==
- Kurdistan Region (1992 to date) – federal region in Iraq
- Democratic Federation of Northern Syria (2013 to date) – autonomy of Syria

== Gallery ==
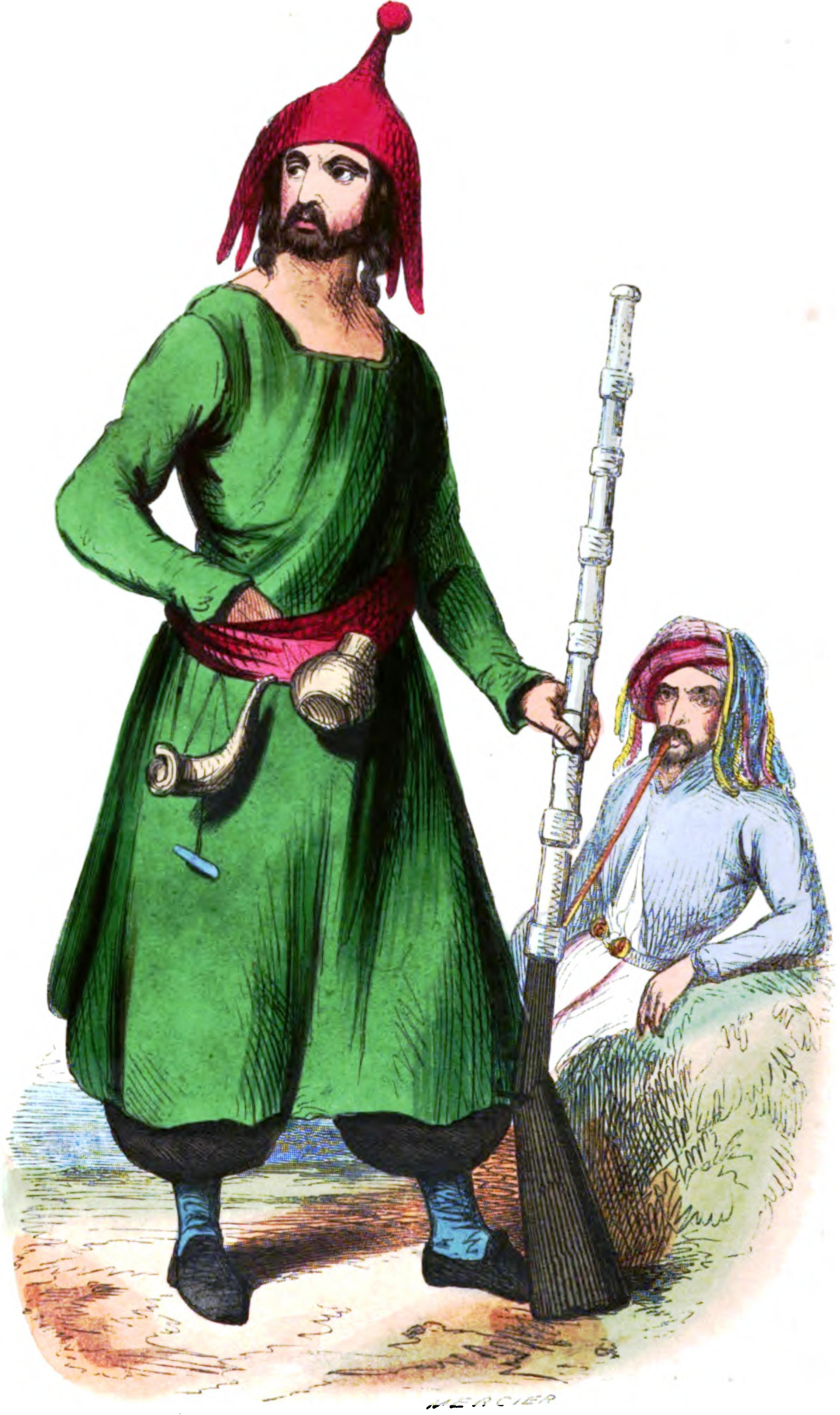
Mercier. Kurde (Asie) by Auguste Wahlen, 1843

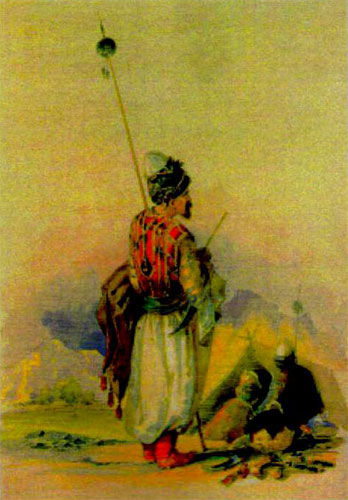
Kurdish warriors by Amadeo Preziosi

Armenian, Turkish and Kurdish females in their traditional clothes, 1873

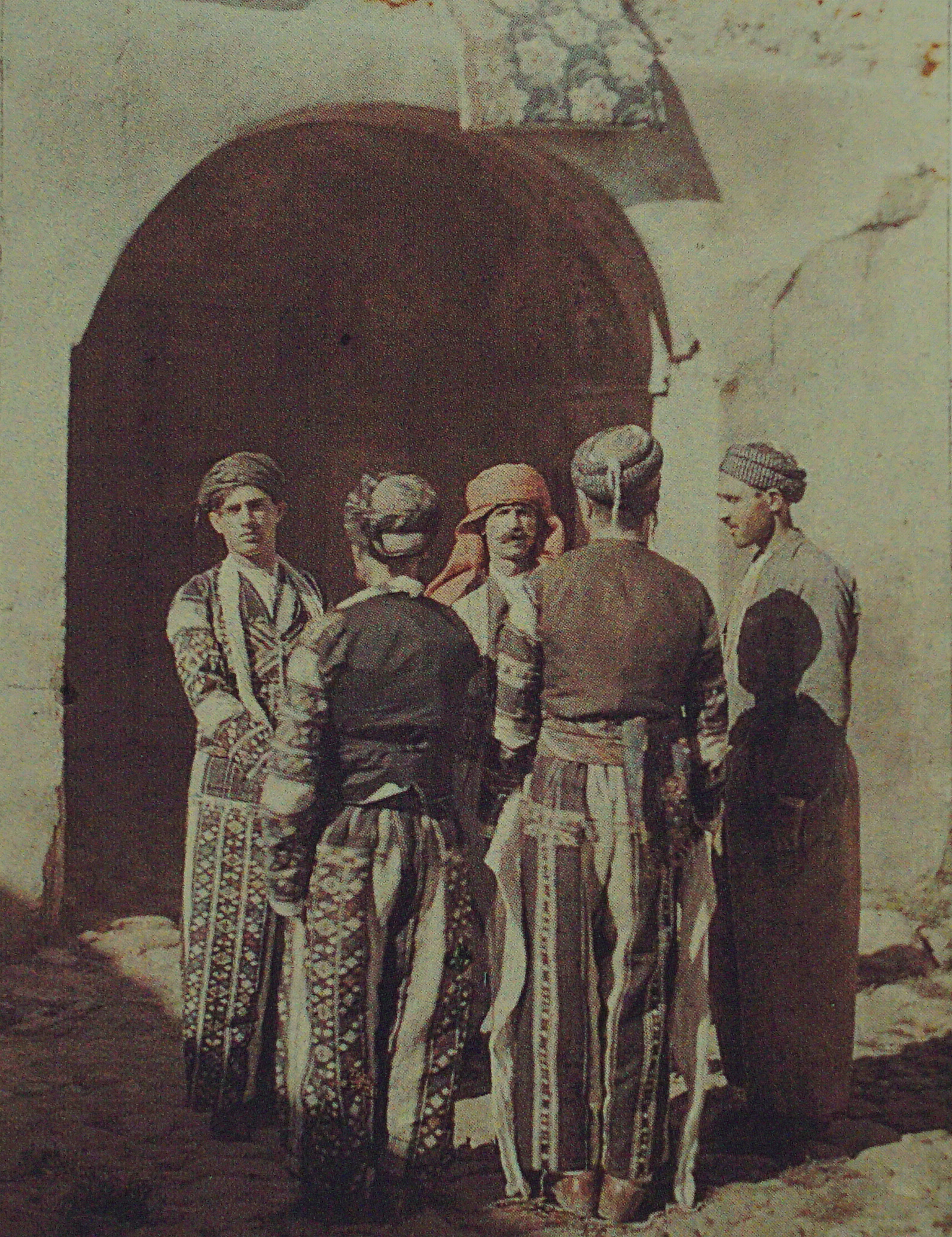
Zakho Kurds by Albert Kahn, 1910s

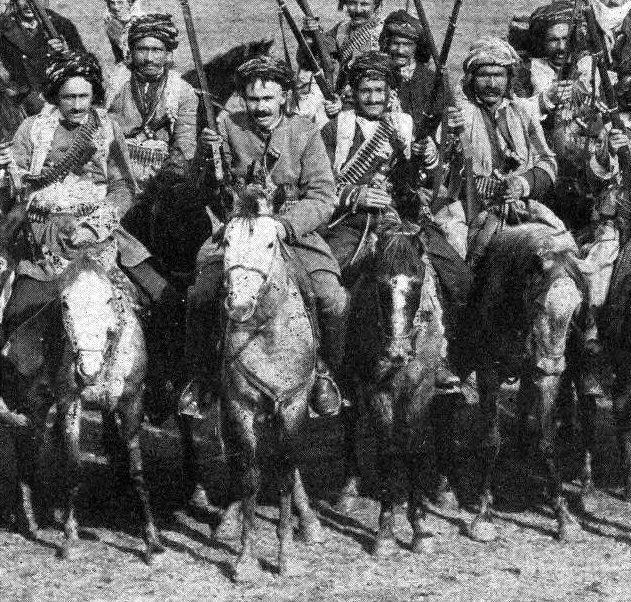
Kurdish cavalry in the passes of the Caucasus mountains (The New York Times, 24 January 1915)

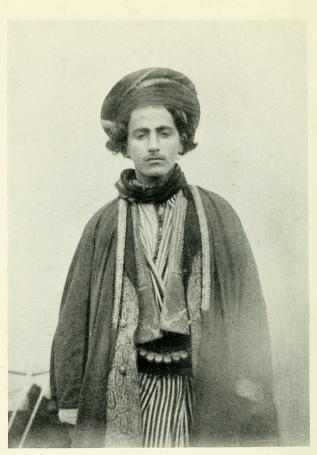
A Kurdish chief

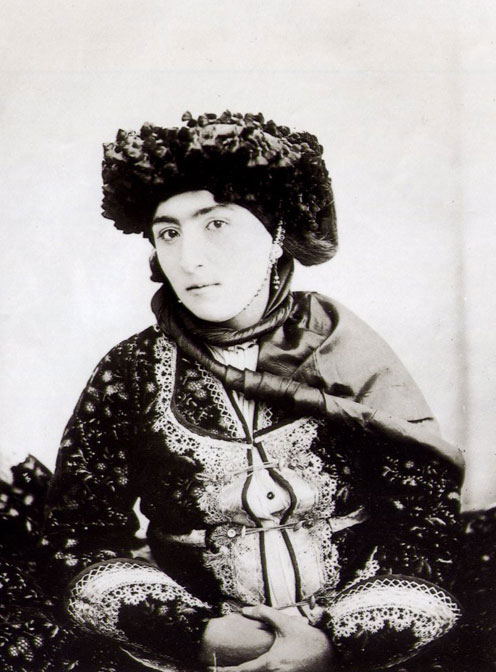
A Kurdish woman from Piranshahr, Iran, Antoin Sevruguin

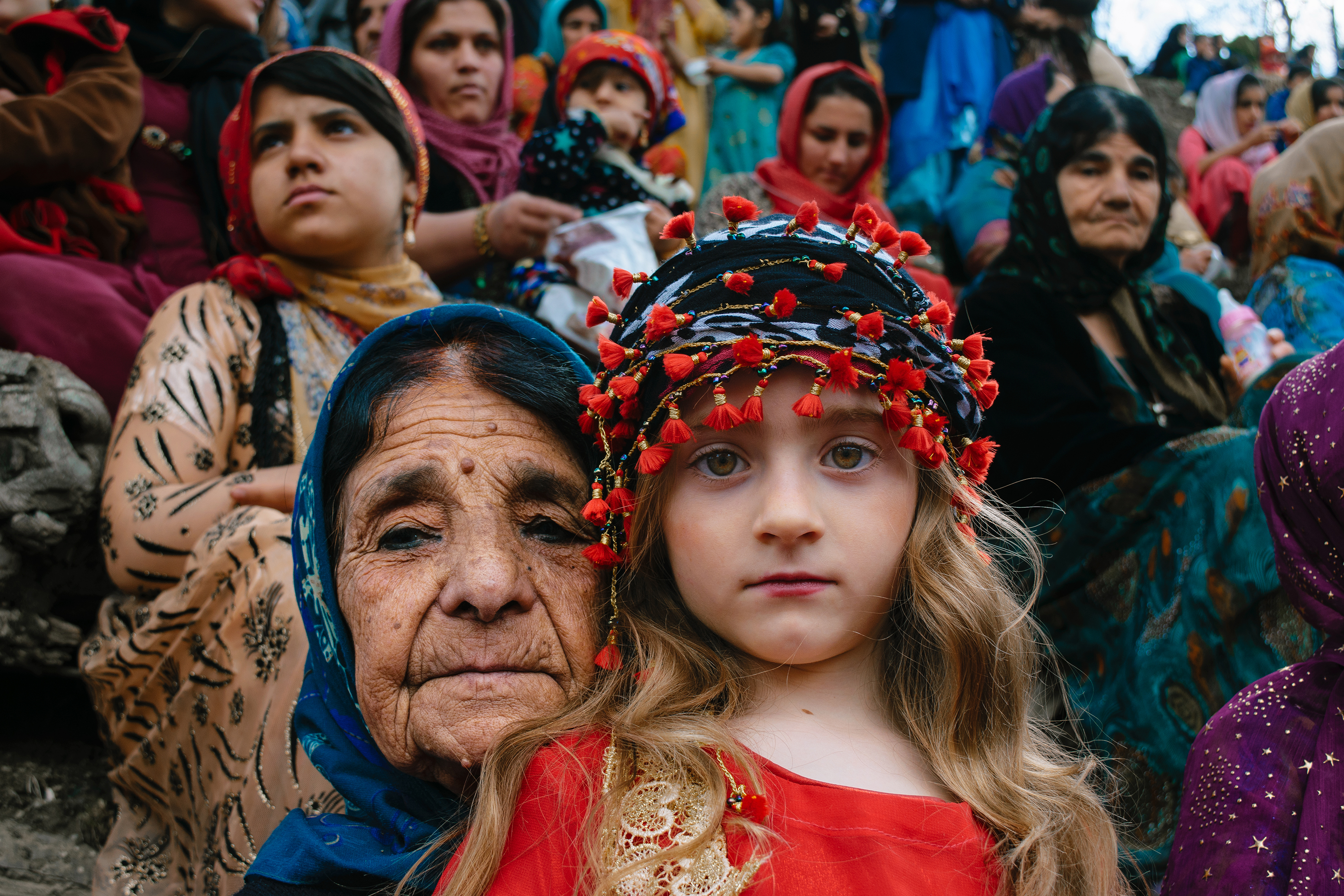
A Kurdish woman and a child from Bisaran, Eastern Kurdistan, 2017

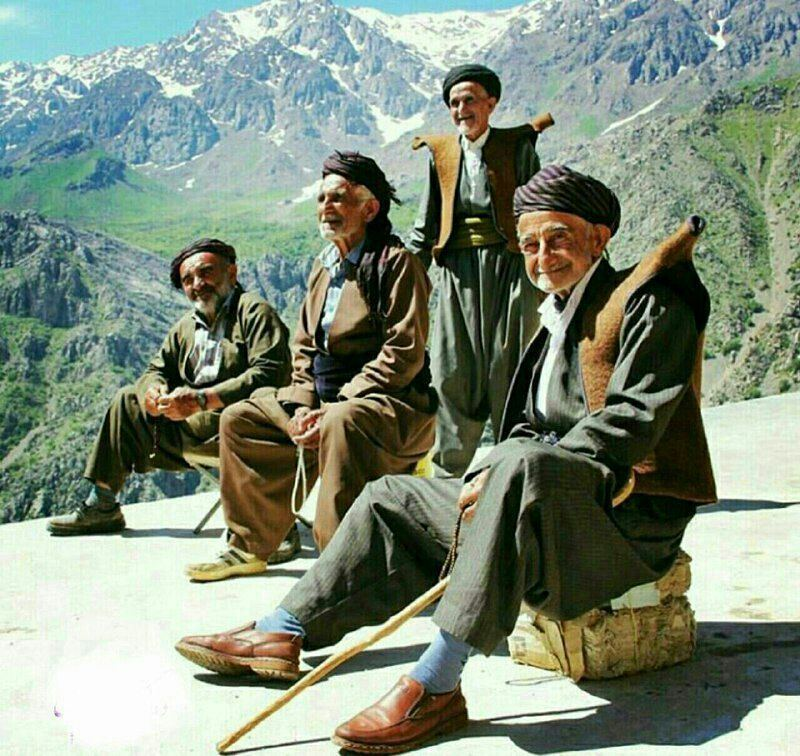
A group of Kurdish men with traditional clothing, Hawraman

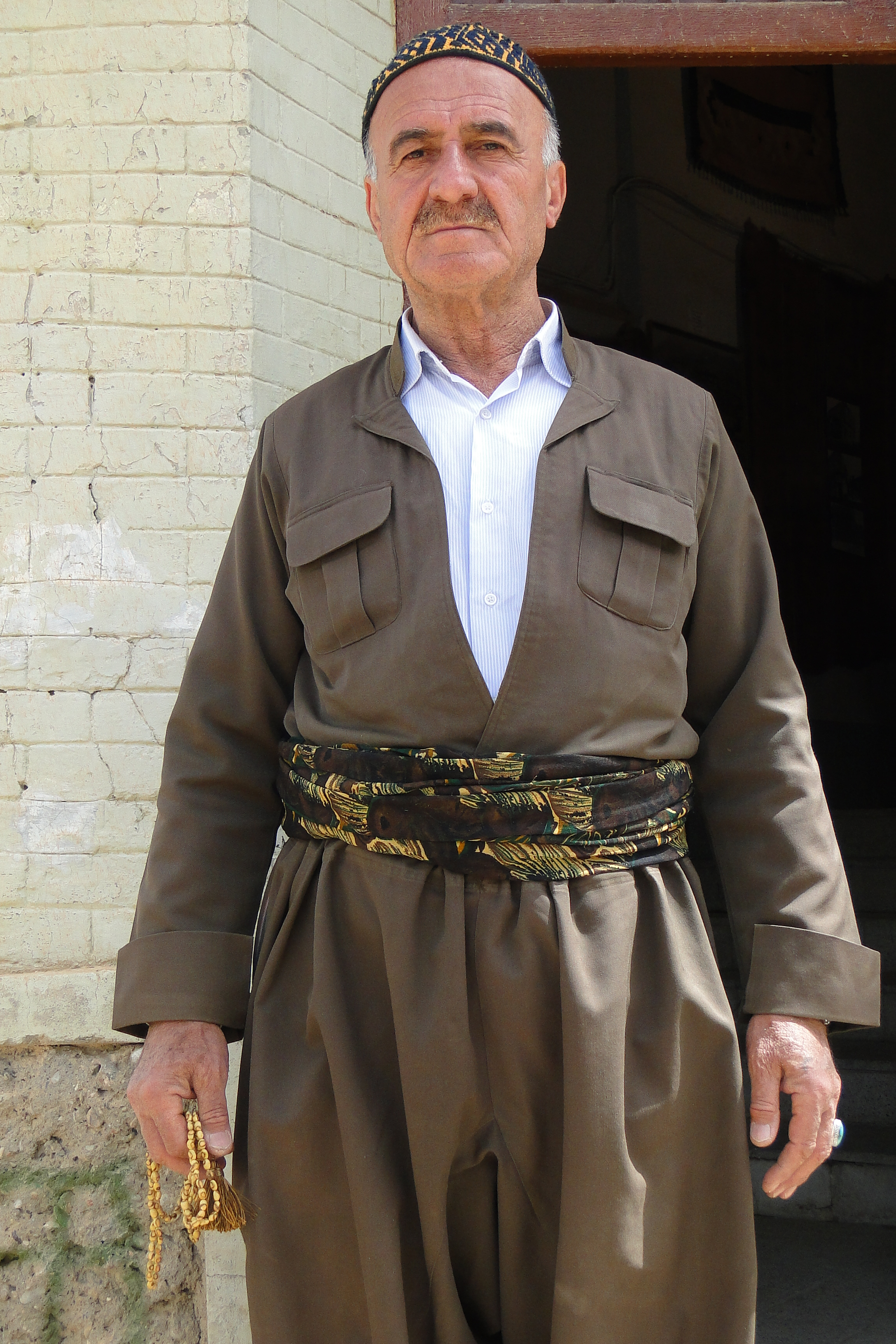
A Kurdish man wearing traditional clothes, Erbil

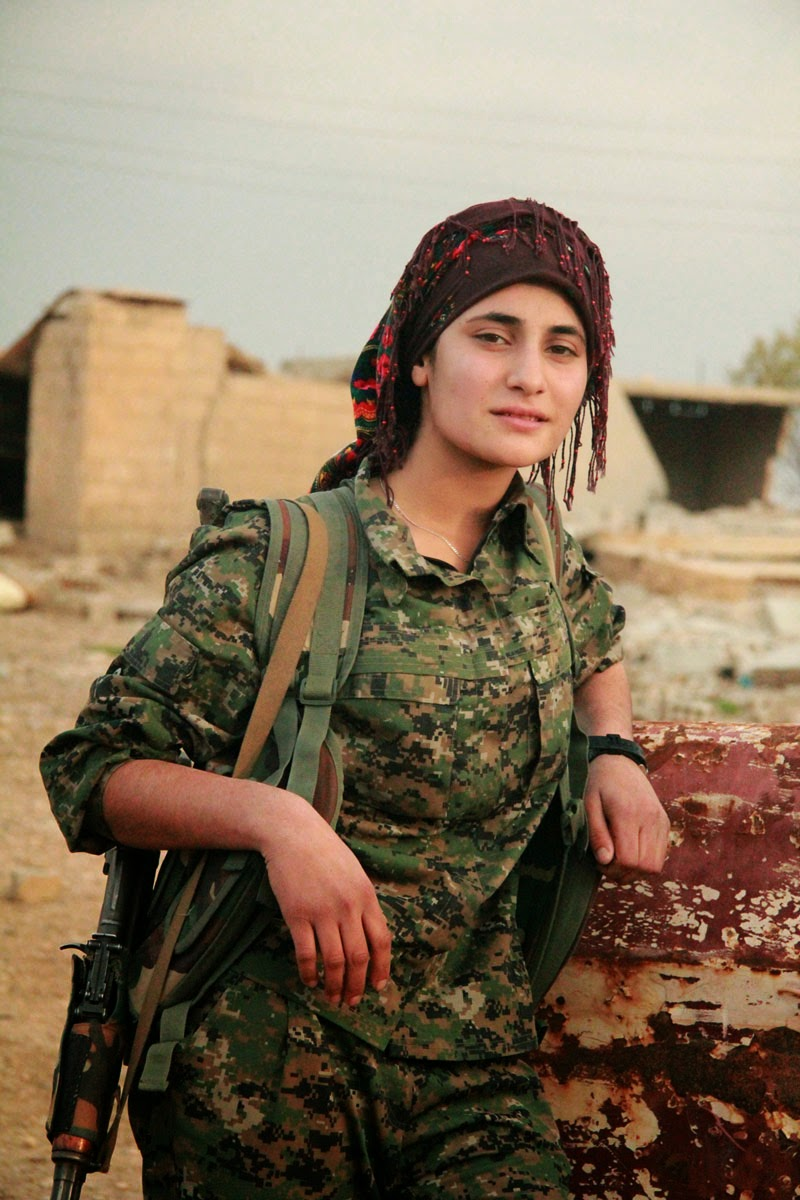
A Kurdish woman fighter from Rojava

== See also ==
- A Modern History of the Kurds by David McDowall
- Kurds in World War II
- History of the Kurdish people
- Kurdology
- Kurds in Georgia
- Kurds in Lebanon
- Kurds in Turkey
- Kurds in Palestine
- Khorasani Kurds
- List of Kurdish dynasties and countries
- List of Kurdish organisations
- List of Kurdish people
- National symbols of the Kurds
- Origins of the Kurds
- Zaza Kurds
