= List of municipalities in Şırnak Province =

This is the List of municipalities in Şırnak Province, Turkey as of March 2023.

District	Municipality
Beytüşşebap	Beytüşşebap
Cizre	Cizre
Güçlükonak	Fındık
Güçlükonak	Güçlükonak
İdil	İdil
İdil	Karalar
İdil	Sırtköy
Silopi	Başverimli
Silopi	Çalışkan
Silopi	Görümlü
Silopi	Silopi
Şırnak	Balveren
Şırnak	Kasrik
Şırnak	Kumçatı
Şırnak	Şırnak
Uludere	Hilal
Uludere	Şenoba
Uludere	Uludere
Uludere	Uzungeçit
