= Origin of the Kurds =

Kurdish ethnogenesis and name origin

Scholars have proposed various theories regarding the origin of the Kurdish people and the name 'Kurd'. Recent scholarship suggests it may derive from the Cyrtii or Corduene, although this remains uncertain, as does the origin of the Kurds themselves. Since most available historical materials come from non-Kurdish sources, scholars must rely on these accounts to trace Kurdish historical roots, which are often difficult to access or understand, causing no end of controversy.

== Name ==
There are various theories about the origin of the name "Kurd." According to one theory, it might be derived from "Cyrtii" (Kurti), a term first used in the 2nd century BCE to describe slingers who lived in the Zagros Mountains. In the 13th century, an Italian monk and preacher who visited Kurdistan also used the term "Curti" to refer to the Kurds.

Alternatively, it might be derived from "Guti" of the Gutian people. According to Safarastian, the "r" was epenthesized after the "u" (Guti > Gurti), following a common linguistic rule in Indo-European languages, particularly those of the East, such as Kurdish, Greek, and Armenian. The Cambridge Ancient History supports this theory stating that the Kurds might have preserved the ancient name of the Gutians.

By the time of the Islamic conquests in the 7th century, and possibly earlier, the term 'Kurd' was used with a socio-economic meaning to describe nomadic groups on the western edge of the Iranian plateau and, possibly, tribes aligned with Sassanian authority in Mesopotamia.

Early Islamic writings mention the Kurds across a wide geographical area. However, due to the ambiguity of these accounts, scholars have debated the meaning of the term "Kurds," considering whether it referred to a group defined by ethnicity and language, nomadic lifestyle, or a specific environment in which they lived. A recent study by Boris James, the first scholar to carefully analyze and interpret these writings, focusing on the 12th to 14th centuries, concluded that 12th-century sources show the Kurds had become a unified ethnic group, although divided into several tribes. According to David McDowall, after the fall of the Sassanids, the identity of the Kurds was generally a source of confusion among early Arab and Persian writers due to limited direct contact with Kurds and Kurdistan. Some believed the term "Kurd" referred to the nomads of the Zagros Mountains, while others viewed the Kurds as an ethnic group, although they were uncertain about the origin of these people. During this period, Kurds were also already present in eastern Anatolia.

According to The Cambridge History of the Kurds:

Many different interpretations have been made in explaining the origin of the word ‘Kurd’ to this day, but the interpreters often have not dwelled on the word ‘Kırd’, the self-designation the Kırmanj (Zazas) use in certain regions. However, Strabo, the ancient Greek author (64 BC–21 AD), uses the term Kύρτιοι (Kurtioi) for Kurds, which is Kyrtii in Latin; the similarity of these Greek and Latin terms with the word ‘Kırd’ and its plural forms ‘Kırdi’/’Kirdi’ is remarkable (Strabon cited in Islâm Ansiklopedisi, 1977: 1090; Lecoq, 2006: 232). Likewise, in the Armenian language, the plural form ‘Krder’, ‘Krdakan’ is used for the Kurds.

== Predecessor groups ==
The Kurds are of heterogeneous origins. Some scholars believe they are descended from Indo-European tribes that migrated to the region around 2000 BCE. Kurdish ethnicity likely developed as a blend of these tribes and the local populations, possibly including the descendants of the Lullubi and the Guti.

The origin of the Kurds remains uncertain, as they are divided among several countries. They are often excluded from official histories and marginalized by state-centered perspectives that dominate academic history. Even within modern European historical scholarship, Kurds are poorly represented, and clear state biases of authors are evident. The available historical records, mostly from non-Kurdish sources, are difficult to access or understand, resulting in various conflicting historical accounts and ongoing controversy. These factors make it challenging to trace their precise origins and early history, particularly before the Arab-Islamic conquests.

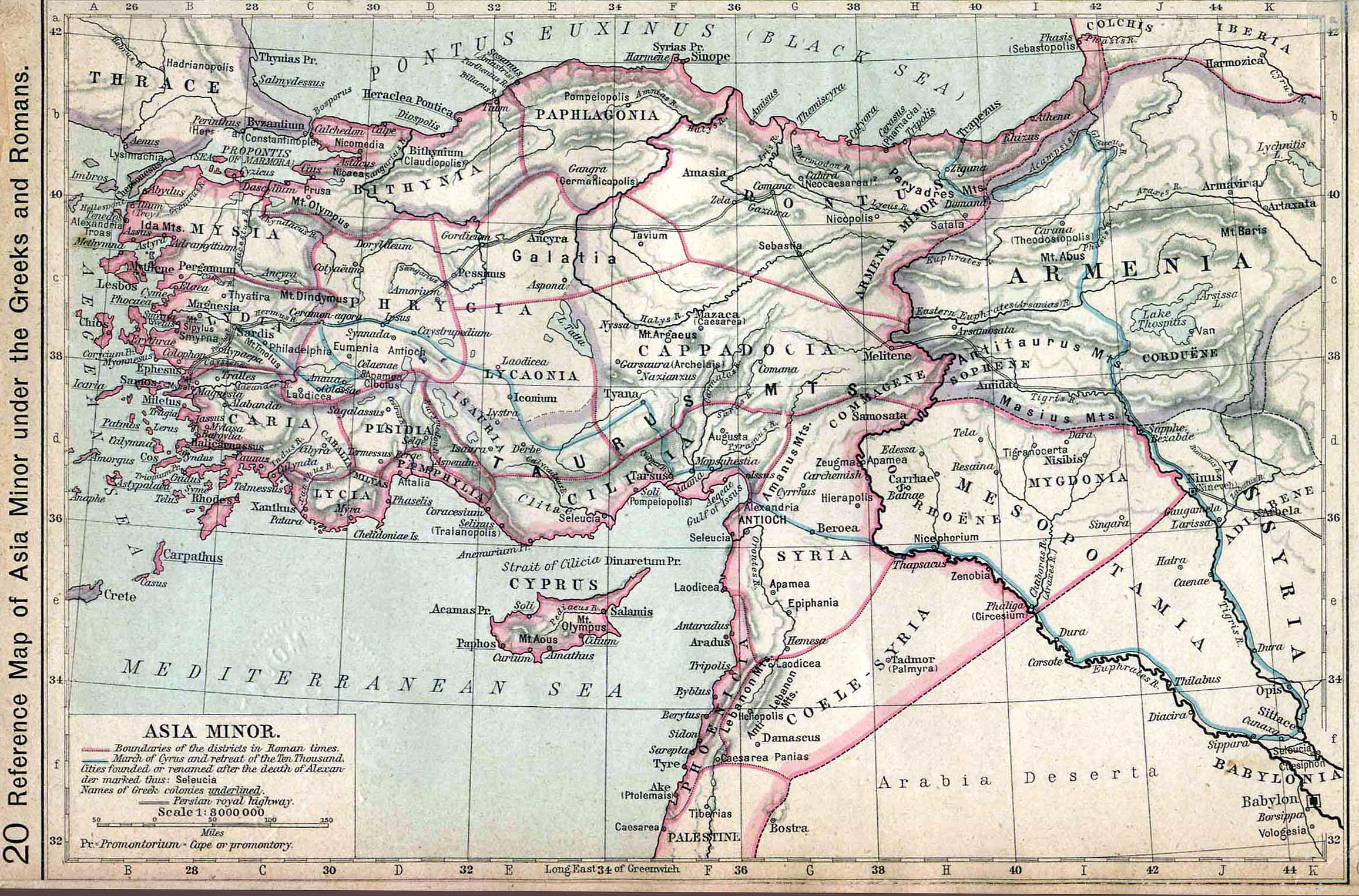
Map showing kingdoms of Corduene and Adiabene during the last centuries BC. The blue line shows the expedition and then retreat of the ten thousand through Corduene in 401 BC.

19th-century scholars, such as George Rawlinson, identified Corduene and Carduchi with the modern Kurds, considering that Carduchi was the ancient lexical equivalent of "Kurdistan". This view is supported by some recent academic sources which have considered Corduene as proto-Kurdish or as equivalent to modern-day Kurdistan. Some modern scholars, however, reject a Kurdish connection to the Carduchi.

There were numerous forms of this name, partly due to the difficulty of representing kh in Latin. The spelling Karduchoi is itself probably borrowed from Armenian, since the termination -choi represents the Armenian language plural suffix -kh. It is speculated that Carduchi spoke an Old Iranian language. They also seem to have had non Iranic Armenian elements.

A legend recorded by Judaic scholars claimed that the people of Corduene had supernatural origins, when King Solomon arranged the marriage of 500 Jewish women to jinns (genies). CJ Edmonds, who visited the Lurs, wrote that the Lurs believed in the same legend as their own origin story. The same legend was also used by early Islamic authorities, in explaining the origins of the Kurds.

The Median hypothesis was advanced by Vladimir Minorsky. Minorsky's view was subsequently accepted by many Kurdish nationalists in the 20th century. I. Gershevitch provided "a piece of linguistic confirmation" of Minorsky's identification and then another "sociolinguistic" argument. Gernot Windfuhr (1975) identified Kurdish dialects as closer to Parthian, albeit with a Median substratum. The hypothesis of having Median ancestors is rejected by Martin van Bruinessen. Bruinessen states: "Though some Kurdish intellectuals claim that their people are descended from the Medes, there is not enough evidence to permit such connection across the considerable gap in time between the political dominance of the Medes, and the first attestation of the Kurds. Garnik Asatrian (2009) stated that "The Central Iranian dialects, and primarily those of the Kashan area in the first place, as well as the Azari dialects (otherwise called Southern Tati) are probably the only Iranian dialects, which can pretend to be the direct offshoots of Median ... In general, the relationship between Kurdish and Median are not closer than the affinities between the latter and other North Western dialects — Baluchi, Talishi, South Caspian, Zaza, Gurani, etc."

== Origin legends ==
There are multiple legends that detail the origins of the Kurds. In the legend of Newroz, an evil king named Zahak, who had two snakes growing out of his shoulders, had conquered Iran, and terrorized its subjects; demanding daily sacrifices in the form of young men's brains. Unknowingly to Zahak, the cooks of the palace saved one of the men, and mixed the brains of the other with those of a sheep. The men that were saved were told to flee to the mountains. Hereafter, Kaveh the Blacksmith, who had already lost several of his children to Zahak, trained the men in the mountains, and stormed Zahak's palace, severing the heads of the snakes and killing the tyrannical king. Kaveh was instilled as the new king, and his followers formed the beginning of the Kurdish people.

In the writings of the 10th-century Arab historian Al-Masudi, the Kurds are described as the offspring of King Solomon’s concubines engendered by the demon Jasad. On learning who they were, Solomon shall have exclaimed "Drive them (ukrudūhunna) in the mountains and valleys" which then suggests a negative connotation such as the "thrown away". Another that they are the descendants of King Solomons's concubines and his angelical servants. These were sent to Europe to bring him five-hundred beautiful maidens, for the king's harem. However, when these had done so and returned to Israel the king had already died. As such, the Djinn settled in the mountains, married the women themselves, and their offspring came to be known as the Kurds.

The Mount Judi (Guti) which is located in North Kurdistan is mentioned in the Quran:

And it was said, “O earth! Swallow up your water. And O sky! Withhold ˹your rain˺.” The floodwater receded and the decree was carried out. The Ark rested on Mount Judi, and it was said, “Away with the wrongdoing people!”

— Surah Hud (44)

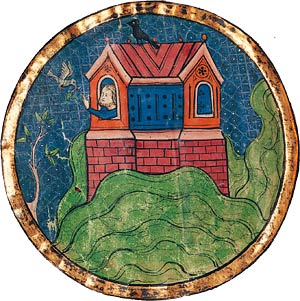
Depiction of Noah's Ark landing on the mountain top, from the North French Hebrew Miscellany (13th century)

The writings of the Ottoman Turkish traveller Evliya Çelebi detail a further legend learned from an Armenian historian labelled only as Mighdisî that ties the story of the Kurds in with their historic proximity to Mount Ararat, which is identified by some religious groups as the resting place of Noah's Ark in the Genesis flood narrative:

According to the chronicler Mighdisî, the first town to be built after Noah's Flood was the town of Judi, followed by the fortresses of Sinjar and Mifariqin. The town of Judi was ruled by Melik Kürdim of the Prophet Noah's community, a man who lived no less than 600 years and who travelled the length and width of Kurdistan. Coming to Mifariqin he liked its climate and settled there, begetting many children and descendants. He invented a language of his own, independent of Hebrew. It is neither Hebrew nor Arabic, Persian, Dari or Pahlavi; they still call it the language of Kürdim. So the Kurdish language, which was invented in Mifariqin and is now used throughout Kurdistan, owes its name to Melik Kürdim of the community of the Prophet Noah. Because Kurdistan is an endless stony stretch of mountains, there are no less than twelve varieties of Kurdish, differing from one another in pronunciation and vocabulary, so that they often have to use interpreters to understand one another's words.

== See also ==
- History of the Kurds
- Medes
- Cyrtians
- Corduene
