= Kavallı, Silopi =

Village in Şırnak Province, Turkey

Kavallı
- Village
- Location within Turkey
- Coordinates: 37.210°N 42.419°E
- Country: Turkey
- Province: Şırnak
- District: Silopi
- Population (2023): 1,670
- Time zone: UTC+3 (TRT)

Kavallı (Kurdish: Nêrwan; Syriac: Nahrawān) (Note: Alternatively transliterated as Nehrivan, Nuhervan, Nahravan, Nahrwān, or Nahrwan.) is a village in the Silopi District of Şırnak Province in Turkey. The village is populated by Kurds of the Tayan tribe and had a population of 1,670 in 2023. It is located in the Khabur valley.

== History ==
Nahrawān (today called Kavallı) was historically inhabited by adherents of the Church of the East and Syriac Orthodox Christians. In 1567, a manuscript was copied at the village by the scribe Hormizd, son of 'Abd Allah, of Karamlesh. Nahrawān is identified with Narman, of which a bishop belonging to the Church of the East named Joseph is attested in 1607. Adherents of the Church of the East in the village converted to the Chaldean Catholic Church in the second half of the 19th century.

In the Syriac Orthodox patriarchal register of dues of 1870, it was recorded that the village had 10 households, who paid 42 households, and did not have a church or a priest. The Chaldean Catholic priest Joseph Tfinkdji noted Nahrawān was populated by 120 Chaldean Catholics in 1913 as part of the Chaldean Catholic diocese of Gazarta who did not have a church or a priest. It was located in the kaza of Jazirat Ibn ʿUmar. In 1914, there were 200 Syriacs, according to the list presented to the Paris Peace Conference by the Assyro-Chaldean delegation. Amidst the Sayfo, the village was attacked by the Bohtan Kurds.

== Population ==
Population history from 2007 to 2023:

Population
Year	Pop.	±%
2007	985	—
2010	1,115	+13.2%
2015	1,435	+28.7%
2020	1,661	+15.7%
2023	1,670	+0.5%

== Bibliography ==
- Baz, Ibrahim (2016). Şırnak aşiretleri ve kültürü (in Turkish). ISBN 9786058849631.
- Bcheiry, Iskandar (2009). The Syriac Orthodox Patriarchal Register of Dues of 1870: An Unpublished Historical Document from the Late Ottoman Period. Gorgias Press.
- Gaunt, David (2006). Massacres, Resistance, Protectors: Muslim-Christian Relations in Eastern Anatolia during World War I. Gorgias Press.
- Jongerden, Joost; Verheij, Jelle, eds. (2012). Social Relations in Ottoman Diyarbekir, 1870-1915. Brill.
- Wilmshurst, David (2000). The Ecclesiastical Organisation of the Church of the East, 1318–1913 (PDF). Peeters Publishers.
