= Buğdaylı, Silopi =

Village in Şırnak Province, Turkey

Buğdaylı
- Village
- Location within Turkey
- Coordinates: 37.166°N 42.408°E
- Country: Turkey
- Province: Şırnak
- District: Silopi
- Population (2023): 1,703
- Time zone: UTC+3 (TRT)

Buğdaylı (Kurdish: Taqyan; Syriac: Ṭāqiān) (Note: Alternatively transliterated as Taqiyan, Tahyan, Takyan, Takian, or Takiann.) is a village in the Silopi District of Şırnak Province in Turkey. The village is populated by Kurds of the Tayan tribe and had a population of 1,703 in 2023.

== History ==
Ṭāqiān (today called Buğdaylı) was historically inhabited by Chaldean Catholics. Gīwārgīs of Ṭāqiān is attested as having entered the Rabban Hormizd Monastery in 1809 and a monk called Gīwārgīs of Ṭāqiān, son of Kalyānā, son of Israel, is recorded to have copied two manuscripts at the Rabban Hormizd Monastery in 1882 and another there in 1888. The village had two churches, dedicated to Mart Shmuni and Mar Quriaqos.

In 1850, it was populated by 15 Chaldean Catholic families who were served by one functioning church and one priest as part of the Chaldean Catholic diocese of Gazarta, according to the English missionary George Percy Badger. The Chaldean Catholic priest Joseph Tfinkdji noted Ṭāqiān was inhabited by 900 Chaldean Catholics with three priests and one church in 1913. It was populated 600 by Syriacs in 1914, as per the list presented to the Paris Peace Conference by the Assyro-Chaldean delegation.

Amidst the Sayfo, on 10 July 1915, Ṭāqiān was attacked by the aghas of Şırnak and Silopi and Suleiman Ismael and though the villagers had attempted to defend themselves at the church, they were locked inside as it was set alight, resulting in the death of the mayor, the priest, and 105 others, and the village was destroyed.

== Population ==
Population history from 2007 to 2023:

Population
Year	Pop.	±%
2007	1,913	—
2010	1,317	−31.2%
2015	1,476	+12.1%
2020	1,625	+10.1%
2023	1,703	+4.8%

== Bibliography ==
- Baz, Ibrahim (2016). Şırnak aşiretleri ve kültürü (in Turkish). ISBN 9786058849631.
- Gaunt, David (2006). Massacres, Resistance, Protectors: Muslim-Christian Relations in Eastern Anatolia during World War I. Gorgias Press.
- Jongerden, Joost; Verheij, Jelle, eds. (2012). Social Relations in Ottoman Diyarbekir, 1870-1915. Brill.
- Wilmshurst, David (2000). The Ecclesiastical Organisation of the Church of the East, 1318–1913 (PDF). Peeters Publishers.
- Yacoub, Joseph (2016). Year of the Sword: The Assyrian Christian Genocide, A History. Translated by James Ferguson. Oxford University Press.
