= Biseng Brusk =

PKK leader (1988–2023)

Biseng Brusk was the nom de guerre of Rojda Bilen (1988–2023), a prominent female leader in the Kurdistan Workers' Party (PKK).

Bilen was born 1988 in Lausanne, Switzerland, to Kurdish parents from Şırnak in Turkey. While still a child, she left Switzerland for Turkey with part of her family and joined the PKK aged 23.

She rapidly joined the organization's leadership, for a time heading the PKK's youth wing. She was responsible for recruiting female fighters from Europe and Latin America, particularly for combat in Rojava in northern Syria, where she was often active. One of her brothers died fighting for the PKK.

In 2011, Bilen was listed as a terrorist by Turkey, and in 2023, in a pickup in Northern Iraq, she was killed by a drone in a videotaped and publicised targeted killing operation of the Turkish National Intelligence Organization. As a martyr, she became a legend among PKK sympathizers in Switzerland, which has a large Kurdish diaspora. Her image and story continue to be used to recruit fighters, particularly in left-wing feminist circles.
