= Toptepe =

Toptepe may refer to the following settlements in Turkey:

- Toptepe, Adıyaman, a village in Adıyaman Province
- Toptepe, Beytüşşebap, a village in Şırnak Province
- Toptepe, Midyat, a neighbourhood in Mardin Province
- Toptepe, Şırnak, a village in Şırnak Province
