= Aksu, Silopi =

Village in Şırnak Province, Turkey

Aksu
- Village
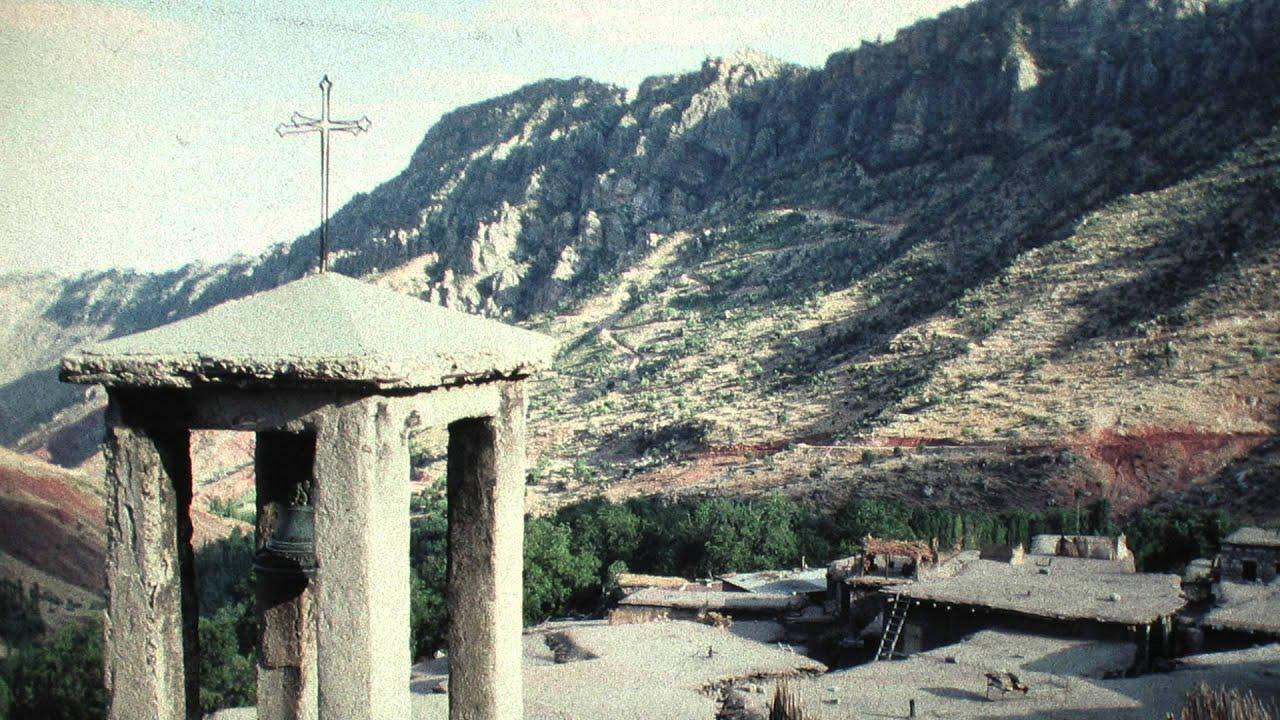
- A view of the village with the bell of a Chaldean Catholic church

- Location within Turkey
- Coordinates: 37.336°N 42.637°E
- Country: Turkey
- Province: Şırnak
- District: Silopi
- Population (2025): 13
- Time zone: UTC+3 (TRT)

Aksu (Kurdish: Herbûl; Syriac: ܗܪܒܘܠܐ, romanized: Harbōl) (Note: Alternatively transliterated as Harbul, Harbol, Herbol, Herbül, or Herbul.) is a village in the Silopi District of Şırnak Province in Turkey. The village is populated by Assyrians belonging to the Chaldean Catholic Church and had a population of 13 in 2025, a decrease from 1,066 in 1985.

== History ==
The village of Harbōl (today called Aksu) is situated between two mountains with coal mines, and is located eight kilometres from the Iraq–Turkey border. In 1900, the village was part of the Mardin sancak, Cizre kaza in the Diyarbekir vilayet of the Ottoman Empire. In 1913, Harbōl was inhabited by 300 Chaldean Catholics and was served by one priest and one church as part of the Chaldean Catholic Eparchy of Gazarta, according to the Chaldean Catholic priest Joseph Tfinkdji. As per the list presented to the Paris Peace Conference by the Assyro-Chaldean delegation, the village was populated by 500 Syriacs in 1914. There was a ruined monastery of Mār Addaï located to the southeast of the village.

Amidst the Sayfo, the villagers were protected by Rachid Osman, the agha of Şırnak, who moved them to mountain villages whilst Harbōl itself was destroyed. By 1918, the village was exclusively inhabited by 300 Assyrians. In the 1950s, the village had churches of Mart Maryam and Mar Joseph which may have been built prior to the First World War. By the 1980s, the village's population was believed to be around 4,000 Chaldo-Assyrians.

As a result of the Kurdish–Turkish conflict, Harbōl was targeted several times during the Turkish army’s pursuit of Kurdish militants into Iraq. According to Joseph Yacoub, 1,500 of the village's inhabitants left for Europe, 437 of whom arrived in France. In the 1990s, village guards, predominantly Kurds, were imposed in the region. The village was thus forcibly evacuated in 1991 and the locals immigrated to mainly France; only the local church, school and some houses remained intact.

In 2009, Petrus Karatay initiated efforts to return to Harbōl and submitted a request through the Embassy of Turkey, Paris; after negotiations in France and Belgium, it was agreed that 27 families would return. At the time, the village shifted 200m downward due to rubble and soil. Karatay returned in 2013 during the first stage of the 2013–2015 PKK–Turkey peace process, finding that the village was confiscated by coal mines and under the control of village guards. Harbōl was hit by fire in 2015 which obstructed its reconstruction, with Karatay claiming the fire was started by soldiers. In 2018, the Assyrian International News Agency reported that Karatay was detained for unknown reasons.

== Population ==
The following table presents the population history of Harbōl from 1985 to 2025:

Population
Year	Pop.	±%
1985	1,066	—
2020	16	−98.5%
2023	10	−37.5%
2025	13	+30.0%

== Bibliography ==
- BarAbraham, Abdulmesih (2021). "Returning Home: The Ambivalent Assyrian Experience in Turkey". Poligrafi. 26 (101/102): 153–176. doi:10.35469/poligrafi.2021.282.
- Baz, Ibrahim (2016). Şırnak aşiretleri ve kültürü (in Turkish). ISBN 9786058849631.
- Gaunt, David (2006). Massacres, Resistance, Protectors: Muslim-Christian Relations in Eastern Anatolia during World War I. Gorgias Press.
- Jongerden, Joost; Verheij, Jelle, eds. (2012). Social Relations in Ottoman Diyarbekir, 1870-1915. Brill.
- Wilmshurst, David (2000). The Ecclesiastical Organisation of the Church of the East, 1318–1913 (PDF). Peeters Publishers.
- Yacoub, Joseph (2016). Year of the Sword: The Assyrian Christian Genocide, A History. Translated by James Ferguson. Oxford University Press.
