= Başağaç =

Başağaç may refer to:

- Başağaç, Kızılcahamam, a village in Ankara Province, Turkey
- Başağaç, Sandıklı, a village in Afyonkarahisar Province, Turkey
- Başağaç, Savur, a village in Mardin Province, Turkey
- Başağaç, Şırnak, a village in Şırnak Province, Turkey
