= Çiftlikköy, Silopi =

Village in Şırnak Province, Turkey

Çiftlikköy
- Village
- Location within Turkey
- Coordinates: 37.174°N 42.419°E
- Country: Turkey
- Province: Şırnak
- District: Silopi
- Population (2023): 3,083
- Time zone: UTC+3 (TRT)

Çiftlikköy (Kurdish: Bedrû; Syriac: Guerektha d’Badro) (Note: Alternatively transliterated as Garkī Badrū, Girikbedro, Girik Bedro, Girik Bedrō, Gurcnébédro, Guircnébédro, or Guirguébadro.) is a village in the Silopi District of Şırnak Province in Turkey. The village is populated by Kurds of the Tayan tribe and had a population of 3,083 in 2023.

The hamlet of Ilıcalar (Hevingo) is attached to Çiftlikköy.

== History ==
Guerektha d’Badro (today called Çiftlikköy) was historically inhabited by Chaldean Catholics and Syriac Orthodox Christians. The scribe Isha'ya, son of Peter, of the Mir Sharif family of Arena, copied a manuscript at the village in 1844. In 1850, Guerektha d’Badro was populated by 12 Chaldean Catholic families and had one church as part of the Chaldean Catholic diocese of Gazarta, according to the English missionary George Percy Badger. The priest Zakarya, son of the priest Yalda, of the Monastery of Mar Sabrisho, is recorded to have copied a manuscript at the village in 1859 as well.

In the Syriac Orthodox patriarchal register of dues of 1870, it was recorded that the village had 10 households, who paid 38 dues, and it had one priest, but it did not have a church. There were 600 Chaldean Catholics with one church and one priest in 1913, as per the Chaldean Catholic priest Joseph Tfinkdji. In 1914, it was inhabited by 800 Syriacs, according to the list presented to the Paris Peace Conference by the Assyro-Chaldean delegation. It was located in the kaza of Jazirat Ibn ʿUmar. Amidst the Sayfo, Guerektha d’Badro was attacked on the feast day of Saint Thomas the Apostle, on 3 July 1915, and most of the villagers were massacred inside the church and the village itself was destroyed.

== Population ==
Population history from 2007 to 2023:

Population
Year	Pop.	±%
2007	2,127	—
2010	2,422	+13.9%
2015	2,881	+19.0%
2020	3,085	+7.1%
2023	3,083	−0.1%

== Bibliography ==
- Baz, Ibrahim (2016). Şırnak aşiretleri ve kültürü (in Turkish). ISBN 9786058849631.
- Bcheiry, Iskandar (2009). The Syriac Orthodox Patriarchal Register of Dues of 1870: An Unpublished Historical Document from the Late Ottoman Period. Gorgias Press.
- Gaunt, David (2006). Massacres, Resistance, Protectors: Muslim-Christian Relations in Eastern Anatolia during World War I. Gorgias Press.
- Jongerden, Joost; Verheij, Jelle, eds. (2012). Social Relations in Ottoman Diyarbekir, 1870-1915. Brill.
- Wilmshurst, David (2000). The Ecclesiastical Organisation of the Church of the East, 1318–1913 (PDF). Peeters Publishers.
- Yacoub, Joseph (2016). Year of the Sword: The Assyrian Christian Genocide, A History. Translated by James Ferguson. Oxford University Press.
