= Selçik, Silopi =

Village in Şırnak Province, Turkey

Selçik
- Village
- Location within Turkey
- Coordinates: 37.301°N 42.584°E
- Country: Turkey
- Province: Şırnak
- District: Silopi
- Population (2023): 14
- Time zone: UTC+3 (TRT)

Selçik (Kurdish: Derêdefş) is a village in the Silopi District of Şırnak Province in Turkey. The village is populated by Kurds and had a population of 14 in 2023.

It was burned by authorities in the early 1990s, during the Kurdish–Turkish conflict.

== Population ==
Population history from 2007 to 2023:

Population
Year	Pop.	±%
2015	10	—
2020	10	+0.0%
2023	14	+40.0%
