= Körüklükaya, Şırnak =

Village in Şırnak Province, Turkey

Körüklükaya
- Village
- Location within Turkey
- Coordinates: 37.593°N 42.231°E
- Country: Turkey
- Province: Şırnak
- District: Şırnak
- Population (2021): 28
- Time zone: UTC+3 (TRT)

Körüklükaya (Kurdish: Nehke) is a village in the central district of Şırnak Province in Turkey. The village had a population of 28 in 2021.
