= Birlikköy, Silopi =

Village in Şırnak Province, Turkey

Birlikköy
- Village
- Location within Turkey
- Coordinates: 37.246°N 42.519°E
- Country: Turkey
- Province: Şırnak
- District: Silopi
- Population (2023): 573
- Time zone: UTC+3 (TRT)

Birlikköy (Kurdish: Cumayî) is a village in the Silopi District of Şırnak Province in Turkey. The village is populated by Kurds of the Botikan tribe and had a population of 573 in 2023.

The hamlets of Eğrıkonak and Ovabaşı are attached to Birlikköy.

== Population ==
Population history from 2007 to 2023:

Population
Year	Pop.	±%
2007	113	—
2010	120	+6.2%
2015	155	+29.2%
2020	384	+147.7%
2023	573	+49.2%
