= Gordyene =

Ancient region, today in Turkey

Coordinates: 37.5500°N 43.3833°E

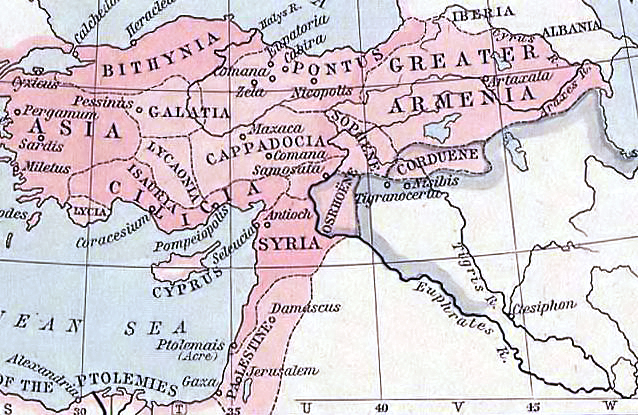
60 BC Kingdom of Corduene

Gordyene or Corduene (Note: Alternative forms: Gorduene, Cordyene, Cardyene, Carduene, Gordyaea, Korduene, and Gordian.) (Ancient Greek: Γορδυηνή, romanized: Gordyēnḗ or Κορδυηνή, Kordyēnḗ; Armenian: Կորդուք, romanized: Korduk'; Hebrew: קרטיגיני, romanized: Kartigini; Classical Syriac: Beth Qardu) was an ancient historical region, located on the upper course of the Tigris, south of Lake Van, in present-day southeastern Turkey.

Gordyene was situated between the countries of Armenia, Adiabene, and Atropatene. Since antiquity, the people of Gordyene have been identified with the Karduchoi, a people who inhabited the mountainous area south of the Botan River c. 401 BC. Gordyene became an independent kingdom sometime between 165–164 BC and 95 BC, after the collapse of Seleucid power and before the conquest of Mesopotamia by the Parthians. It was vassalized by the Armenian king Tigranes the Great in the 1st century BC, who overthrew and killed its king. Its subsequent political history is the subject of differing interpretations by scholars. It either regained its independence (as a vassal state of the Parthians) or formed part of the kingdom of Adiabene until its conquest by the Romans under Trajan (r. 98–117). Under Trajan's successor Hadrian (r. 117–138), it either reverted to Adiabene or was granted to Armenia. With the Peace of Nisibis in 298, the Romans gained suzerainty over Gordyene and other territories located, from the Roman perspective, on the far side of the Tigris. The nature of the political relationship between the princes of Gordyene and the kings of Armenia in the 4th century is a matter of scholarly dispute. In 363, the Romans officially ceded Gordyene (which they had apparently already lost by 359) to the Sasanian Empire.

Ancient sources attest to Gordyene's fertility and its wealth of natural resources, such as wheat, wine, pastures, naphtha, and cardamom. Its urban settlements were of strategic significance as they were situated near important mountain passes and river crossings. The archaeological site of Eski Finik (and nearby Eski Hendek) has been identified with Pinaca, one of the cities of Gordyene mentioned by the Greek geographer Strabo. Other archaeological sites in the area have also been connected with Gordyene.

== History ==
=== Karduchoi ===
Gordyene originated as the territory of Karduchoi (or Carduchii), a tribe first mentioned in the Anabasis of Xenophon, an eyewitness account of the retreat of the Greek mercenary army of the Ten Thousand to the Black Sea in 401 BC. (Note: Robert H. Hewsen, however, writes, "it is not at all certain that the Gordyaians were the same people as the Kardoukhoi".) Gordyene is explicitly identified with the Karduchoi in the works of Strabo (died 24 AD) and Pliny the Elder (23/24–79 AD). According to Xenophon's account, the Karduchoi inhabited the mountainous region south of the Kentrites River (today's Botan) and north of the modern-day city of Cizre. Xenophon indicates that the Karduchoi were economically sufficient; they had their own crafts and lived off of agriculture in the mountain valleys. They were a warlike mountain people who specialized in archery and guerrilla warfare. After 401 BC, they expanded beyond their original territory south of the Botan River into the Upper Tigris valley located between the Batman and Khabur rivers. In particular, the rich Silopi plain came under their control. (Note: See below for Hewsen's alternative reconstruction of Gordyene's geographical evolution.)

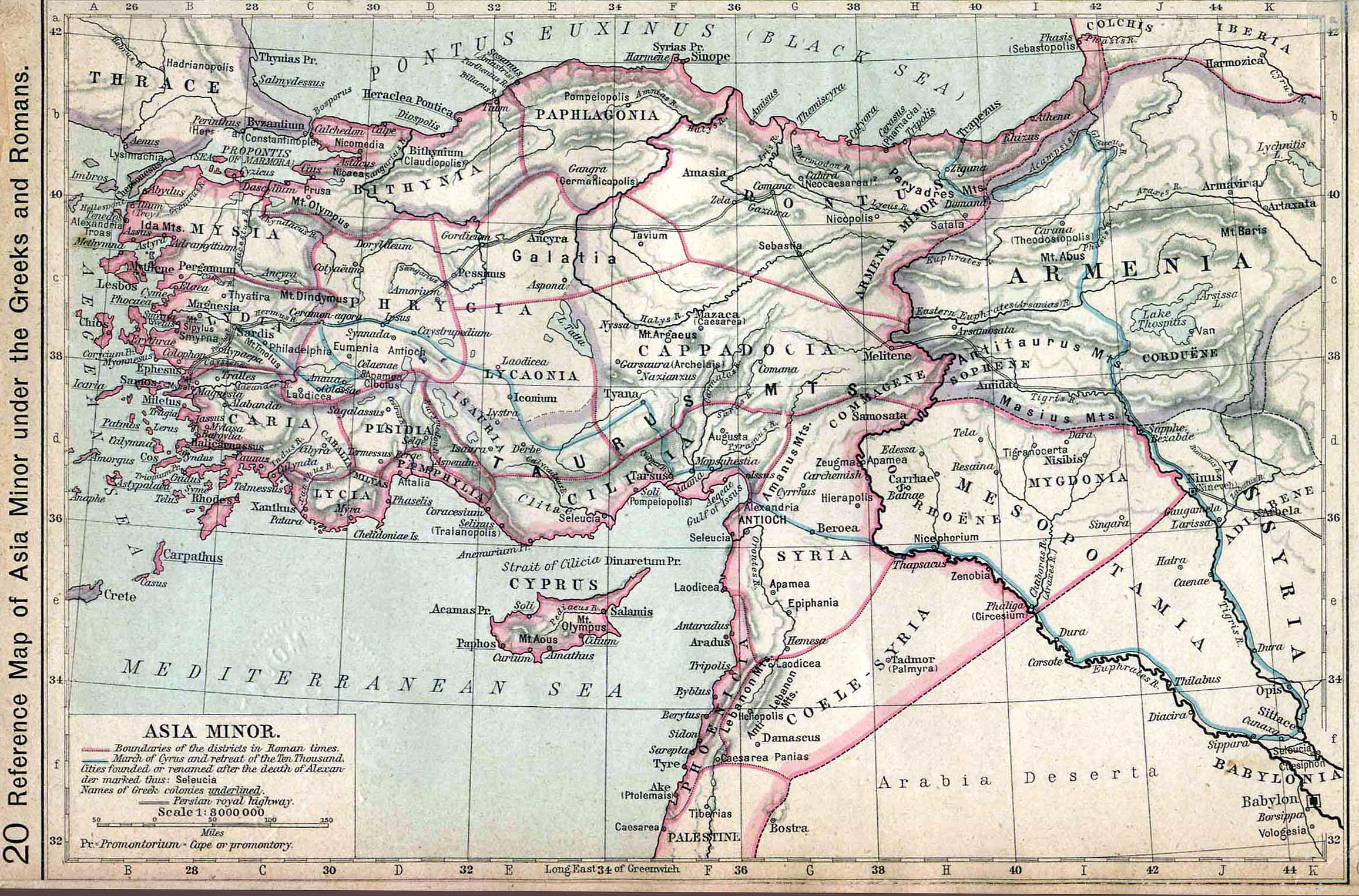
Map showing kingdoms of Corduene and Adiabene in the last centuries BC. The blue line shows the expedition and then retreat of the ten thousand through Corduene in 401 BC.

The origin of the Karduchoi is uncertain. According to Michał Marciak, it can only be inferred from the information given by Classical authors such as Xenophon and Plutarch (died after 119 AD) that the Karduchoi were of non-Armenian origin. The Iranologist and Kurdologist Garnik Asatrian considers the Karduchoi to have been an indigenous people inhabiting the area before the arrival of the Iranians. Others have speculated that the Carduchi spoke an Old Iranian language. The name Karduchoi has been connected with the Akkadian word qardu ("strong," "heroic").

=== Political history up to 363 AD ===
Map showing Corduene as a vassal Kingdom of Armenian Empire.

In the period between the collapse of Seleucid power and conquest of Mesopotamia by the Parthians (i.e. sometime between 165–164 BC and 95 BC), the Karduchoi established an independent kingdom. Gordyene came under Parthian rule either in about 145–141 BCE, together with neighboring Adiabene, or later, during the reign of the Parthian king Mithradates II (122–87 BC); Marciak considers the latter option more probably.

Gordyene was vassalized by the Armenian king Tigranes the Great (r. 95–55 BC), who expanded it by taking territory from Parthian Adiabene. According to Plutarch's Life of Lucullus, the Gordyeni were one of the peoples whose cities Tigranes destroyed so that their inhabitants could populate his new capital of Tigranocerta. The only king of Gordyene who is explicitly identified in ancient sources, Zarbienus, was dethroned and killed by Tigranes in the winter of 71/70 BC. Plutarch reports that Zarbienus sought an alliance with the Romans during Lucullus' campaign against Tigranes. Tigranes discovered his intentions and had him killed along with his wife and children before the Roman forces reached Armenia. When his army arrived in Gordyene, Lucullus honored Zarbienus with rich funeral rites and called him called him his companion and a confederate of the Romans. Lucullus' forces withdrew in the spring of 67 BC, after which Gordyene became the subject of a territorial dispute between Tigranes and the Parthian king Phraates III (r. 69–57 BC). The Parthians took Gordyene by force in 67 or 66 BC, but the territory was soon returned to Armenia through the intervention of Pompey. (Note: Appian (2nd century AD) writes that Pompey gave Sophene and Gordyene to Ariobarzanes I of Cappadocia after having originally granted it to Tigranes' son (also named Tigranes). Several scholars have doubted that Gordyene could have been assigned to Cappadocia, as this contradicts the testimonies of Plutarch (Life of Pompey 36.2).and Dio Cassius (38.5.4) on the region becoming the subject of a territorial dispute between Armenia and the Parthian Empire and ultimately being given back to Armenia by Pompey.)

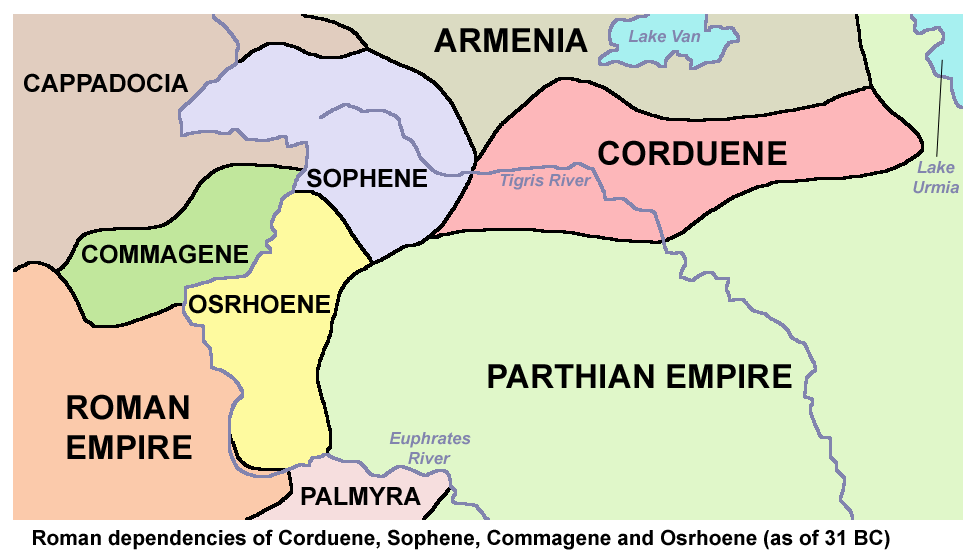
Roman dependency of Corduene (as of 31 BC)

According to Robert H. Hewsen, Gordyene emerged as a separate state in the aftermath of the collapse of Tigranes' empire and was subsequently given to various rulers by the Romans. It then regained its independence as a Parthian vassal state. Marciak, however, states that Gordyene came under the control of the kingdom of Adiabene until at least 115 AD. The Roman emperor Trajan (r. 98–117) conquered Gordyene during his campaign in northern Mesopotamia. A certain local ruler named Manisarus is mentioned in the narrative of John Xiphilinus (an 11th-century epitomizer of Dio Cassius) of Trajan's campaign. It has been suggested that this Manisarus was the king of Gordyene at the time, but this identification is rejected by Marciak. Hewsen writes that Trajan's successor Hadrian (r. 117–138) seems to have granted Gordyene to Armenia. Hewsen asserts that Gordyene (as Korchayk) was a part of Armenia at the time of the country's Christianization (c. 314) and thus assumes that it had been part of Armenia for the two intervening centuries since Hadrian's settlement. Marciak, on the other hand, believes that Gordyene likely remained under Adiabenian rule after 115, possibly until 298.

In 298, the Sasanian king Narseh (r. 293–303) was defeated by the caesar Galerius in Armenia and sued for peace. According to the Peace of Nisibis concluded that year, the Romans acquired several territories located, from their perspective, on the far side of the Tigris River, and thus called regiones Transtigritanae: Ingilene, Sophene, Arzanene, "[the territories] of the Karduenoi" (i.e. Gordyene, possibly as part of a larger territory), and Zabdicene. The Romans gained dicio over the transtigritane territories; dicio, as opposed to dominium, meant that internal matters were left to local authorities while Rome gained influence over the territories' foreign policy and possibly the right to a limited military presence. At least in the 4th century, the Romans recruited military units in these territories; the Notitia Dignitatum records the names of three such units: ala quintadecima Flavia Carduenorum, equites sagittarii Cordueni, and cohors quartadecima Valeria Zabdenorum. As the 5th-century Armenian history Buzandaran Patmutiwnk depicts the rulers of the territories ceded in 298 as having retained a place in the life of the Armenian kingdom, Hewsen (following Cyril Toumanoff) concludes that a form of "dual subordination" had been established whereby these princes answered to both the Armenian king and the Roman emperor. Marciak and others have criticized this view, considering such an arrangement to be impractical. According to the Buzandaran Patmutiwnk, during the reign of the King Khosrov III of Armenia (r. c. 330 – 338/339) the prince of Korduk (i.e. Gordyene), named Jon, was one of the loyal vassals of the King who suppressed the rebellion of the bdeashkh (military viceroy) of Arzanene.

According the Marciak, the Sasanians must have reacquired Gordyene by 359, as the Roman soldier and historian Ammianus Marcellinus, who was sent on a scouting mission to Gordyene just before the Persian invasion in 359, reports that country was under Persian rule through a satrap named Iovinianus. Iovinianus, whose name is Roman and who once lived in Roman territory as a hostage, may have been a member of a local dynasty that hereditarily ruled Gordyene in the 4th century. (Note: Garsoïan writes that Iovinianus should probably be identified with the Prince Jon of Korduk‘ mentioned in the Buzandaran Patmutiwnk. Hewsen writes "Whether or not the Jon of [Buzandaran Patmutiwnk] is the same individual as the Jovianianus [sic] of [Ammianus Marcellinus], or rather his father or grandfather, is uncertain.) Gordyene was officially ceded to the Sasanians in 363 and subsequently formed part of the new Sasanian province of Arbayistan.

Corduene was a bishop's see of the Church of the East since at least 424.

=== 6th and 7th centuries ===
In 578, the Byzantine emperor Maurice defeated the Sassanid army led by Chosroes I, and conquered Corduene and incorporated it once again in the Roman Empire. The Roman army also liberated 10,000 Christian captives of the Sassanids. According to Khwarizmi, Arabs conquered the area along with Nisbis and Tur Abdin in 640.

== Geography ==
=== Borders ===
The original territory of the Karduchoi was the mountainous region south of the Botan River (a tributary of the Tigris) and north of the modern-day city of Cizre, on the Tigris, in southeastern Turkey. After 401 BC, the Karduchoi expanded into the Upper Tigris valley located between the Batman and Khabur rivers. According to historian Michał Marciak, the Botan formed the western limit of Gordyene's presence in the Tigris valley for most of its ancient history. Before 95 BC, Gordyene expanded west of the Botan into the region later known as Arzanene; but, the two regions were separate again in the late 3rd and 4th centuries AD. Gordyene bordered Adiabene to the east; Marciak tentatively places the eastern border on the Little Khabur. He also considers it likely that Gordyene expanded north of the Botan River into the region of Moxoene. The Tigris formed its southern border, although there was interaction with the nomads of Mesopotamia which could have led to "at least a slight migration" of people from Gordyene over the Tigris. Geographically, the Gordyaean mountains were often considered to be part of the Armenian Taurus.

An alternative reconstruction of Gordyene's borders and their historical development is given by Robert H. Hewsen. Hewsen proposed that the original "kingdom" of the Karduchoi lay just west of the Zagros Mountains and east of the Little Khabur; this area must have been known as Korchayk or Korchēk to the Armenians. To the west of this kingdom, between the Little Khabur and the Tigris (i.e. where Marciak places the original territory of the Karduchoi) was the district of Tmorik (consisting of two districts: Korduk/Corduene in the west, and Tmorik proper in the east), which was conquered by Armenia in the mid-2nd century BC. Gordyene and Tmorik were apparently combined under the Armenian king Tigranes the Great (r. 95–55 BC), creating the large kingdom of Gordyene which Roman sources knew, spanning from the Tigris to the Zagros Mountains. Gordyene was again separated into two parts after its return to Armenia by the Roman emperor Hadrian (r. 117–138). The western part half was a principality called Korduk, and the eastern half was called Korchēk or possibly Kordrik and was probably crown land of the Armenian kings. Within Armenia, the prince of Korduk was the bdeashkh or vitaxa (military viceroy) of the "Assyrian March" (i.e. defending Armenia's border from the direction of Assyria).

=== Economy and settlements ===
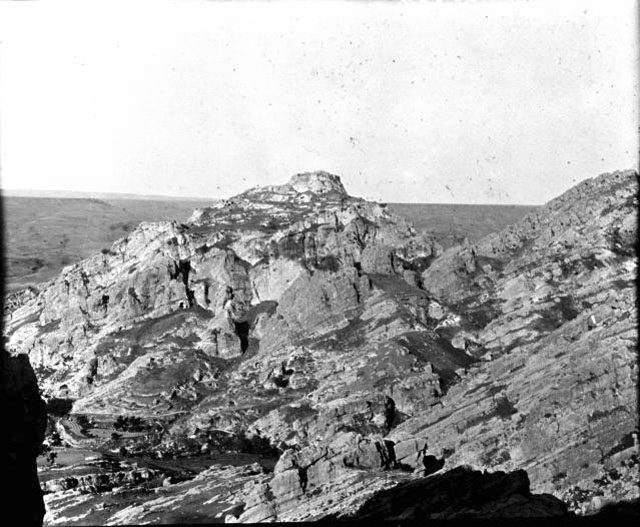
Castle of Pinaca (or Finik), northwest of Cizre

Both Classical and Talmudic sources attest to Gordyene's fertility and its wealth of natural resources (wheat, wine, pastures, naphtha, cardamom). Agriculture appears to have developed even further after the expansion of the Karduchoi into the Upper Tigris valley. Strabo records a tradition according to which Gordyene was settled by Gordys, son of Triptolemus, who most notably features in Greek mythology as the founder of agriculture. In Marciak's view, this association with Triptolemus "emphasizes the image of Gordyene as a country of fabulous agricultural wealth." Archaeological evidence indicates that the region was at its most prosperous during the Hellenistic period. Urbanization occurred in Gordyene during this period. Strabo records the existence of three cities of Gordyene, all located near the Tigris: Sareisa, Satalca, and Pinaca. Pinaca, which is called Bezabde and Phaenicha in the 4th-century history of Ammianus Marcellinus, has been identified with the archaeological site of Eski Finik (and nearby Eski Hendek) in modern-day Turkey. Hewsen writes that Pinaca was perhaps the capital of the kingdom of Gordyene. Eski Eruh and Shakh have been tentatively proposed as the sites of both Saresia and Satalca. The archaeological sites of the Kasrik area and Çattepe are also associated with Gordyene. According to Strabo, the Gordyaeans were famed as master-builders and skilled in the making of siege engines, for which purpose they were used by Tigranes the Great.

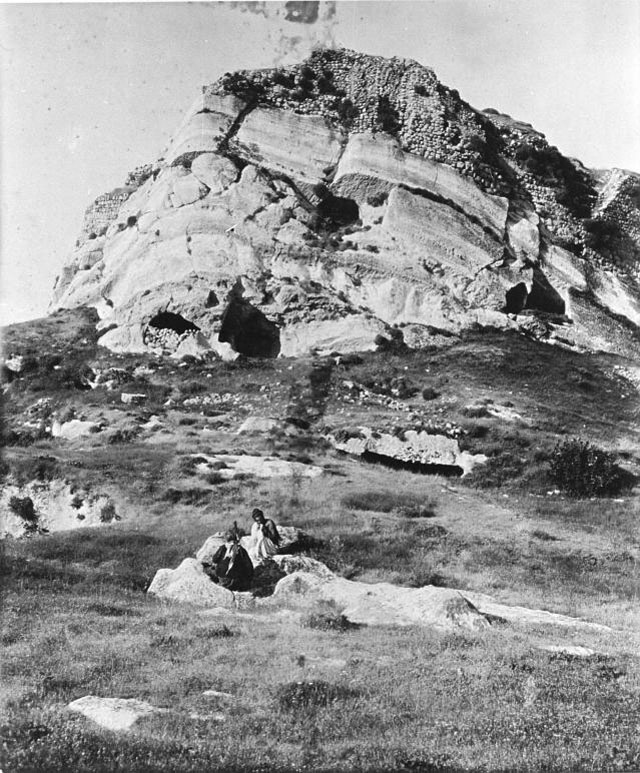
Castle of Pinaca (or Finik), northwest of Cizre

Gordyene's urban settlements had strategic significance, as they were situated near mountain passes and river crossings. Two important routes were in this area: the Bitlis Pass which took one north through the Taurus Mountains past Lake Van to Armenia and its capital of Artaxata; and the Tigris crossings which lay on the way from Nisibis to Media and Babylonia.

== In Jewish sources ==
This region is traditionally identified with the landing site in Deluge mythology. In the targumim, Noah's landing place after the flood is given as 'Qadron' or 'Qardu'. Jacob Neusner identifies the targumim's locations with Corduene. According to the Aggadah, Noah landed in Corduene in Armenia. The early 3rd century BCE Babylonian writer Berossus was also of the opinion that Xisuthros landed with his ship in Corduene. Josephus cited the evidence of Berossus as proof that the Flood was not a myth and also mentioned that the remains of the Ark were still visible in the district of Carron, presumably identical with Korduene.

Jewish sources trace the origins of the people of Corduene to the marriage of Jinns of King Solomon with 500 beautiful Jewish women.

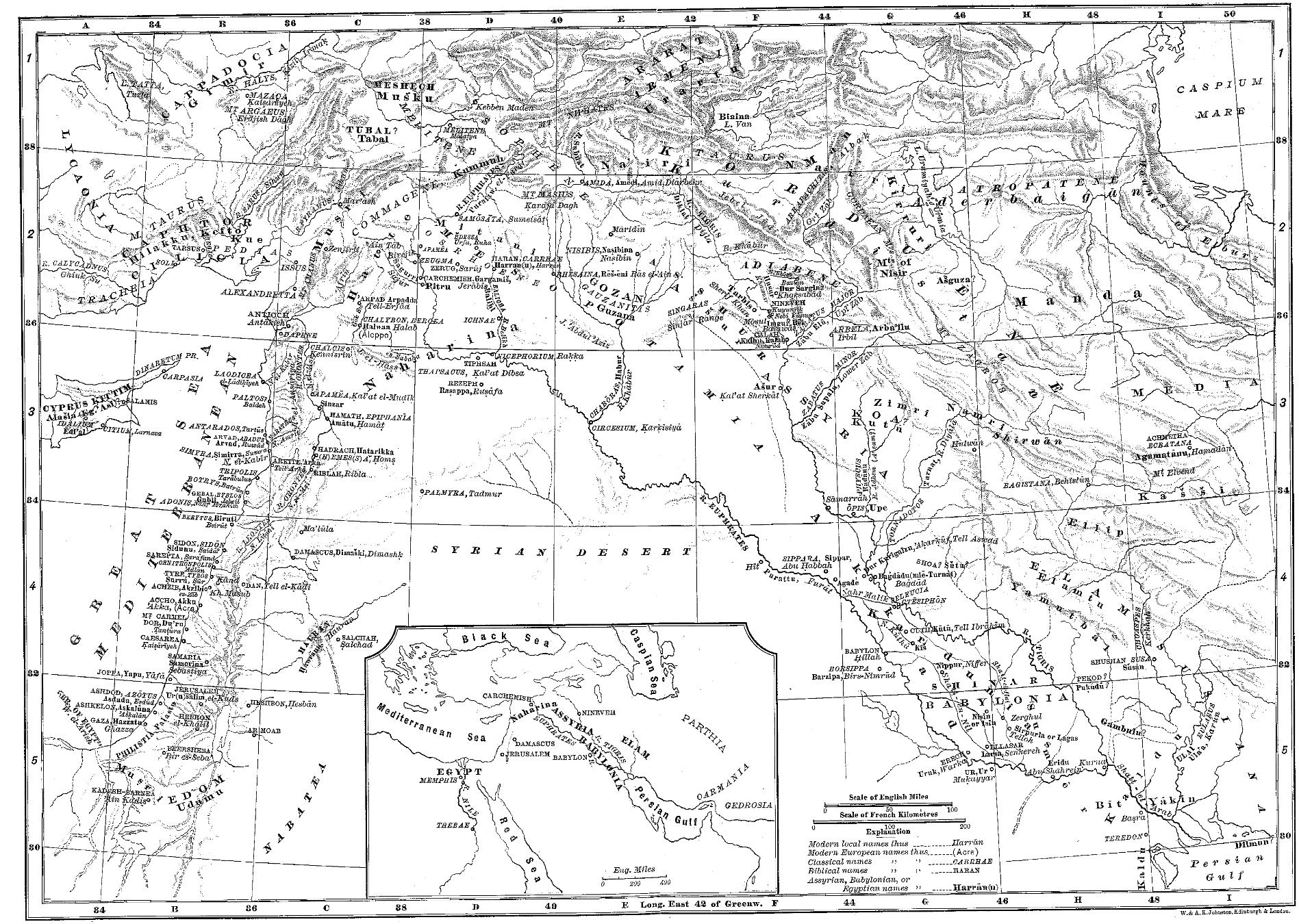
Korduene in northern and northeastern Mesopotamia; map from the Encyclopaedia Biblica

== Gordyene, Karduchoi, and the Kurds ==
Some identify Gordyene and the Karduchoi with the modern Kurds. It has been suggested that Corduene was proto-Kurdish.

Other modern scholars reject a Kurdish connection. Historian John Limbert, writing in 1968, states that "older scholarship believed that the modern Kurds were direct descendants of the Kardukhoi" but that "this view has been widely disputed since the beginning of the twentieth century." According to some scholars, it is more likely that the Kurds were descended from the Cyrtians, who appear in the works of Polybius, Livy, and Strabo.

There were numerous forms of this name, partly due to the difficulty of representing kh in Latin. The spelling Karduchoi is itself probably borrowed from Armenian, since the termination -choi represents the Armenian language plural suffix -k'. The singular form of the word is "Kardu". Xenophon writes that he learned the name of the tribe from an Armenian.

== See also ==
- Ark of Nuh or Noah
- Armenian highlands
- Mountains of Ararat
- Moxoene
- Thamanin
- Zagros Mountains
  - Mount Judi
