= Yeniaslanbaşar, Şırnak =

Village in Şırnak Province, Turkey

Yeniaslanbaşar
- Village
- Location within Turkey
- Coordinates: 37.622°N 42.352°E
- Country: Turkey
- Province: Şırnak
- District: Şırnak
- Population (2021): 2,975
- Time zone: UTC+3 (TRT)

Yeniaslanbaşar (Kurdish: Mila Kere) is a village in the central district of Şırnak Province in Turkey. The village is populated by Kurds of the Botikan tribe and had a population of 2,975 in 2021.

The six hamlets of Ballıca, Oğlakçı, Samanlık, Türkmen, Uzakçay and Üveyik are attached to Yeniaslanbaşar.
