= Bostancı, Silopi =

Village in Şırnak Province, Turkey

Bostancı
- Village
- Location within Turkey
- Coordinates: 37.176°N 42.329°E
- Country: Turkey
- Province: Şırnak
- District: Silopi
- Population (2023): 2,337
- Time zone: UTC+3 (TRT)

Bostancı (Kurdish: Rihanî) is a village in the Silopi District of Şırnak Province in Turkey. The village is populated by Kurds of the Sipêrtî and Tayan tribes and had a population of 2,337 in 2023.

The hamlets of Güven and Mağra are attached to Bostancı.

== Population ==
Population history from 2007 to 2023:

Population
Year	Pop.	±%
2007	2,610	—
2010	2,801	+7.3%
2015	2,713	−3.1%
2020	2,508	−7.6%
2023	2,337	−6.8%
