= Kırkkuyu, Şırnak =

Village in Şırnak Province, Turkey

Kırkkuyu
- Village
- Location within Turkey
- Coordinates: 37.477°N 42.150°E
- Country: Turkey
- Province: Şırnak
- District: Şırnak
- Population (2021): 105
- Time zone: UTC+3 (TRT)

Kırkkuyu (Kurdish: Deştalela) is a village in the central district of Şırnak Province in Turkey. The village is populated by Kurds of the Dêrşewî tribe and had a population of 105 in 2021. The hamlets of Sucular and Şişli are attached to Kırkkuyu.

The village was depopulated in the 1990s during the Kurdish–Turkish conflict.
