= Özgen, Silopi =

Village in Şırnak Province, Turkey

Özgen
- Village
- Location within Turkey
- Coordinates: 37.237°N 42.527°E
- Country: Turkey
- Province: Şırnak
- District: Silopi
- Population (2023): 421
- Time zone: UTC+3 (TRT)

Özgen (Kurdish: Selatûn) is a village in the Silopi District of Şırnak Province in Turkey. The village had a population of 421 in 2023.

== Population ==
Population history from 2007 to 2023:

Population
| Year | Pop. | ±% |
|---|---|---|
| 2007 | 389 | — |
| 2010 | 428 | +10.0% |
| 2015 | 488 | +14.0% |
| 2020 | 460 | −5.7% |
| 2023 | 421 | −8.5% |
