= Güneyçam, Şırnak =

Village in Şırnak Province, Turkey

Güneyçam
- Village
- Location within Turkey
- Coordinates: 37.646°N 42.457°E
- Country: Turkey
- Province: Şırnak
- District: Şırnak
- Population (2021): 490
- Time zone: UTC+3 (TRT)

Güneyçam (Kurdish: Navyan) is a village in the central district of Şırnak Province in Turkey. The village is populated by Kurds of the Botikan tribe and had a population of 1,219 in 2021. The hamlets of Bilecik (Cinîwer), İkizdere, Küllüce (Bêlûzer) and Tahtiyan are attached to Güneyçam.

The village was depopulated in the 1990s during the Kurdish–Turkish conflict.
