= Ortaköy, Silopi =

Village in Şırnak Province, Turkey

Ortaköy
- Village
- Location within Turkey
- Coordinates: 37.196°N 42.447°E
- Country: Turkey
- Province: Şırnak
- District: Silopi
- Population (2023): 949
- Time zone: UTC+3 (TRT)

Ortaköy (Kurdish: Gundhedît) is a village in the Silopi District of Şırnak Province in Turkey. The village is populated by Kurds of non-tribal affiliation and had a population of 949 in 2023.

== Population ==
Population history from 2007 to 2023:

Population
Year	Pop.	±%
2007	727	—
2010	784	+7.8%
2015	899	+14.7%
2020	1,000	+11.2%
2023	949	−5.1%
