= Pınarönü, Silopi =

Village in Şırnak Province, Turkey

Pınarönü
- Village
- Location within Turkey
- Coordinates: 37.280°N 42.334°E
- Country: Turkey
- Province: Şırnak
- District: Silopi
- Population (2023): 957
- Time zone: UTC+3 (TRT)

Pınarönü (Kurdish: Eywan) is a village in the Silopi District of Şırnak Province in Turkey. The village is populated by Kurds of non-tribal affiliation and had a population of 957 in 2023.

The hamlet of Çukurca is attached to Pınarönü.

== Population ==
Population history from 2007 to 2023:

Population
Year	Pop.	±%
2007	1,371	—
2010	1,490	+8.7%
2015	1,733	+16.3%
2020	928	−46.5%
2023	957	+3.1%
