= Finik =

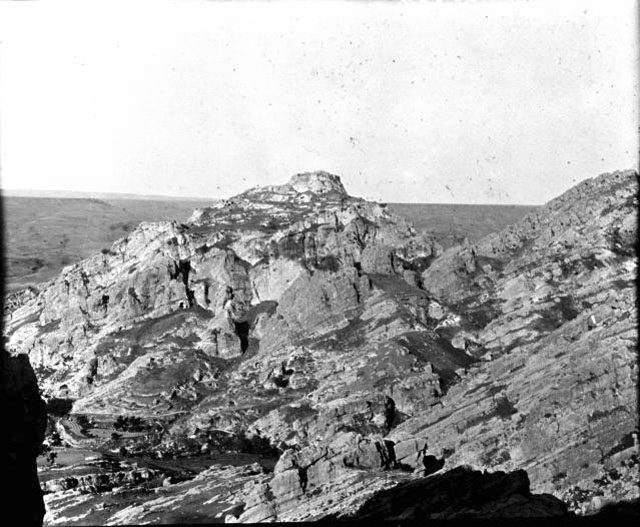
- View of the ruins at Finik (the ancient Pinaca)

- Location within Turkey
- Coordinates: 37°25′N 42°05′E
- Country: Turkey
- Province: Şırnak

Finik is an archaeological site in southeastern Turkey. It is located on the rocky cliffs overlooking the eastern bank of the Tigris, 14 kilometers upstream from the city of Cizre. It has been identified with the ancient Pinaka, mentioned by Strabo as one of the principal cities of the region of Gordyene. The medieval Islamic medieval writers al-Ya'qubi and Abu'l-Fida, who called the site Fenek or Fanak, described it as the site of an impregnable fortress, the ruins of which still stand.

It gained the attention of some scholars in the late 19th and early 20th centuries, but was not studied thereafter, perhaps in part due to the difficulty of accessing it, with only trails leading along the bottom of the cliffs allowing access. The site is primarily characterized by a prominent rocky outcrop overlooking the Tigris valley, upon which there are the scattered ruins of Islamic-era fortifications. These appear to correspond to the fortress mentioned by al-Ya'qubi and Abu'l-Fida. Some of these ruins also appear to be quite recent.

There is also a Parthian rock relief carved into the face of a cliff rising perpendicular to the Tigris, facing northeast, towards the rocky spur that supported the old fortress. It depicts two people, in what appears to be a scene of homage or investiture, with the figure on the left appears to be nobility or royalty, bearing a sword and finely dressed. The relief was probably created in the second half of the second century CE or the beginning of the third, and resembles those found at the sites of Hatra, Palmyra, and Dura-Europos. The sculptor at Finik was probably familiar with the style and techniques used at those places. This relief was first noted by A.H. Layard in 1849.

A second Parthian rock relief is also present, located on a concave wall cut into the rock of the north face of the main rock outcrop, although it is rudimentary and nothing but the outline can be discerned. It was probably carved hastily or by a less skilled sculptor.
