= Geçitboyu, Şırnak =

Village in Şırnak Province, Turkey

Geçitboyu
- Village
- Location within Turkey
- Coordinates: 37.492°N 42.518°E
- Country: Turkey
- Province: Şırnak
- District: Şırnak
- Population (2021): 1,557
- Time zone: UTC+3 (TRT)

Geçitboyu (Kurdish: Bîryan) is a village in the central district of Şırnak Province in Turkey. The village is populated by Kurds of the Berwarî tribe and had a population of 1,557 in 2021.

The hamlet of Ilıca is attached to Geçitboyu.
