= Ovaköy, Silopi =

Village in Şırnak Province, Turkey

Ovaköy
- Village
- Location within Turkey
- Coordinates: 37.127°N 42.423°E
- Country: Turkey
- Province: Şırnak
- District: Silopi
- Population (2023): 175
- Time zone: UTC+3 (TRT)

Ovaköy (Kurdish: Korava) is a village in the Silopi District of Şırnak Province in Turkey. The village is populated by Kurds of the Tayan tribe and had a population of 175 in 2023.

The hamlet of Bayındır is attached to Ovaköy.

== Population ==
Population history from 2007 to 2023:

Population
| Year | Pop. | ±% |
|---|---|---|
| 2007 | 30 | — |
| 2010 | 41 | +36.7% |
| 2015 | 206 | +402.4% |
| 2020 | 200 | −2.9% |
| 2023 | 175 | −12.5% |
