= Damlaca, Silopi =

Village in Şırnak Province, Turkey

Damlaca
- Village
- Location within Turkey
- Coordinates: 37.317°N 42.707°E
- Country: Turkey
- Province: Şırnak
- District: Silopi
- Population (2023): 285
- Time zone: UTC+3 (TRT)

Damlaca also known as Beşiktaş (Kurdish: Silib) is a village in the Silopi District of Şırnak Province in Turkey. The village is populated by Kurds and had a population of 285 in 2023.

It was burned by authorities in the early 1990s, during the Kurdish–Turkish conflict.

== Population ==
Population history from 2007 to 2023:

Population
Year	Pop.	±%
2007	107	—
2010	116	+8.4%
2015	322	+177.6%
2020	286	−11.2%
2023	285	−0.3%
