= Mahmutlu, Silopi =

Village in Şırnak Province, Turkey

Mahmutlu
- Village
- Location within Turkey
- Coordinates: 37.235°N 42.396°E
- Country: Turkey
- Province: Şırnak
- District: Silopi
- Population (2023): 1,016
- Time zone: UTC+3 (TRT)

Mahmutlu (Kurdish: Serebiye) is a village in the Silopi District of Şırnak Province in Turkey. The village is populated by Kurds of the Tayan tribe and had a population of 1,016 in 2023.

The hamlet of Otludere is attached to Mahmutlu.

== Population ==
Population history from 2007 to 2023:

Population
Year	Pop.	±%
2015	937	—
2020	1,009	+7.7%
2023	1,016	+0.7%
