= Şırnak District =

District in Şırnak Province, Turkey

- District
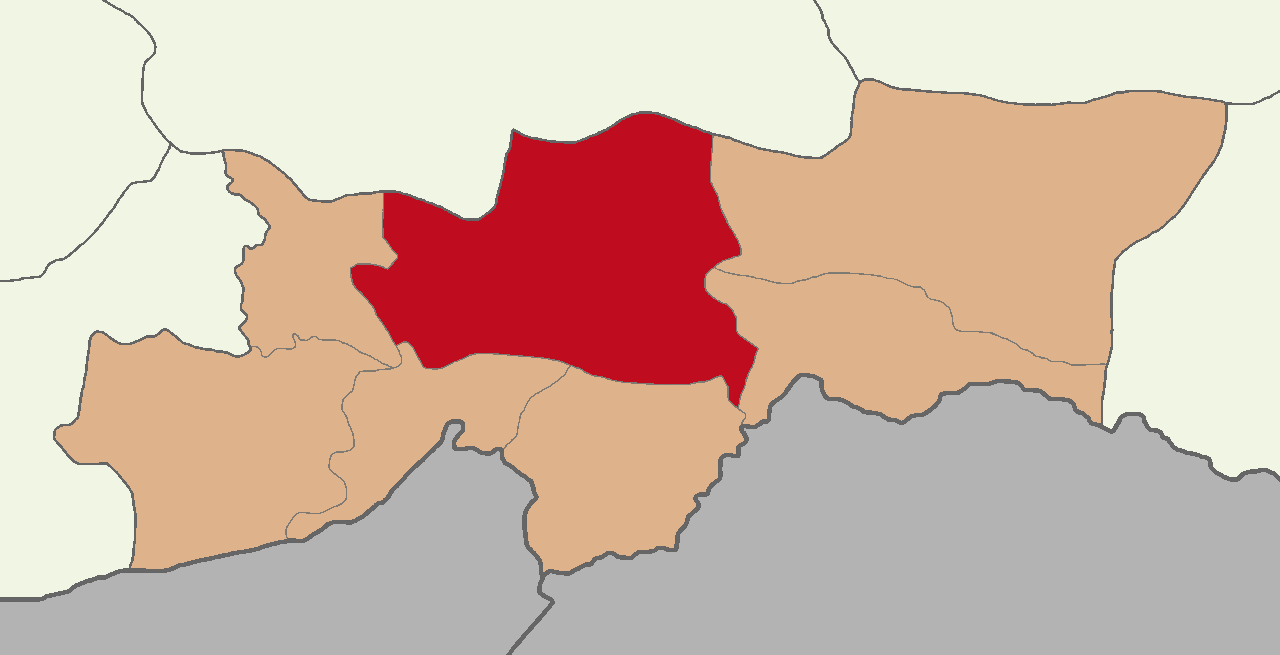
- Map showing Şırnak District in Şırnak Province

- Location in Turkey
- Coordinates: 37°33′N 42°26′E
- Country: Turkey
- Province: Şırnak
- Seat: Şırnak
- Area: 1,701 km^{2} (657 sq mi)
- Population (2023): 108,699
  - Density: 63.90/km^{2} (165.5/sq mi)
- Time zone: UTC+3 (TRT)

Şırnak District (also: Merkez, meaning "central" in Turkish) is a district of the Şırnak Province of Turkey and encompasses the main provincial city of Şırnak. In 2023, the district had a population of 108,699. Its area is 1,701 km^{2}.

== Settlements ==
Şırnak District contains three beldes, thirty-eight villages of which nineteen are unpopulated and fifty-nine hamlets.

=== Municipalities ===
1. Balveren (Melê)
2. Kasrik
3. Kumçatı (Dergul)
4. Şırnak

=== Villages ===
1. Akçay (Dêra)
2. Alkemer (Dêrşew)
3. Anılmış (Gundikê Remo)
4. Araköy (Kirun)
5. Atbaşı (Fêrisan)
6. Bağpınar (Çînete)
7. Başağaç (Medikeyan)
8. Boyunkaya (Sipîndarok)
9. Cevizdüzü (Cifane)
10. Çadırlı (Kendalî)
11. Çakırsöğüt (Şîlyan)
12. Dağkonak (Nerex)
13. Dereler (Avyan)
14. Geçitboyu (Bîryan)
15. Görmeç (Bîyave)
16. Güleşli (Berê Mirê)
17. Günedoğmuş (Qernêh)
18. Güneyce (Navyan)
19. Güneyçam (Banê)
20. İkizce (Milga Şantiyê)
21. İnceler (Basret)
22. Kapanlı (Êrê)
23. Karageçit (Sipîvyan)
24. Kavuncu (Nanîp)
25. Kayaboyun (Şerefî)
26. Kemerli (Gilindur)
27. Kırkkuyu (Deştalela)
28. Kızılsu (Zûrîn)
29. Koçağılı (Bêsûkê)
30. Koçbeyi (Banê Mihinda)
31. Körüklükaya (Nehke)
32. Kuşkonar (Giver)
33. Seslice (Meydin)
34. Tekçınar (Berkevir)
35. Toptepe (Avka Meziyan)
36. Üçkıraz (Nêvava)
37. Yeniaslanbaşar (Mila Kere)
38. Yoğurtçular (Heştan)

== Population ==
Population history from 2007 to 2023:

Population
Year	Pop.	±%
2007	78,231	—
2010	77,865	−0.5%
2015	92,206	+18.4%
2020	96,285	+4.4%
2023	108,699	+12.9%

== See also ==
- Kuşkonar and Koçağılı massacre
