= Dedeler, Silopi =

Village in Şırnak Province, Turkey

Dedeler
- Village
- Location within Turkey
- Coordinates: 37.293°N 42.447°E
- Country: Turkey
- Province: Şırnak
- District: Silopi
- Population (2023): 23
- Time zone: UTC+3 (TRT)

Dedeler (Kurdish: Babika) is a village in the Silopi District of Şırnak Province in Turkey. The village had a population of 23 in 2023.

== Population ==
Population history from 2007 to 2023:

Population
Year	Pop.	±%
2007	33	—
2010	26	−21.2%
2015	35	+34.6%
2020	25	−28.6%
2023	23	−8.0%
