= Aktepe, Silopi =

Village in Şırnak Province, Turkey

Aktepe
- Village
- Location within Turkey
- Coordinates: 37.161°N 42.529°E
- Country: Turkey
- Province: Şırnak
- District: Silopi
- Population (2023): 545
- Time zone: UTC+3 (TRT)

Aktepe (Kurdish: Girê Gewre) is a village in the Silopi District of Şırnak Province in Turkey. The village is populated by Kurds of the Zewkan tribe and had a population of 545 in 2023.

== Population ==
Population history from 2007 to 2023:

Population
Year	Pop.	±%
2007	378	—
2010	409	+8.2%
2015	454	+11.0%
2020	556	+22.5%
2023	545	−2.0%
