= İkizce, Şırnak =

Village in Şırnak Province, Turkey

İkizce
- Village
- Location within Turkey
- Coordinates: 37.466°N 42.339°E
- Country: Turkey
- Province: Şırnak
- District: Şırnak
- Population (2021): 783
- Time zone: UTC+3 (TRT)

İkizce (Kurdish: Milga Şantiyê) is a village in the central district of Şırnak Province in Turkey. The village is populated by Kurds and had a population of 783 in 2021.

The two hamlets of Çavuşdede and Yarımkaya are attached to İkizce.

İkizce was burned by authorities in the early 1990s, during the Kurdish–Turkish conflict.
