= Esenli, Silopi =

Village in Şırnak Province, Turkey

Esenli
- Village
- Location within Turkey
- Coordinates: 37.286°N 42.445°E
- Country: Turkey
- Province: Şırnak
- District: Silopi
- Population (2023): 71
- Time zone: UTC+3 (TRT)

Esenli (Kurdish: Germkê) is a village in the Silopi District of Şırnak Province in Turkey. The village had a population of 71 in 2023.

The hamlet of Onurlu is attached to Esenli.

== History ==
The village's former name, recorded as Germik in 1928, meant "thermal spring" in Kurdish. Villagers who had left the settlements at the foot of Mount Cudi in the 1990s, when the area was placed under restricted-zone status, returned to their fields there in 2014.

The village was formerly attached to the Silopi district of Mardin Province; it was transferred to the newly created Şırnak Province's Silopi district in 1990. The village was evacuated in 1993 on security grounds during the conflict with the PKK, and reopened for settlement in 2006 under the government's village-return and rehabilitation programme.

== Geography ==
The village lies 1 km from the centre of Şırnak and 6 km from the centre of Silopi district, in the north of Silopi, connected to the district centre by a village road.

== Population ==
Population history from 2007 to 2023:

Population
Year	Pop.	±%
2007	10	—
2010	0	−100.0%
2015	42	—
2020	40	−4.8%
2023	71	+77.5%
