= Güneyce, Şırnak =

Village in Şırnak Province, Turkey

Güneyce
- Village
- Location within Turkey
- Coordinates: 37.565°N 42.287°E
- Country: Turkey
- Province: Şırnak
- District: Şırnak
- Population (2021): 181
- Time zone: UTC+3 (TRT)

Güneyce (Kurdish: Banê) is a village in the central district of Şırnak Province in Turkey. The village is populated by Kurds of the Botikan tribe and had a population of 181 in 2021. The hamlet of Çiftekavak is attached to Güneyce.

The village was depopulated in the 1990s during the Kurdish–Turkish conflict.
