= Kızılsu, Şırnak =

Village in Şırnak Province, Turkey

Kızılsu
- Village
- Location within Turkey
- Coordinates: 37.457°N 42.200°E
- Country: Turkey
- Province: Şırnak
- District: Şırnak
- Population (2023): 2,671
- Time zone: UTC+3 (TRT)

Kızılsu (Kurdish: Zûrîn) is a village in the central district of Şırnak Province in Turkey. The village is populated by Kurds of the Botikan tribe and had a population of 2,671 in 2023. The two hamlets of Karınca and Soluklu are attached to Kızılsu.

The village was depopulated in the 1990s during the Kurdish–Turkish conflict.

== Population ==
Historical population
Year	Pop.	±% p.a.
1965	379	—
1985	751	+3.48%
1990	798	+1.22%
1997	1,436	+8.76%
2007	2,146	+4.10%
2012	2,221	+0.69%
2017	2,441	+1.91%
2023	2,671	+1.51%
Source: Population censuses (1965-1997) and TÜİK (2007-2023)
