= Koçbeyi, Şırnak =

Village in Şırnak Province, Turkey

Koçbeyi
- Village
- Location within Turkey
- Coordinates: 37.406°N 42.191°E
- Country: Turkey
- Province: Şırnak
- District: Şırnak
- Population (2021): 1,336
- Time zone: UTC+3 (TRT)

Akçay (Kurdish: Banê Mihinda) is a village in the central district of Şırnak Province in Turkey. The village is populated by Kurds of the Botikan tribe and had a population of 1,336 in 2021. The three hamlets of Bürücek, Durmuşlu and Sarıyar are attached to Koçbeyi.

The village was depopulated in the 1990s during the Kurdish–Turkish conflict.
