= Akyıldız, Silopi =

Village in Şırnak Province, Turkey

Akyıldız
- Village
- Location within Turkey
- Coordinates: 37.296°N 42.337°E
- Country: Turkey
- Province: Şırnak
- District: Silopi
- Population (2023): 762
- Time zone: UTC+3 (TRT)

Akyıldız (Kurdish: Babindak) is a village in the Silopi District of Şırnak Province in Turkey. The village is populated by Kurds of the Tayan tribe and had a population of 762 in 2023.

== Population ==
Population history from 2020 to 2023:

Population
Year	Pop.	±%
2020	827	—
2023	762	−7.9%
