= Chaldean Catholic Eparchy of Gazarta =

The Chaldean Catholic eparchy of Gazarta, named for the town of Jezira (modern Cizre), known in Syriac as Gazarta d'Beth Zabdai, was established on a stable basis in the early nineteenth century. Many of the Chaldean Catholics of the Gazarta region, including the bishop of Gazarta Pilipus Yaqub Orahim, were killed during the Sayfo during 1914-1918. On 3 July 1957, it was suppressed and its territory divided between the Chaldean Catholic Archeparchy of Diarbekir (Amida), the Chaldean Catholic Eparchy of Aleppo and the newly established Chaldean Catholic Eparchy of Beirut.

== Chaldean Catholic bishops of Gazarta ==
The first nineteenth-century bishop of Gazarta was Giwargis Peter di Natale, who was consecrated for Gazarta in 1833 by the patriarch Yohannan VIII Hormizd and transferred to the diocese of ʿAmadiya in 1842.

The patriarch Nicholas I Zayʿa appointed Basil Asmar, previously administrator of the diocese of Amid, to the diocese of Gazarta in 1842. Basil was metropolitan of Gazarta for nine years, and Badger noted in 1850 that 'he seldom resides at Jezeerah'. He retired due to old age and ill health in 1851.

The patriarch Joseph VI Audo sent the priest ʿAbdishoʿ Dosho (later metropolitan of ʿAmadiya) to Gazarta in his place for a year, and appointed Jerome Paul Hindi metropolitan of Gazarta in 1852. Hindi was metropolitan of Gazarta until 1873, and was succeeded by Eliya Peter ʿAbulyonan (1874–8), who became patriarch in 1879 after Audo's death.

In 1875, the monk Philip Abraham of the monastery of Notre Dame des Semences, who was born in Telkepe in 1848 and became a priest in 1873, was consecrated metropolitan for India by Joseph VI Audo, who was then challenging the authority of the Padroado jurisdiction in India. He was recalled from India in 1881 by Eliya XII ʿAbulyonan on instructions from the Vatican, and was transferred to the diocese of Gazarta in 1882, taking the name Mar Yaʿqob. He was among the many Chaldean Catholic clergy murdered in the Armenian massacres of 1915. He was the last metropolitan of Gazarta. The Chaldean Catholic population of the Gazarta district was greatly reduced in the First World War in the Sayfo, and the diocese of Gazarta was not revived afterwards.

== Population statistics ==
In 1867 the diocese of Gazarta contained 20 villages and had a population of 7,000 Chaldean Catholics, served by 10 qashe (priests). In 1896 the diocese had a population of 5,500 Chaldean Catholics, and contained 16 parishes or stations, 20 churches, and 14 qashe (priests), assisted by a Dominican mission and a mission of the Sisters of Preservation at Gazarta (Chabot). The largest villages in the diocese were Gazarta, Hoz and Mer, Harbol, Peshabur, Taqian, Girik Bedro, Wasta and Tel Qabin.

In 1913 the diocese included 17 villages, and had 17 qashe (priests) and 6,400 civilians (Tfinkdji).

Chaldean communities in the diocese of Gazarta, 1913

Name of Village	Name in Syriac	Number of Believers	Number of Priests	Number of Churches	Name of Village	Name in Syriac	Number of Believers	Number of Priests	Number of Churches
Gazarta	ܓܙܪܬܐ	600	2	1	Mansuriya		80	0	0
Taqian		900	3	1	Eshe		200	1	1
Peshabur	ܦܝܫ ܚܒܘܪ	1,300	2	1	Bazian		150	0	1
Wasta		520	1	1	Haltun		100	1	0
Tel Qabin		450	1	1	Akol		180	1	0
Hoz and Mer		500	1	1	Dissiun		160	0	0
Harbol		300	1	1	Mar Sabrisho		100	1	0
Girik Bedro		600	1	1	Shah		140	1	1
Nahrawan		120	0	0	Total		6,400	17	11

The diocese was ruined in the First World War during the Sayfo, and in 1928 there were only 1,600 Chaldean Catholics remaining in its former territory, without a qasha (priest) (Tisserant). In 1937 there were 2,250 Chaldean Catholics, with a qasha (priest) and a church (Kajo).

== List of bishops ==
The following is a list of incumbents of the Chaldean Catholic diocese of Gazarta:

- Gabriele Elia (1567 – death 1600)
- Giuseppe (1600 – 1635 deposed)
- Simone Giuseppe (1636 – death 1672?)
- Ebed Jesu (1672 – death 1710)
- Giuseppe (1711 – death 1747)
- Giovanni (1747 – death 1776)
- Hnan Jesu (1785 – death 1826?)
- Giwargis Peter de Natali (1833 – 1842), later Eparch (Bishop) of Chaldean Catholic successor diocese Diarbekir (= Amida, also in Turkey, now an Archeparchy) (1842 – death 1867.08.13)
- Basile Mansur Asmar (1842 – 1851), previously in successor dioceses Eparch (Bishop) of Amadiyah (Iraq) (1824 – 1828) and Eparch of Diarbekir of the Chaldeans (Turkey) (1828 – death 1842)
- Jerome Paul Hindi (1852 – 1873)
- Eliya Abulyonan [Abbo-Alyonan] (1874 – 1878.07.26), later Patriarch of Babylon of the Chaldeans (Iraq) ([1878.07.26] 1879.02.28 – death 1894.06.27)
- Philippe-Jacques Abraham, Antonian Order of Saint Ormizda of the Chaldeans (O.A.O.C.) (1882.02.10 – death 1915.08.26)
- Apostolic Administrator Gabriel Naamo (1938.09.30 – 1957.06.27)
- Giordano de Rudder, Dominicans (O.P.) (1941 – 1946).
