= Silopi District =

District in Şırnak Province, Turkey

- District
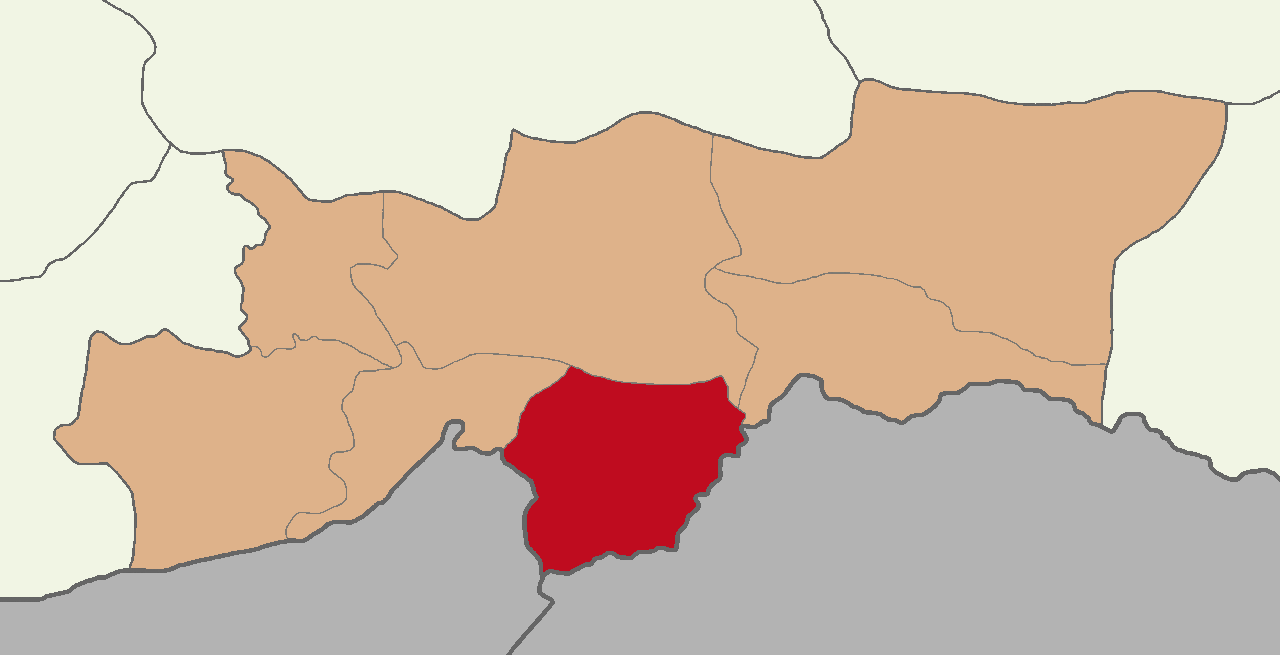
- Map showing Silopi District in Şırnak Province

- Location in Turkey
- Coordinates: 37°16′N 42°30′E
- Country: Turkey
- Province: Şırnak
- Seat: Silopi
- Area: 831 km^{2} (321 sq mi)
- Population (2023): 148,126
  - Density: 178/km^{2} (462/sq mi)
- Time zone: UTC+3 (TRT)

Silopi District is a district of the Şırnak Province of Turkey. The seat of the district is the town of Silopi and the population was 148,126 in 2023. Its area is 831 km^{2}.

== Settlements ==
Silopi District contains three beldes, thirty-three villages, of which seven are unpopulated, and moreover twenty-one hamlets.

=== Municipalities ===
1. Başverimli (Wehsid)
2. Çalışkan (Gitê)
3. Görümlü (Bêspin)
4. Silopi

=== Villages ===
1. Aksu (Herbol)
2. Aktepe (Girê Gewre)
3. Akyıldız (Babindak)
4. Ballıkaya (Bilga)
5. Başak (Zêdga)
6. Birlikköy (Cumayî)
7. Bostancı (Rihanî)
8. Buğdaylı (Taqyan)
9. Çardaklı (Kûlya)
10. Çiftlikköy (Bedrû)
11. Damlaca (Silib)
12. Dedeler (Babika)
13. Derebaşı (Girêçolya)
14. Doruklu (Xezayî)
15. Düzalan (Fêrikan)
16. Esenli (Germkê)
17. Kapılı (Kukît)
18. Karacaköy (Sorbitmê)
19. Kavaközü (Ribêyî)
20. Kavallı (Nêrwan)
21. Koyunören (Bêşer)
22. Kösreli (Hesena)
23. Mahmutlu
24. Ortaköy (Gundhedît)
25. Ovaköy (Korava)
26. Özgen (Seletûn)
27. Pınarönü (Eywan)
28. Selçik (Derêdefş)
29. Uyanık (Xinis)
30. Üçağaç (Şivesor, Besta Belega)
31. Yazıköy (Şemika)
32. Yeniköy (Xirabreşik)
33. Yolağzı (Girkûnda)

== Population ==
Population history from 2007 to 2023:

Population
Year	Pop.	±% p.a.
2007	96,690	—
2010	104,094	+2.49%
2015	121,463	+3.13%
2020	138,814	+2.71%
2023	148,126	+2.19%
