= Yoğurtçular, Şırnak =

Village in Şırnak Province, Turkey

Yoğurtçular
- Village
- Location within Turkey
- Coordinates: 37.493°N 42.477°E
- Country: Turkey
- Province: Şırnak
- District: Şırnak
- Population (2021): 700
- Time zone: UTC+3 (TRT)

Yoğurtçular (Kurdish: Heştan) is a village in the central district of Şırnak Province in Turkey. The village is populated by Kurds of the Şirnexî tribe and had a population of 700 in 2021.

The hamlets of Gözlüce (Zorava), Ortaklar and Özveren (Dehlabî) are attached to Yoğurtçular.
