= Doruklu, Silopi =

Village in Şırnak Province, Turkey

Doruklu
- Village
- Location within Turkey
- Coordinates: 37.259°N 42.323°E
- Country: Turkey
- Province: Şırnak
- District: Silopi
- Population (2023): 1,306
- Time zone: UTC+3 (TRT)

Doruklu (Kurdish: Xezayî) is a village in the Silopi District of Şırnak Province in Turkey. The village is populated by Kurds of the Tayan tribe and had a population of 1,306 in 2023.

== Population ==
Population history from 2007 to 2023:

Population
Year	Pop.	±%
2007	1,218	—
2010	1,230	+1.0%
2015	1,308	+6.3%
2020	1,289	−1.5%
2023	1,306	+1.3%
