= Üçağaç, Silopi =

Village in Şırnak Province, Turkey

Üçağaç
- Village
- Location within Turkey
- Coordinates: 37.297°N 42.393°E
- Country: Turkey
- Province: Şırnak
- District: Silopi
- Population (2021): 862
- Time zone: UTC+3 (TRT)

Üçağaç (Kurdish: Şivesor) is a village in the Silopi District of Şırnak Province in Turkey. The village is populated by Kurds of the Tayan tribe and had a population of 862 in 2023.

The hamlets of Poyraz, Şemalbeg and Taşlıca are attached to Üçağaç.

== Population ==
Population history from 2007 to 2023:

Population
Year	Pop.	±%
2007	348	—
2010	437	+25.6%
2015	662	+51.5%
2020	853	+28.9%
2023	862	+1.1%
