= Bağpınar, Şırnak =

Village in Şırnak Province, Turkey

Bağpınar
- Village
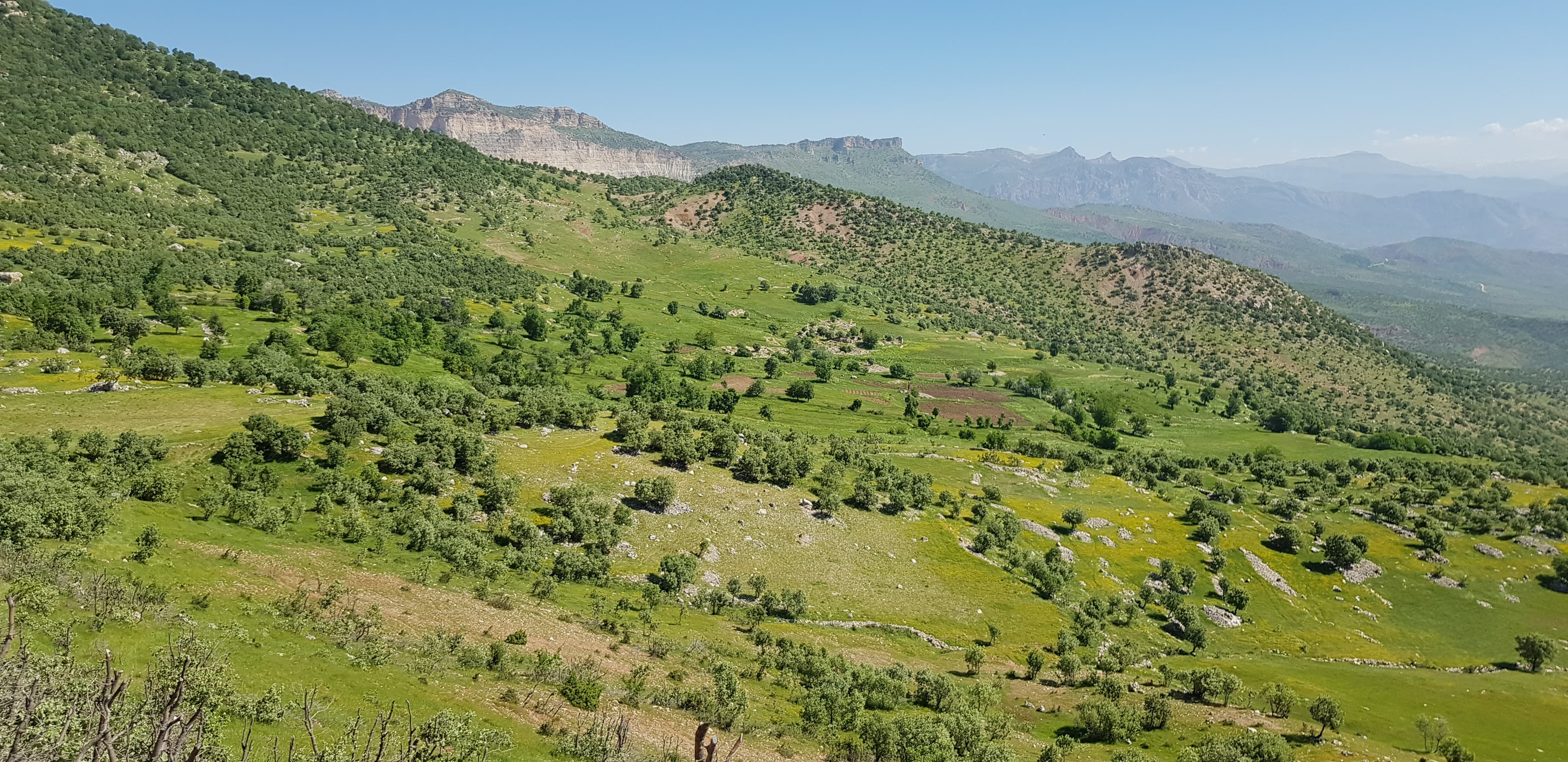

- Location within Turkey
- Coordinates: 37.479°N 42.203°E
- Country: Turkey
- Province: Şırnak
- District: Şırnak
- Population (2021): 24
- Time zone: UTC+3 (TRT)

Bağpınar (Kurdish: Cînete, Syriac: Cinet, Ĝinet) is a village in the central district of Şırnak Province in Turkey. The village is populated by Kurds of the Botikan tribe and had a population of 24 in 2021. The hamlet of Çanaklı is attached to Bağpınar.

The village was depopulated in the 1990s during the Kurdish–Turkish conflict.

== Origin and meaning of the name ==
The name Cinet comes from the Aramaic word genta, which means garden. Strictly speaking, Cinet means the Garden of Eden. In the Thesaurus Syriacus, the Garden of Eden is given with the Aramaic words gannat 'den. In the Hebrew and Aramaic dictionaries, this meaning refers specifically to a water-rich garden.

While Professor Jastrow uses the spelling Ginet, Noorlander uses the spelling Jinnet. Khan uses the form Jinet.

Professor Jastrow writes that the place name Ginet is Aramaic. Kurdish-speakers add another letter, an -e, to the name, so that the place is called Ginete (Cinete).

Through the process of Turkification, the name Cinet was changed to the Turkish name Bagpinar. The process of the name change can be reconstructed from official documents. The old name Cinit is still used in land registers from the 1930s. In current extracts from the residents' registration offices, only the Turkish version Bagpinar is used. The denomination Christian (= Hristiyan) can also be taken from these population registers.

Change of name in official documents
Old name Cinit	New name Bagpinar
Land register from the 1930s	Extract from the population register of Cinet (Bagpinar) in 1986

== Language ==
The language of the villagers of Cinet is an Aramaic dialect, which is referred to in science by the abbreviation NENA. The Assyrian inhabitants themselves call their dialect Suret. This language is also called Aramaic, Assyrian or Classical Syriac. It is a dialect that has developed from the old Aramaic, which was the lingu franca of the civilized world at the time of the Assyrian Empire, as well as at the time of the Babylonian and Persian Empires, i.e. the most widely used commercial language in the world. Ethnically speaking, the people who speak Suret are Assyrians, descended from the indigenous people of Mesopotamia. Professor Jastrow made tape recordings of Ginet. To his surprise, Professor Jastrow found that two dialects are quite similar to the dialect of Hertevin, namely the dialects of the two westernmost villages of Ginet and Dera. Professor Jastrow formulates the assumption that the dialects of Hertevin, Ginet and Dera are relics of a larger group.

The language, which was spoken in Jinnet is familiar to lot of other christian dialects from Mesopotamia.

Noorlander also notes that the Christian Aramaic dialects of the three villages of Artun Hertevin), Umṛa and Jinnet have much in common.

The grammatical peculiarity of the New Aramaic dialect spoken in Jinnet is emphasized by Khan and Noorlander. Non-distinct phonological verbal person marking is found in Neo-Aramaic. The dialects of Umṛa and Jinnet (Noorlander fieldnotes) use the L-suffixes for all grammatical functions in the preterit constructions based on qṭil-.

== Current village life ==
In April 2024, the village festival in honor of St. George, Mor Giwargis, was celebrated for the first time in almost 40 years. Mor Giwargis is the patron saint of the village of Cinet, which is also the name of the village's church, which was destroyed a long time ago.
