= Manisarus =

Manisarus of Corduene
- King
- Reign: ca. 115

King Manisarus (died c. 115 AD) was a 2nd-century king of the Corduene, which was a small vassal state during the Roman Empire. He has also been described as "perhaps prince of the Praetavi, whose capital was Singara". During his rule he took control over parts of Armenia and Mesopotamia, and Osroes I of Parthia declared war on him. Manisarus petitioned the Roman Emperor Trajan, offering him territory taken from supporters of Osroes in return for his support, an offer which was evidently accepted. Trajan also acquired the kingdom of Corduene at this time but only temporarily.

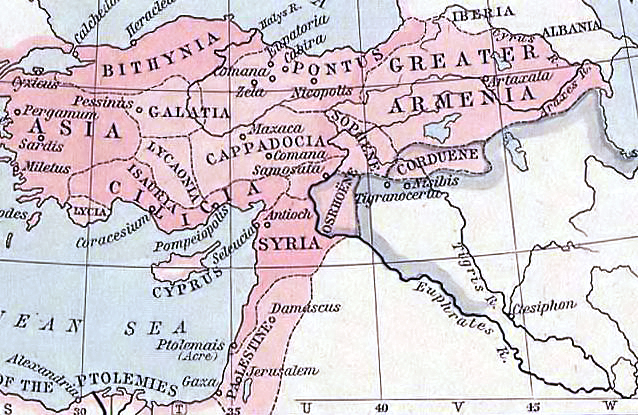
Map showing Corduene as it was in 63 BC
