= Atbaşı, Şırnak =

Village in Şırnak Province, Turkey

Atbaşı
- Village
- Location within Turkey
- Coordinates: 37.444°N 42.246°E
- Country: Turkey
- Province: Şırnak
- District: Şırnak
- Population (2021): 92
- Time zone: UTC+3 (TRT)

Atbaşı (Kurdish: Fêrisan) is a village in the central district of Şırnak Province in Turkey. The village is populated by Kurds of the Botikan tribe and had a population of 92 in 2021.

The village was depopulated in the 1990s during the Kurdish–Turkish conflict.
