= Kavuncu, Şırnak =

Village in Şırnak Province, Turkey

Kavuncu
- Village
- Location within Turkey
- Coordinates: 37.455°N 42.259°E
- Country: Turkey
- Province: Şırnak
- District: Şırnak
- Population (2021): 162
- Time zone: UTC+3 (TRT)

Kavuncu (Kurdish: Nanîp) is a village in the central district of Şırnak Province in Turkey. The village is populated by Kurds of the Botikan tribe and had a population of 162 in 2021.

The village was depopulated in the 1990s during the Kurdish–Turkish conflict.
