= Çardaklı, Silopi =

Village in Şırnak Province, Turkey

Çardaklı
- Village
- Location within Turkey
- Coordinates: 37.231°N 42.584°E
- Country: Turkey
- Province: Şırnak
- District: Silopi
- Population (2023): 1,830
- Time zone: UTC+3 (TRT)

Çardaklı (Kurdish: Kûlya) is a village in the Silopi District of Şırnak Province in Turkey. The village is populated by Kurds of the Sipêrtî tribe and had a population of 1,830 in 2023.

The hamlet of Tepelik is attached to Çardaklı.

== Population ==
Population history from 2007 to 2023:

Population
Year	Pop.	±%
2007	1,487	—
2010	1,593	+7.1%
2015	1,786	+12.1%
2020	1,858	+4.0%
2023	1,830	−1.5%
