= Carduchii =

Tribal people of Gordyene and the northern Zagros

The Carduchii or Karduchoi (Ancient Greek: Καρδοῦχοι) were a group of warlike tribes that inhabited an area stretching from the Botan River in the south to an area north of Cizre in present-day Turkey. Sometime after 401 BC, they expanded their authority into the northern Tigris valley. Between 165–95 BC, they established the independent kingdom of Gordyene, seemingly as a result of the power vacuum that took place following the weakening of the Greek Seleucid Empire (312 BC – 63 BC).

== Name and origins ==
The ethnolinguistic origin of the Carduchii is uncertain, though it seems they were of non-Armenian origin based on the accounts of the Greek historian Xenophon (died 354/55 BC) and classical writers such as Strabo (died 24 AD) and Plutarch (died after 119 AD). The Iranologist and Kurdologist Garnik Asatrian considers them to have been an indigenous pre Indo-European people inhabiting the area before Indo-Aryan migrations.

The origin of the name "Carduchii" is uncertain. Some historians have suggested that it is derived from the non Indo-European Urartian due to the suffix "-uchi" or similarity in consonants to the name of the Khaldi people. These two arguments have been criticized by historian Michał Marciak, who states that "The first apparent similarity misses the point linguistically, as it does not address the root of the ethnonym; and the second similarity does not actually appear to be very close." Other historians suggest that it is related to the Semitic Akkadian word qardu ("strong," "heroic").

== History ==
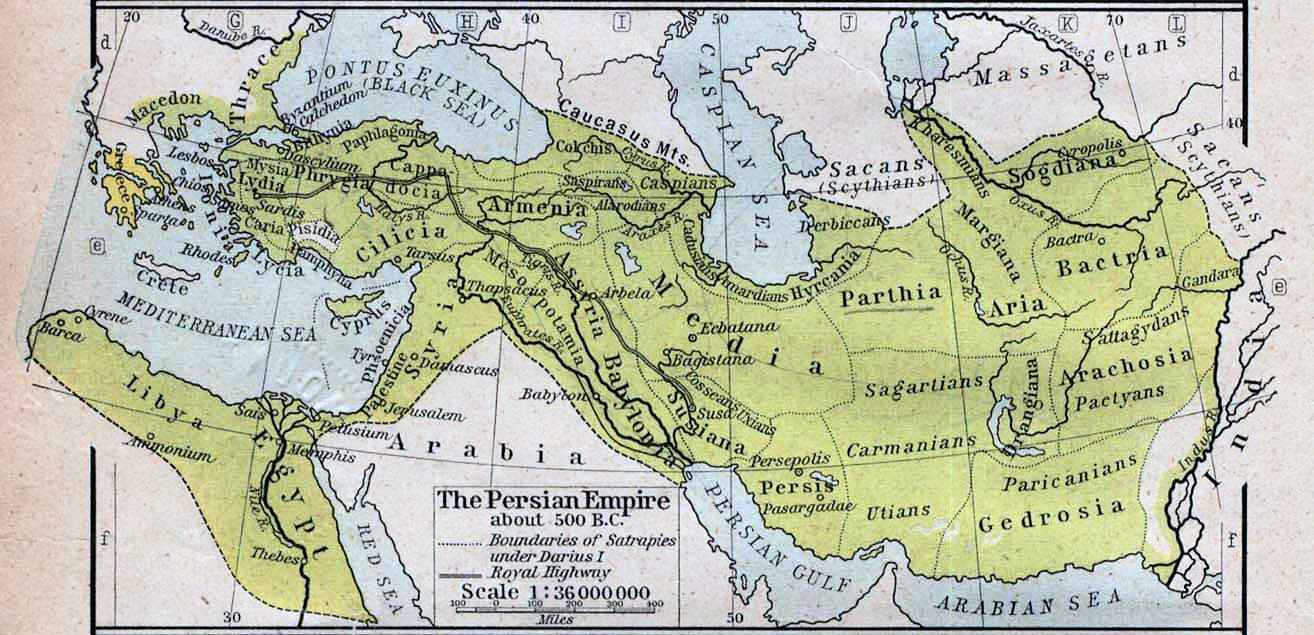
Map depicting the Achaemenid Empire in c. 500 BC, by William Robert Shepherd (1923)

The Carduchii were a group of warlike tribes that inhabited an area stretching from the Botan River in the south to an area north of the present-day Turkish city of Cizre. The territory they came to inhabit was situated halfway between the Assyrian and Armenian satrapies (provinces) of the Achaemenid Empire (550 BC – 330 BC). The Mesopotamian lowlands in the south and Armenia in the north were the two primary cultural influences on the region, with the former seemingly have a stronger impact. The area had most likely been incorporated into the Achaemenid Empire during the reign of its first ruler, Cyrus the Great (r. 550 – 530 BC).

The 4th-century BC historical book Anabasis by Xenophon is the first historical record to refer to the existence of the Carduchii. Their lands was part of the route that the Greek force known as the Ten Thousand marched through following the Battle of Cunaxa in 401 BC. Xenophon described the Carduchii as villagers who worked in agriculture, viticulture, craftsmanship, and animal husbandry.

Due to their lack of weapons, the Carduchii were unwilling to engage the Greeks directly. Instead, they resorted to guerrilla warfare, shooting arrows, throwing stones, and blocking drains against the Greeks. This strategy fit well with the terrain's features. Only small canyons and streamlets pierced the steeply forested mountain folds. Because of this, the Greeks could only approach rocky canyons and limited pathways. As a result, the Carduchii's blockade of these routes and occupation of higher land across the path posed a significant challenge for the Greeks.

The Carduchii later expanded their authority beyond the Botan river in the south, eventually gaining the possession of an area adjoining the northern part of the Tigris River and located between the Batman and Khabur rivers in southeast Anatolia. During the Hellenistic period, the Carduchii established the short lived independent kingdom of Gordyene between 165–95 BC, seemingly as a result of the power vacuum that took place following the weakening of the Greek Seleucid Empire (312 BC – 63 BC).

The Byzantine encyclopedia Suda also writes about them.

Although it was frequently argued in the past that the modern Kurds are the descendants of the Carduchii, it is far more likely that the Kurds descend from the Cyrtians, who appear in the works of Polybius, Livy, and Strabo. Historian John Limbert, writing in 1968, states that "older scholarship believed that the modern Kurds were direct descendants of the Kardukhoi" but that "this view has been widely disputed since the beginning of the twentieth century."

== Sources ==
- Asatrian, Garnik (2009). "Prolegomena to the Study of the Kurds". Iran and the Caucasus. 13 (1). Brill: 1–57. doi:10.1163/160984909X12476379007846. JSTOR 25597392. (registration required)
- Limbert, John (1968). "The Origins and Appearance of the Kurds in Pre-Islamic Iran". Iranian Studies. 13 (2). Cambridge University Press: 41–51. doi:10.1080/00210866808701350. JSTOR 4309997. (registration required)
- Dandamayev, Muhammad (1990). "Carduchi". In Yarshater, Ehsan (ed.). Encyclopædia Iranica. Vol. IV/7: Calendars II–Cappadocia. London and New York: Routledge & Kegan Paul. p. 806. ISBN 978-0-71009-130-7.
- Marciak, Michał (2017). Sophene, Gordyene, and Adiabene: Three Regna Minora of Northern Mesopotamia Between East and West. BRILL. ISBN 978-90-04-35072-4.
- Marciak, Michał (2021). "Gordyene". In Yarshater, Ehsan (ed.). Encyclopædia Iranica (Online ed.). Encyclopædia Iranica Foundation.
- Wiesehöfer, Josef (2006). "Carduchi". In Salazar, Christine F.; Landfester, Manfred; Gentry, Francis G. (eds.). Brill's New Pauly. Brill Online.
