= Kavaközü, Silopi =

Village in Şırnak Province, Turkey

Kavaközü
- Village
- Location within Turkey
- Coordinates: 37.220°N 42.346°E
- Country: Turkey
- Province: Şırnak
- District: Silopi
- Population (2023): 907
- Time zone: UTC+3 (TRT)

Kavaközü (Kurdish: Ribêyî) is a village in the Silopi District of Şırnak Province in Turkey. The village is populated by Kurds of the Tayan tribe and had a population of 907 in 2023.

== Population ==
Population history from 2007 to 2023:

Population
| Year | Pop. | ±% |
|---|---|---|
| 2007 | 658 | — |
| 2010 | 750 | +14.0% |
| 2015 | 1,133 | +51.1% |
| 2020 | 986 | −13.0% |
| 2023 | 907 | −8.0% |
