= Sareisa =

Ancient city in southeast Anatolia

Sareisa or Shareisha (Greek: Σάρεισά) was an ancient city in Upper Mesopotamia, near the Tigris. It is mentioned by Strabo as a city of Cordyene. Ancient Assyrian inscriptions mention it as 'Shareisha' or 'Shereshe'; Tiglath-Pileser I (c. 1100 BC) reports his conquest of the city and defeat of the forces of Kurte.
