= Kapılı, Silopi =

Village in Şırnak Province, Turkey

Kapılı
- Village
- Location within Turkey
- Coordinates: 37.164°N 42.579°E
- Country: Turkey
- Province: Şırnak
- District: Silopi
- Population (2023): 236
- Time zone: UTC+3 (TRT)

Kapılı (Kurdish: Kukît) is a village in the Silopi District of Şırnak Province in Turkey. The village is populated by Kurds of the Zewkan tribe and non-tribal affiliation and had a population of 236 in 2023.

The hamlet of Konaklı is attached to Kapılı.

== Population ==
Population history from 2007 to 2023:

Population
Year	Pop.	±%
2007	188	—
2010	223	+18.6%
2015	264	+18.4%
2020	223	−15.5%
2023	236	+5.8%
