= Kayaboyun, Şırnak =

Village in Şırnak Province, Turkey

Kayaboyun
- Village
- Location within Turkey
- Coordinates: 37.474°N 42.103°E
- Country: Turkey
- Province: Şırnak
- District: Şırnak
- Population (2021): 466
- Time zone: UTC+3 (TRT)

Kayaboyun (Kurdish: Şerefî) is a village in the central district of Şırnak Province in Turkey. The village is populated by Kurds of the Dêrşêwî tribe and had a population of 466 in 2021. The hamlet of Oruçlu is attached to Kayaboyun.

The village was depopulated in the 1990s during the Kurdish–Turkish conflict.
