= Dağkonak, Şırnak =

Village in Şırnak Province, Turkey

Dağkonak
- Village
- Location within Turkey
- Coordinates: 37.477°N 42.508°E
- Country: Turkey
- Province: Şırnak
- District: Şırnak
- Population (2021): 378
- Time zone: UTC+3 (TRT)

Dağkonak (Kurdish: Nerex) is a village in the central district of Şırnak Province in Turkey. The village is populated by Kurds of the Berwarî tribe and had a population of 378 in 2021.

The village was depopulated in the 1990s during the Kurdish–Turkish conflict.
