= Başak, Silopi =

Village in Şırnak Province, Turkey

Başak
- Village
- Location within Turkey
- Coordinates: 37.280°N 42.466°E
- Country: Turkey
- Province: Şırnak
- District: Silopi
- Population (2023): 6
- Time zone: UTC+3 (TRT)

Başak (Kurdish: Zêdga) is a village in the Silopi District of Şırnak Province in Turkey. The village is populated by Kurds of non-tribal affiliation and had a population of 6 in 2023.

== Population ==
Population history from 2020 to 2023:

Population
| Year | Pop. | ±% |
|---|---|---|
| 2020 | 2 | — |
| 2023 | 6 | +200.0% |
