= Yeniköy, Silopi =

Village in Şırnak Province, Turkey

Yeniköy
- Village
- Location within Turkey
- Coordinates: 37.270°N 42.424°E
- Country: Turkey
- Province: Şırnak
- District: Silopi
- Population (2023): 1,133
- Time zone: UTC+3 (TRT)

Yeniköy (Kurdish: Xirabreşik) is a village in the Silopi District of Şırnak Province in Turkey. The village is populated by Kurds of the Zewkan tribe and had a population of 1,133 in 2023.

The hamlets of Çukurca (Kurtik) and Uğurlu are attached to Yeniköy.

== Population ==
Population history from 2007 to 2023:

Population
Year	Pop.	±%
2007	1,362	—
2010	1,463	+7.4%
2015	893	−39.0%
2020	1,067	+19.5%
2023	1,133	+6.2%
