= Görümlü, Silopi =

Town in Şırnak Province, Turkey

Görümlü
- Municipality
- Location in Turkey
- Coordinates: 37.334°N 42.571°E
- Country: Turkey
- Province: Şırnak
- District: Silopi
- Population (2023): 5,187
- Time zone: UTC+3 (TRT)

Görümlü (Kurdish: Bêspin, Syriac: Bespīn) (Note: Alternatively transliterated as Baspin, Besbin, Besbine, Betspen, or Bespen.) is a municipality (belde) in the Silopi District of Şırnak Province in Turkey. It is populated by Kurds of the Girkê Emo tribe and had a population of 5,187 in 2023.

The neighbourhoods of Görümlü are Boğaz, Yeni Mahalle and Yolağızı.

== History ==
Bespīn (today called Görümlü) was historically inhabited by Chaldean Catholic Assyrians. According to the list presented to the Paris Peace Conference by the Assyro-Chaldean delegation, the village was inhabited by 200 Assyrians in 1914. A church that had been built just prior to the First World War was confiscated in 1915 as it was too close to a Muslim cemetery. Amidst the Sayfo, Bespīn was destroyed by Bohtan Kurds. After 1980, 500 of the 544 Assyrians at Bespīn were forced to emigrate and abandon their property due to the Kurdish–Turkish conflict.

== Population ==
Population history from 2007 to 2023:

Population
Year	Pop.	±%
2007	3,113	—
2010	3,290	+5.7%
2015	4,149	+26.1%
2020	4,986	+20.2%
2023	5,187	+4.0%

== Bibliography ==
- Baz, Ibrahim (2016). Şırnak aşiretleri ve kültürü (in Turkish). p. 151. ISBN 9786058849631.
- Gaunt, David (2006). Massacres, Resistance, Protectors: Muslim-Christian Relations in Eastern Anatolia during World War I. Gorgias Press.
- Jongerden, Joost; Verheij, Jelle (2012). Social Relations in Ottoman Diyarbekir, 1870-1915. Brill.
- Wilmshurst, David (2000). The Ecclesiastical Organisation of the Church of the East, 1318–1913. Peeters Publishers.
- Yacoub, Joseph (2016). Year of the Sword: The Assyrian Christian Genocide, A History. Translated by James Ferguson. Oxford University Press.
