= Çalışkan, Silopi =

Town in Şırnak Province, Turkey

Çalışkan
- Municipality

- Location within Turkey
- Coordinates: 37.297°N 42.642°E
- Country: Turkey
- Province: Şırnak
- District: Silopi
- Population (2023): 5,180
- Time zone: UTC+3 (TRT)

Çalışkan (Kurdish: Gitê) is a belde in the Silopi District of Şırnak Province in Turkey. It is populated by Kurds of non-tribal affiliation and had a population of 5,180 in 2023.

The neighborhoods of Çalışkan are Atatürk, Cumhuriyet, Fatih and Vatan.

== Population ==
Population history from 2007 to 2023:

Population
Year	Pop.	±%
2007	3,356	—
2010	3,481	+3.7%
2015	4,538	+30.4%
2020	4,744	+4.5%
2023	5,180	+9.2%
