= Başağaç, Şırnak =

Village in Şırnak Province, Turkey

Başağaç
- Village
- Location within Turkey
- Coordinates: 37.544°N 42.372°E
- Country: Turkey
- Province: Şırnak
- District: Şırnak
- Population (2021): 494
- Time zone: UTC+3 (TRT)

Başağaç (Kurdish: Medikeyan) is a village in the central district of Şırnak Province in Turkey. The village is populated by Kurds of the Botikan tribe and had a population of 494 in 2021. The two hamlets of Kalaba and Mendik are attached to Başağaç.

The village was depopulated in the 1990s during the Kurdish–Turkish conflict.
