= Balveren, Şırnak =

Village in Şırnak Province, Turkey

Balveren
- Municipality
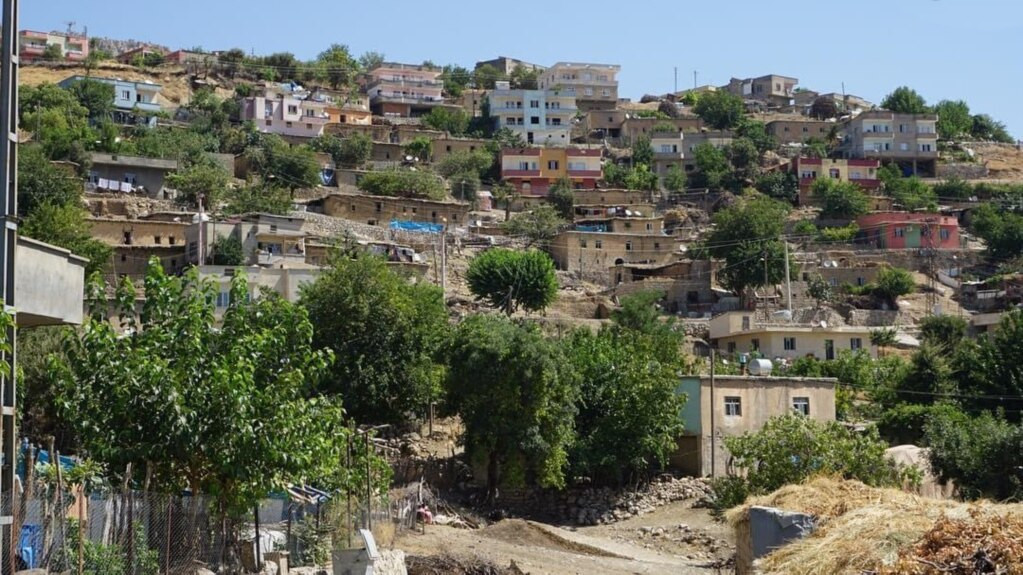

- Location within Turkey
- Coordinates: 37.484°N 42.549°E
- Country: Turkey
- Province: Şırnak
- District: Şırnak
- Population (2023): 3,871
- Time zone: UTC+3 (TRT)

Balveren (Kurdish: Melê) is a town (belde) in the central district of Şırnak Province in Turkey. It is populated by Kurds of the Berwarî tribe and had a population of 3,871 in 2023.

== Population ==
Population history of the village from 1965 to 2023:

Population
Year	Pop.	±%
1965	1,063	—
1980	1,595	+50.0%
1990	2,563	+60.7%
2000	3,796	+48.1%
2010	3,156	−16.9%
2020	3,534	+12.0%
2023	3,871	+9.5%
