= Cyrtians =

Tribe in historic Persia near Mount Zagros

The Cyrtians or Kyrtians (Ancient Greek: Κύρτιοι, romanized: Kýrtioi, Latin: Cyrtii) were an ancient tribe in historic Iran near the Zagros Mountains. Based on their name, it has been suggested that they may be ancestors of the Kurds or the source of the ethnonym Kurd.

According to Rüdiger Schmitt, they were a tribe dwelling mainly in the mountains of Atropatenian Media (Northern Zagros Mountains) together with the Cadusii, Amardi (or "Mardi"), Tapyri, and others (Strabo 11.13.3). Strabo characterized the Cyrtians living in Persia as migrants and predatory brigands.

In the Hellenistic period, they seem to have been in demand as slingers, because they fought as such for the Median satrap Molon in his revolt against King Antiochus III in 220 BC.

Friedrich Carl Andreas was the first scholar to propose a connection between the names Cyrtian and Kurd. He placed the ethnic territory of the Cyrtians in the area of the Armenian province of Korchayk, the name of which he derived from the hypothetical form *korti-ayk‘, with the first element developing from *kurti to *korti- to *korč-.

== Origins ==
According to Garnik Asatrian, Cyrtians were a collection of indigenous, non-Iranian tribes who only shared a nomadic lifestyle. The Cyrtians were not connected to the Carduchii (Cordyaei, Gordyaei, Karduchoi) and the like, who lived further west.

== Sources ==
- Asatrian, Garnik (2009). "Prolegomena to the Study of the Kurds". Iran & the Caucasus. 13 (1): 1–58. ISSN 1609-8498.
- Brentjes, B. (2006). "Cyrtii". Brill's New Pauly Online. Brill. doi:10.1163/1574-9347_bnp_e627070.
- Potts, Daniel T. (2014). Nomadism in Iran: From Antiquity to the Modern Era. London and New York: Oxford University Press. ISBN 978-0190600594.
- Schmitt, Rüdiger (1993). "Cyrtians". In Yarshater, Ehsan (ed.). Encyclopædia Iranica. Vol. VI/5: Čūb-bāzī–Daf(f) and Dāyera. London and New York: Routledge & Kegan Paul. p. 515. ISBN 978-1-56859-003-5.
