= Kumçatı, Şırnak =

Village in Şırnak Province, Turkey

Kumçatı
- Municipality
- Location in Turkey
- Coordinates: 37.471°N 42.317°E
- Country: Turkey
- Province: Şırnak
- District: Şırnak
- Population (2023): 9,874
- Time zone: UTC+3 (TRT)

Kumçatı (Kurdish: Dergul) is a town (belde) in the central district of Şırnak Province in Turkey. It is populated by Kurds of the Botikan tribe and had a population of 9,874 in 2023.

== Population ==
Population history of the village from 1965 to 2023:

Population
Year	Pop.	±%
1965	518	—
1980	792	+52.9%
1990	2,223	+180.7%
2000	5,005	+125.1%
2010	7,097	+41.8%
2020	9,856	+38.9%
2023	9,874	+0.2%
