= Toptepe, Şırnak =

Village in Şırnak Province, Turkey

Toptepe
- Village
- Location within Turkey
- Coordinates: 37.468°N 42.391°E
- Country: Turkey
- Province: Şırnak
- District: Şırnak
- Population (2021): 1,219
- Time zone: UTC+3 (TRT)

Toptepe (Kurdish: Avka Meziyan) is a village in the central district of Şırnak Province in Turkey. The village is populated by Kurds of the Botikan tribe and had a population of 1,219 in 2021. The hamlets of Çobanbey and Çukurhan are attached to Toptepe.

The village was depopulated in the 1990s during the Kurdish–Turkish conflict.
