= Kasrik, Şırnak =

Village in Şırnak Province, Turkey

Kasrik
- Municipality
- Location in Turkey
- Coordinates: 37.401°N 42.180°E
- Country: Turkey
- Province: Şırnak
- District: Şırnak
- Population (2023): 3,391
- Time zone: UTC+3 (TRT)

Kasrik (Kurdish: Kasrik) is a belde in the central district of Şırnak Province in Turkey. It is populated by Kurds of the Botikan tribe and had a population of 3,391 in 2023.

== Population ==
Population history from 2007 to 2023:

Population
| Year | Pop. | ±% |
|---|---|---|
| 2007 | 2,796 | — |
| 2010 | 2,751 | −1.6% |
| 2015 | 2,798 | +1.7% |
| 2020 | 3,313 | +18.4% |
| 2023 | 3,391 | +2.4% |
