= Başverimli, Silopi =

Town in Şırnak Province, Turkey

Başverimli
- Municipality
- Başverimli Municipality Building

- Location within Turkey
- Coordinates: 37.204°N 42.536°E
- Country: Turkey
- Province: Şırnak
- District: Silopi
- Population (2023): 7,903
- Time zone: UTC+3 (TRT)

Başverimli (Kurdish: Wehsid) is a municipality (belde) in the Silopi District of Şırnak Province in Turkey. It is populated by Kurds of the Zewkan tribe and had a population of 7,903 in 2023.

The municipality is divided into the neighborhoods of Cumhuriyet and Köprübaşı (Tilqebîn).

== Population ==
Population history from 2007 to 2023:

Population
Year	Pop.	±%
2007	4,217	—
2010	4,235	+0.4%
2015	5,768	+36.2%
2020	6,896	+19.6%
2023	7,903	+14.6%
