= Şırnak =

- Municipality
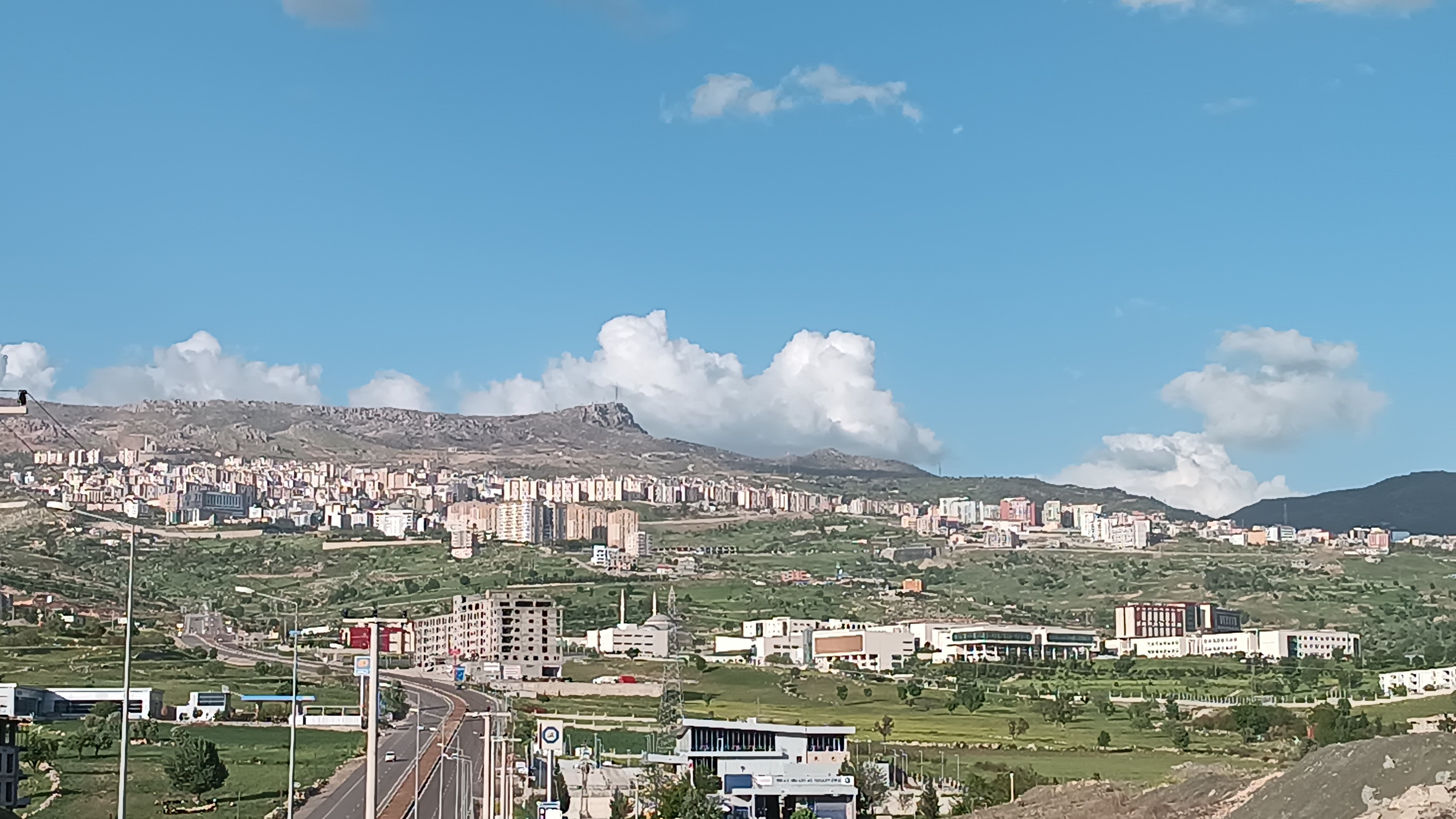

- Coat of arms

- Location within Turkey
- Coordinates: 37.520°N 42.459°E
- Country: Turkey
- Province: Şırnak
- District: Şırnak

Government
  - Mayor: Mehmet Yarka (AKP)
- Population (2023): 75,932
- Time zone: UTC+3 (TRT)
- Website: www.sirnak.bel.tr

Şırnak (Kurdish: Şirnex) is a city in Şırnak District and the capital of Şırnak Province in Turkey. The city is located near the Ibrahim Khalil border crossing with Iraq, which is one of the main links from Turkey to the Kurdistan Region of Iraq. The city is mainly populated by Kurds of the Şirnexî tribe and had a population of 75,932 in 2023. It is considered part of Turkish Kurdistan.

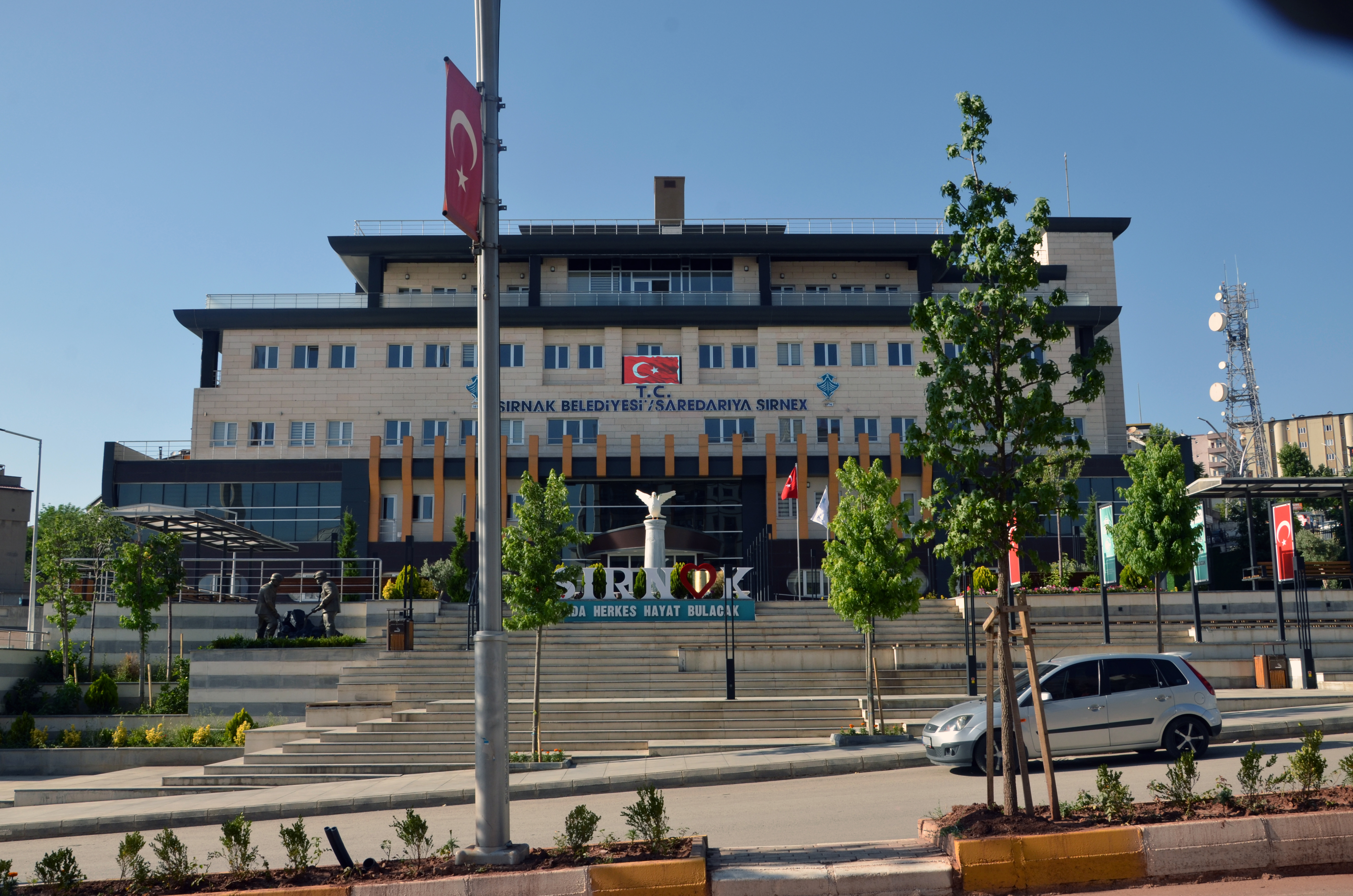
Şırnak Municipality Building

== History ==
In the 9th century AD, during the weakening of the Abbasid Caliphate, several Kurdish emirates were formed. One of which was the Marwanid dynasty, which encompassed the city of Şırnak.

=== Kurdish-Turkish conflict ===
==== 1992 Turkish military operation ====
On 18 August 1992, fighting broke out between Turkish forces and Kurdish separatists of the PKK. 20,000 out of 25,000 residents fled the city during the three days of fighting.

While the town was under bombardment, there was no way to get an account of what was happening in the region as journalists were prevented from entering the city centre, which was completely burned down by the Turkish Armed Forces. Şırnak was under fire for consecutive three days, with tanks and cannons shelling buildings inhabited by civilians.

==== 2014–2016 conflict ====
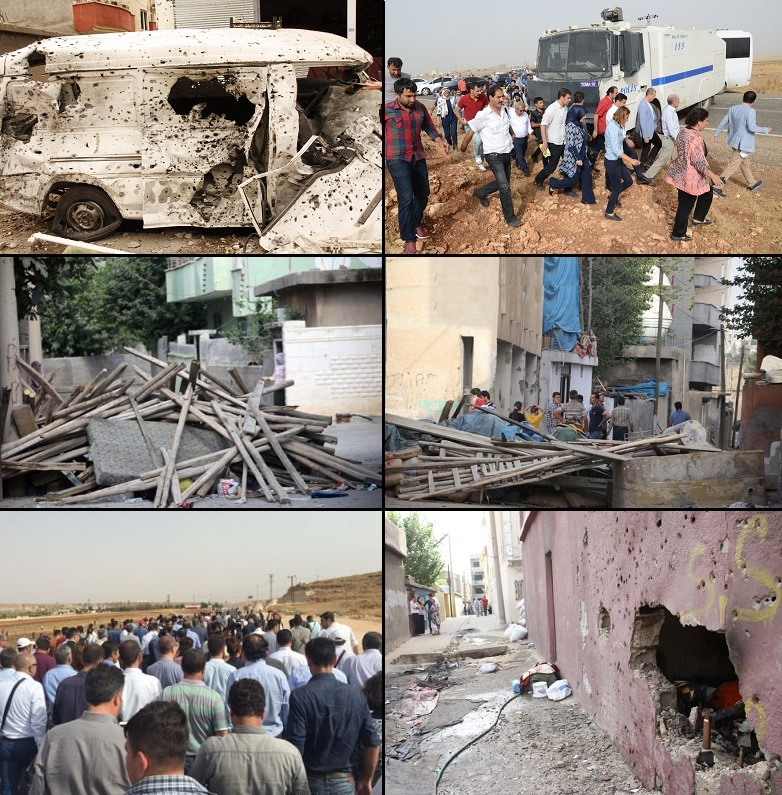
Şırnak during the 2014–2016 conflict.

In the late summer and fall of 2015, following the 2014 Kobanî protests and breakdown of the 2013–2015 PKK–Turkey peace process, which were part of the broader third phase of the Kurdish–Turkish conflict, local Kurdish youth and activists, with some of them being affiliated with the Patriotic Revolutionary Youth Movement (YDG-H), and later YPS, organized popular protests, riots, and declared "self-management" in the city of Şırnak. On 13 March 2016 military operations by Turkish forces began in the city against supposed "PKK militants." The military curfew imposed on the city was lifted after 246 days. Neighborhoods such as Gazipaşa, Yeşilyurt, İsmetpaşa, Dicle, Cumhuriyet, and Bahçelievler were completely destroyed during the fighting, with allegations of systematic destruction and human rights violations committed by Turkish security forces. Mehmet Ali Aslan, a lawmaker from the pro-Kurdish Peoples' Democratic Party (HDP), stated that around 50,000 people were left homeless in Şırnak and that “no residential areas remained” following the military operation. He told an investigatory committee that the destruction in Şırnak resembled scenes from Aleppo or cities in the West Bank after visiting the city.

== Neighborhoods ==
Şırnak is divided into the twelve neighborhoods of Aşağıhan, Atatürk, Aydınlar, Bahçelievler, Boğaz, Cadırlı, Çavuşhan, Hatipler, Nasırhan, Şafak, Yayla and Yeni.

== Politics ==
In local elections of 2019, candidate Mehmet Yarka of the AKP party won with 61.72% of the vote.

== Population and demographics ==
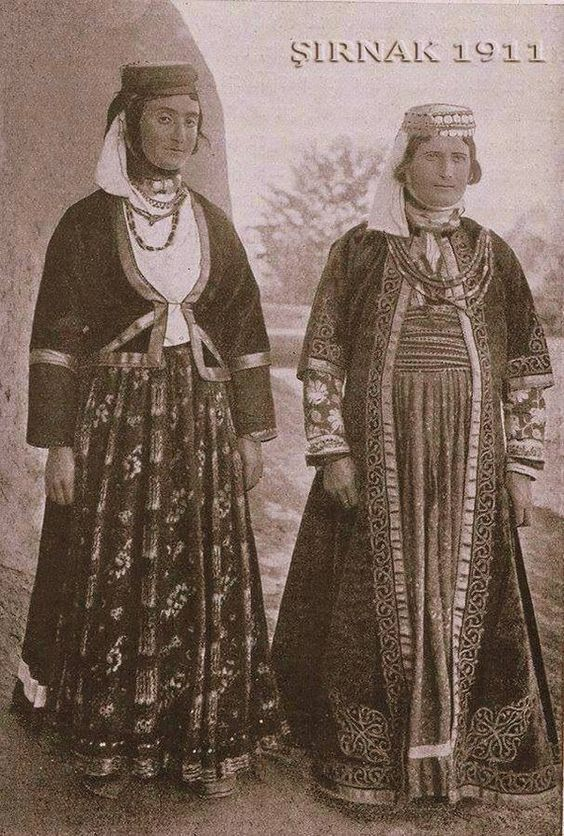
Kurdish women in traditional dress in Şırnak in 1911

Population history from 1965 to 2023:

Population
Year	Pop.	±%
1965	4,936	—
1980	10,997	+122.8%
1990	25,059	+127.9%
2000	52,743	+110.5%
2010	54,263	+2.9%
2023	75,932	+39.9%

Among the Kurdish regions of Turkey, Şırnak is projected to experience one of the highest population growth rates.

In 2013 the unemployment rate reached 20.1% in the city, indicating the economic and social handicapping of Kurdish regions by the Turkish state.

== Climate ==
Şırnak National Garden

Şırnak has a hot-summer Mediterranean climate (Köppen: Csa), with chilly, snowy winters and very hot, dry summers. Humidity is always low throughout the year due to its inland location. February and March are the wettest months, July and August are the driest, with virtually no precipitation at all.

Highest recorded temperature:40.4 °C (104.7 °F) on 28 July 2011 and 10 August 2023; New record high temperature 42.3 °C (108.1 °F) on 25 July 2025.

Lowest recorded temperature:−14.5 °C (5.9 °F) on 2 January 2009.

Climate data for Şırnak (1991–2020, extremes 1970–2023)
Month	Jan	Feb	Mar	Apr	May	Jun	Jul	Aug	Sep	Oct	Nov	Dec	Year
Record high °C (°F)	18.1 (64.6)	18.2 (64.8)	24.8 (76.6)	29.0 (84.2)	34.1 (93.4)	38.2 (100.8)	42.3 (108.1)	40.4 (104.7)	38.6 (101.5)	32.1 (89.8)	23.0 (73.4)	22.5 (72.5)	42.3 (108.1)
Mean daily maximum °C (°F)	5.9 (42.6)	7.4 (45.3)	12.0 (53.6)	16.7 (62.1)	23.0 (73.4)	30.1 (86.2)	34.2 (93.6)	34.0 (93.2)	29.4 (84.9)	22.0 (71.6)	13.5 (56.3)	8.4 (47.1)	19.7 (67.5)
Daily mean °C (°F)	2.6 (36.7)	3.8 (38.8)	8.1 (46.6)	12.5 (54.5)	18.7 (65.7)	25.3 (77.5)	29.5 (85.1)	29.3 (84.7)	24.7 (76.5)	17.8 (64.0)	9.9 (49.8)	5.1 (41.2)	15.6 (60.1)
Mean daily minimum °C (°F)	−0.4 (31.3)	0.5 (32.9)	4.2 (39.6)	8.2 (46.8)	13.9 (57.0)	20.1 (68.2)	24.3 (75.7)	24.1 (75.4)	19.7 (67.5)	13.3 (55.9)	6.0 (42.8)	1.7 (35.1)	11.3 (52.3)
Record low °C (°F)	−14.5 (5.9)	−13.2 (8.2)	−11.2 (11.8)	−4.7 (23.5)	0.8 (33.4)	9.2 (48.6)	13.1 (55.6)	15.0 (59.0)	3.2 (37.8)	−0.5 (31.1)	−5.0 (23.0)	−10.8 (12.6)	−14.5 (5.9)
Average precipitation mm (inches)	107.3 (4.22)	103.8 (4.09)	125.8 (4.95)	115.1 (4.53)	52.6 (2.07)	5.3 (0.21)	6.1 (0.24)	0.7 (0.03)	13.2 (0.52)	54.6 (2.15)	82.5 (3.25)	101.2 (3.98)	768.2 (30.24)
Average precipitation days	11.29	11.29	12.81	12.05	8	2.05	0.81	0.48	1.24	6.86	7.95	11.57	86.4
Average snowy days	6.7	4.1	3	0.3	0	0	0	0	0	0	0	1.4	15.5
Mean monthly sunshine hours	96.1	121.5	170.5	216.0	263.5	318.0	347.2	328.6	303.0	220.1	150.0	99.2	2,633.7
Mean daily sunshine hours	3.1	4.3	5.5	7.2	8.5	10.6	11.2	10.6	10.1	7.1	5.0	3.2	7.2
Source 1: Turkish State Meteorological Service
Source 2: Meteomanz (snow days 2017–2023)
