= Chaldean Catholic Eparchy of Duhok =

Iraqi diocese of the Chaldean Church

Eparchy of Amadiyah and Zakho
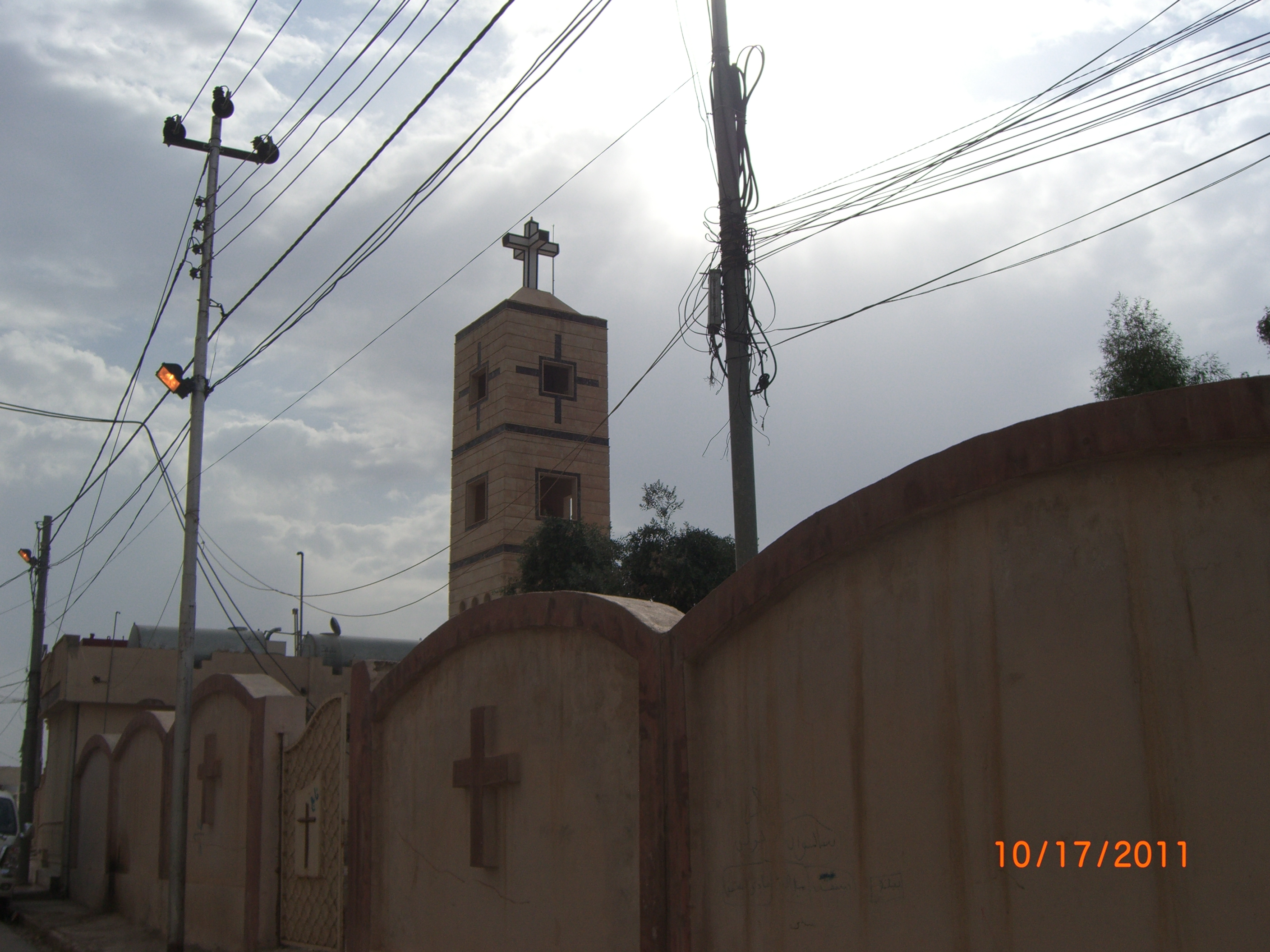
- St. George Cathedral in Zakho

Location
- Country: Iraq
- Metropolitan: Patriarchate of Baghdad

Statistics
- Population: Total: (as of 2013); 3,500

Information
- Denomination: Chaldean Catholic
- Rite: East Syriac Rite
- Established: June 10, 2013 (Merger of the Diocese of Amadiyah and the Diocese of Zakho) June 27, 2020 The Diocese of Dohuk was separated from the Diocese of Zakho and confirmed by Pope Francis.

Current leadership
- Pope: Leo XIV
- Bishop: Mgr Rabban al Qas

Chaldean Catholic Diocese of Zakho is a diocese of the Chaldean Church in the second half of the 19th century and for most of the 20th century. The diocese of Zakho was merged with the Chaldean diocese of ʿAmadiya in 1987. In December 2001, a new bishop was consecrated. In July 2013, Zakho was suppressed to the Diocese of Amadiyah.

== Background ==
The diocese of Zakho was founded in 1851. The diocese included some villages in the western Khabur valley and the mountains to the northeast of Zakho previously in the diocese of Gazarta, and several villages in the Dohuk district previously in the diocese of ʿAmadiya.

== The Chaldean bishops of Zakho ==
The first Chaldean bishop of Zakho was Emmanuel Asmar (1859–75).

He was succeeded by Quriaqos Giwargis Goga, a monk of the monastery of Rabban Hormizd, who was born in Telkepe on 15 January 1820 and ordained a priest in 1855. According to Tfinkdji he was consecrated for Zakho on 25 July 1875 by the patriarch Joseph VI Audo, but a manuscript note gives the date of his consecration as 1 August 1875. In 1876 Quriaqos Giwargis Goga rebelled against the patriarch and installed himself in the village of Telkepe in the patriarchal diocese of Mosul, where he was supported by most of the village's priests. Following an appeal to the Vatican by Joseph Audo, the two rebels eventually submitted, and Goga was transferred to the diocese of ʿAmadiya in 1879.

Quriaqos Goga was succeeded by Mattai Paul Shamina (1879–85) and Stephen Yohannan Qaynaya (1886–9).

Jeremy Timothy Maqdassi, who was born in Alqosh in 1847 and became a priest in 1879, was consecrated bishop of Zakho either in 1890 (De Clerq) or 1892 (Fiey), and remained its bishop until his death in 1929. He was succeeded by Peter Raffo ʿAziz (1929–37), Yohannan Nisan (1937–57), Thomas Rayyis (1957–66) and Gabriel Qoda (27 November 1965– 7 March 1968).

Gabriel Qoda, who died in March 1993, was succeeded as bishop of Zakho on 7 March 1968 by Joseph Babana. Joseph Babana died on 9 September 1973 at the age of 57, and was succeeded on 13 October 1973 by Yohannan Paulus Marcus.

The elderly Yohannan Paulus Marcus, who died on 13 July 1985 at the age of 75, was succeeded as bishop of Zakho by Stephen Kajo on 29 November 1983.

Following the death of Stephen Kajo on 8 November 1987, the diocese of Zakho remained vacant for fourteen years. During this period the few remaining Chaldeans in the Zakho district remained under the care of Yohannan Qello, the bishop of ʿAmadiya.

In December 2001 Petros Hanna Issa Al-Harboli was consecrated bishop of Zakho. After brief illness he died on November 3, 2010.

In July 2013, the Chaldean diocese of Amadiya was united with Zakho under Rabban al-Qas.

In June 2020, the Chaldean Patriarch Louis Raphael I Sako, dissolved the union in agreement with the Synod of the Chaldean Catholic Church and re-established the Diocese of Amadiyah as an independent diocese under the name Diocese of Dohuk, with its former bishop, Rabban al-Qas, as its new bishop. The Synod elected the former Auxiliary Bishop Felix Dawood Al Shabi as the new bishop of the Diocese of Zakho. Pope Francis confirmed the division of the dioceses and the episcopal appointment on June 27, 2020.

== Population statistics ==
In 1867 the diocese of Zakho had a population of 3,000 Chaldeans and contained 15 villages (Martin).

In 1896 the diocese had a population of 3,500 Chaldeans, and contained 15 parishes and 20 churches (Chabot). The largest villages in the diocese were Zakho, Dohuk, Sharanesh, Yarda, Beidar, Bir Sivi, Mar Yaʿqob and Esnakh, and the bishop resided either at Zakho or Dohuk. The diocese then had ten indigenous priests and 5 priests who had been trained at the monastery of Rabban Hormizd.

In 1913 the diocese contained 15 villages and 17 churches and had a population of 4,880 Chaldeans, served by 13 priests.

Chaldean communities in the diocese of Zakho, 1913

| Name of Village | Name in Syriac | Number of Believers | Number of Priests | Number of Churches | Name of Village | Name in Syriac | Number of Believers | Number of Priests | Number of Churches |
| Zakho | ܙܵܟ݂ܘܿ | 50 | 1 | 1 | Marga | | 760 | 1 | 1 |
| Beidar | | 400 | 1 | 1 | Bellon | | 300 | 1 | 1 |
| Berseve | ܒܝܪܣܦ̮ܐ | 400 | 1 | 1 | Esnakh | | 600 | 1 | 1 |
| Sharanesh | ܫܪܢܘܫ | 600 | 1 | 2 | Dohuk | ܒܝܬ ܢܘܗܕܪܐ | 350 | 2 | 1 |
| Alanesh | ܐܠܢܝܫ | 70 | 1 | 1 | Shiyos | | 210 | 1 | 1 |
| Yarda | | 250 | 1 | 2 | Qashafir | | 150 | 0 | 0 |
| Umra (Deir Shish) | ܥܘܡܪܐ | 200 | 0 | 1 | Garmawa | | 40 | 0 | 1 |
| Baijo | | 500 | 1 | 2 | Total | | 4,880 | 13 | 17 |

A large number of Assyrian refugees settled in the Zakho district after the First World War, and their presence is reflected in later statistics for the diocese. In 1928, according to an official statistic prepared by the Congregation for the Oriental Churches, the diocese of Zakho included 16 villages and contained 8,000 Chaldeans and 18 churches. In 1937 the diocese included 23 villages, and contained 10,852 Chaldeans, 18 priests, and 16 churches (Kajo).
