= Uludere Dam =

- Location within Turkey
- Country: Turkey
- Location: İnceler, Uludere District, Şırnak Province
- Coordinates: 37°25′33″N 42°48′8″E
- Purpose: Water supply, military
- Status: Under construction
- Construction began: 2008
- Construction cost: US$65,920,000 (TL103,000,000) (Combined cost with Balli Dam)
- Owner: State Hydraulic Works

Dam and spillways
- Type of dam: Gravity, roller-compacted concrete
- Impounds: Ortasu River
- Height: 55.5 m (182 ft)
- Length: 431 m (1,414 ft)
- Elevation at crest: 913 m (2,995 ft)
- Width (crest): 8 m (26 ft)
- Dam volume: 35,000 m^{3} (45,778 cu yd)
- Spillway type: Overflow

Reservoir
- Total capacity: 20,100,000 m^{3} (16,295 acre⋅ft)
- Catchment area: 196.4 km^{2} (76 mi^{2})
- Normal elevation: 908.49 m (2,981 ft)

Power Station
- Turbines: 2 (planned)
- Installed capacity: 3.5 MW (planned)

The Uludere Dam is a gravity dam under construction on the Ortasu River (a tributary of the Hezil River) near İnceler in Uludere District of Şırnak Province, southeast Turkey. Under contract from Turkey's State Hydraulic Works, Hidrokon began construction on the dam in 2008 and a completion date has not been announced.

The reported purpose of the dam is water storage and it can also support a 3.5 MW hydroelectric power station in the future. Another purpose of the dam which has been widely reported in the Turkish press is to reduce the freedom of movement of Kurdistan Workers' Party (PKK) militants. Blocking and flooding valleys in close proximity to the Iraq–Turkey border is expected to help curb cross-border PKK smuggling and deny caves in which ammunition can be stored. A total of 11 dams along the border; seven in Şırnak Province and four in Hakkâri Province were implemented for this purpose. In Şırnak they are the Silopi and Şırnak Dams downstream of the Uludere Dam and the Balli, Kavşaktepe, Musatepe and Çetintepe Dams upstream on the Ortasu River. In Hakkari are the Gölgeliyamaç (since cancelled) and Çocuktepe Dams on the Güzeldere River and the Aslandağ and Beyyurdu Dams on the Bembo River.

Construction works were estimated 14% complete in July 2015. Uludere Dam was still under construction as of April 2019.

== See also ==
- List of dams and reservoirs in Turkey
