= Balli Dam =

- Location within Turkey
- Country: Turkey
- Location: Uludere, Şırnak Province
- Coordinates: 37°24′24.99″N 42°49′56.75″E
- Purpose: Water supply, military
- Status: Under construction
- Construction began: 2008
- Construction cost: US$65,920,000 (TL103,000,000) (Combined cost with Uludere Dam)
- Owner: State Hydraulic Works

Dam and spillways
- Type of dam: Gravity, roller-compacted concrete
- Impounds: Ortasu River
- Height: 49 m (161 ft)
- Elevation at crest: 960 m (3,150 ft)
- Width (crest): 8 m (26 ft)
- Dam volume: 99,451 m^{3} (130,077 cu yd)
- Spillway type: Overflow

Reservoir
- Inactive capacity: 7,090,000 m^{3} (5,748 acre⋅ft)
- Catchment area: 177 km^{2} (68 mi^{2})
- Normal elevation: 958 m (3,143 ft)

Power Station
- Installed capacity: 8.36 MW (max. planned)

The Balli Dam is a gravity dam under construction on the Ortasu River (a tributary of the Hezil River) in Uludere district of Şırnak Province, southeast Turkey. Under contract from Turkey's State Hydraulic Works, construction on the dam began in 2008 and a completion date has not been announced.

The reported purpose of the dam is water storage and it can also support an 8.36 MW hydroelectric power station in the future. Another purpose of the dam which has been widely reported in the Turkish press is to reduce the freedom of movement of Kurdistan Workers' Party (PKK) militants. Blocking and flooding valleys near the Iraq–Turkey border is expected to help curb cross-border PKK smuggling and deny caves in which ammunition can be stored. A total of 11 dams along the border; seven in Şırnak Province and four in Hakkâri Province were implemented for this purpose. In Şırnak they are the Silopi, Şırnak and Uludere Dams downstream of the Balli Dam and the Kavşaktepe, Musatepe and Çetintepe Dams upstream on the Ortasu River. In Hakkari are the Gölgeliyamaç (since cancelled) and Çocuktepe Dams on the Güzeldere River and the Aslandağ and Beyyurdu Dams on the Bembo River.

Balli dam was still under construction as of March 2019, with construction works 95% complete at that time.

== See also ==
- List of dams and reservoirs in Turkey
