= Çetintepe Dam =

- Location within Turkey
- Country: Turkey
- Location: Uludere, Şırnak Province
- Coordinates: 37°22′10.39″N 42°56′19.38″E
- Purpose: Water supply, military
- Status: Operational
- Construction began: 2008
- Opening date: 2023
- Construction cost: US$24,640,000 (TL38,500,000) (Combined cost with Musatepe Dam)
- Owner: State Hydraulic Works

Dam and spillways
- Type of dam: Gravity, roller-compacted concrete
- Impounds: Ortasu River
- Height: 60.5 m (198 ft)
- Height (thalweg): 116 m
- Length: 174 m (571 ft)
- Elevation at crest: 1,161 m (3,809 ft)
- Width (crest): 8 m (26 ft)
- Dam volume: 130,500 m^{3} (170,688 cu yd)
- Spillway type: Overflow

Reservoir
- Total capacity: 44,330,000 m^{3} (35,939 acre⋅ft)
- Catchment area: 125.5 km^{2} (48 mi^{2})
- Surface area: 1.40 km^{2} (1 mi^{2})
- Normal elevation: 1,155 m (3,789 ft)

Power Station
- Installed capacity: 2 MW (planned)

The Çetintepe Dam is a gravity dam under construction on the Ortasu River (a tributary of the Hezil River) in Uludere district of Şırnak Province, southeast Turkey. Under contract from Turkey's State Hydraulic Works, Ozerka Insatt began construction on the dam in 2008 and a completion date has not been announced.

The reported purpose of the dam is water storage and it can also support a 2 MW hydroelectric power station in the future. Another purpose of the dam which has been widely reported in the Turkish press is to reduce the freedom of movement of Kurdistan Workers' Party (PKK) militants. Blocking and flooding valleys close to the Iraq–Turkey border is expected to help curb cross-border PKK smuggling and deny caves in which ammunition can be stored. A total of 11 dams along the border; seven in Şırnak Province and four in Hakkâri Province were implemented for this purpose. In Şırnak they are the Silopi, Şırnak, Uludere, Balli, Kavşaktepe and Musatepe Dams downstream of the Çetintepe Dam. In Hakkari are the Gölgeliyamaç (since cancelled) and Çocuktepe Dams on the Güzeldere River and the Aslandağ and Beyyurdu Dams on the Bembo River.

Çetintepe Dam was still under construction as of July 2019, with construction works 68% complete at that time.

According to the 10th Regional Directorate of State Hydraulic Works (DSI), the construction of the dam was completed in 2023.

== See also ==
- List of dams and reservoirs in Turkey
