= Kavşaktepe Dam =

- Location within Turkey
- Country: Turkey
- Location: Uludere, Şırnak Province
- Coordinates: 37°23′36.77″N 42°52′07.58″E
- Purpose: Water supply, military
- Status: Under construction
- Construction began: 2008
- Construction cost: US$43,840,000 (TL68,500,000)
- Owner: State Hydraulic Works

Dam and spillways
- Type of dam: Gravity, roller-compacted concrete
- Impounds: Ortasu River
- Height: 66 m (217 ft)
- Length: 268 m (879 ft)
- Elevation at crest: 1,060 m (3,478 ft)
- Width (crest): 8 m (26 ft)
- Dam volume: 315,250 m^{3} (412,331 cu yd)
- Spillway type: Overflow

Reservoir
- Inactive capacity: 19,050,000 m^{3} (15,444 acre⋅ft)
- Catchment area: 143.5 km^{2} (55 mi^{2})
- Surface area: 904 m^{2} (0 acres)
- Normal elevation: 1,059 m (3,474 ft)

Power Station
- Installed capacity: 1.57 MW (max. planned)

The Kavşaktepe Dam is a gravity dam under construction on the Ortasu River (a tributary of the Hezil River) in Uludere district of Şırnak Province, southeast Turkey. Under contract from Turkey's State Hydraulic Works, Be-Ha-Se Insaat began construction on the dam in 2008 and a completion date has not been announced.

The reported purpose of the dam is water storage and it can also support a 1.57 MW hydroelectric power station in the future. Another purpose of the dam which has been widely reported in the Turkish press is to reduce the freedom of movement of Kurdistan Workers' Party (PKK) militants. Blocking and flooding valleys near to the Iraq–Turkey border is expected to help curb cross-border PKK smuggling and deny caves in which ammunition can be stored. A total of 11 dams along the border; seven in Şırnak Province and four in Hakkâri Province were implemented for this purpose. In Şırnak they are the Silopi, Şırnak, Uludere and Balli Dams downstream of the Kavşaktepe Dam and the Musatepe and Çetintepe Dams upstream on the Ortasu River. In Hakkari are the Gölgeliyamaç (since cancelled) and Çocuktepe Dams on the Güzeldere River and the Aslandağ and Beyyurdu Dams on the Bembo River.

Construction was 10% complete in July 2017 and 52% complete in September 2017. Kavşaktepe Dam was still under construction as of March 2019. According to MD&A's RCC dams database, the project might be commissioned by December 31, 2020.

== See also ==
- List of dams and reservoirs in Turkey
