= Musatepe Dam =

- Location within Turkey
- Country: Turkey
- Location: Uludere, Şırnak Province
- Coordinates: 37°22′57.91″N 42°54′21.33″E
- Purpose: Water supply, military
- Status: Under construction
- Construction began: 2008
- Construction cost: US$24,640,000 (TL38,500,000) (Combined cost with Çetintepe Dam)
- Owner: State Hydraulic Works

Dam and spillways
- Type of dam: Gravity, roller-compacted concrete
- Impounds: Ortasu River
- Height: 34.5 m (113 ft)
- Length: 165 m (541 ft)
- Elevation at crest: 1,115 m (3,658 ft)
- Width (crest): 8 m (26 ft)
- Dam volume: 60,400 m^{3} (79,000 cu yd)
- Spillway type: Overflow

Reservoir
- Total capacity: 12,290,000 m^{3} (9,964 acre⋅ft)
- Catchment area: 87.7 km^{2} (34 mi^{2})

Power Station
- Installed capacity: 9 MW (planned)

The Musatepe Dam is a gravity dam under construction on the Ortasu River (a tributary of the Hezil River) in Uludere district of Şırnak Province, southeast Turkey. Under contract from Turkey's State Hydraulic Works, Ozerka Insaat began construction on the dam in 2008 and a completion date has not been announced.

The reported purpose of the dam is water storage and it can also support a 9 MW hydroelectric power station in the future. Another purpose of the dam which has been widely reported in the Turkish press is to reduce the freedom of movement of Kurdistan Workers' Party (PKK) militants. Blocking and flooding valleys close to the Iraq–Turkey border is expected to help curb cross-border PKK smuggling and deny caves in which ammunition can be stored. A total of 11 dams along the border; seven in Şırnak Province and four in Hakkâri Province were implemented for this purpose. In Şırnak they are the Silopi, Şırnak, Uludere, Balli and Kavşaktepe Dams downstream of the Musatepe Dam and the Çetintepe Dam upstream on the Ortasu River. In Hakkari are the Gölgeliyamaç (since cancelled) and Çocuktepe Dams on the Güzeldere River and the Aslandağ and Beyyurdu Dams on the Bembo River.

Construction works were estimated 52% complete in July 2015. Musatepe Dam was still under construction as of March 2019.

== See also ==
- List of dams and reservoirs in Turkey
