= Çocuktepe Dam =

- Location within Turkey
- Country: Turkey
- Location: Çukurca, Hakkâri Province
- Coordinates: 37°17′24.33″N 43°34′46.25″E
- Purpose: Water supply, military
- Status: Under construction
- Construction began: 2008
- Owner: State Hydraulic Works

Dam and spillways
- Type of dam: Gravity, roller-compacted concrete
- Impounds: Güzeldere River
- Height: 45.5 m (149 ft)
- Length: 127.44 m (418 ft)
- Elevation at crest: 963 m (3,159 ft)
- Width (crest): 8 m (26 ft)
- Spillway type: Overflow

Reservoir
- Total capacity: 3,100,000 m^{3} (2,513 acre⋅ft)
- Normal elevation: 960 m (3,150 ft)

The Çocuktepe Dam is a gravity dam under construction on the Güzeldere River (a tributary of the Great Zab) in Çukurca district of Hakkâri Province, southeast Turkey. Under contract from Turkey's State Hydraulic Works, İnelsan İnşaat began construction on the dam in 2008 and a completion date has not been announced. Construction on the Gölgeliyamaç Dam immediately upstream began in 2008 as well but was cancelled due to poor geology.

The reported purpose of the dam is water storage and it can also support a hydroelectric power station in the future. Another purpose of the dam which has been widely reported in the Turkish press is to reduce the freedom of movement of militants of the Kurdistan Workers' Party (PKK). Blocking and flooding valleys near to the Iraq–Turkey border is expected to help curb cross-border PKK smuggling and deny caves in which ammunition can be stored. A total of 11 dams along the border; seven in Şırnak Province and four in Hakkâri Province were implemented for this purpose. In Hakkâri are the Gölgeliyamaç (since cancelled) and Çocuktepe Dams on the Güzeldere River and the Aslandağ and Beyyurdu Dams on the Bembo River. In Şırnak there is the Silopi Dam on the Hezil River and the Şırnak, Uludere, Balli, Kavşaktepe, Musatepe and Çetintepe Dams on the Ortasu River.

Construction was still ongoing as of March 2019.

== See also ==
- List of dams and reservoirs in Turkey
