= Beyyurdu Dam =

- Location within Turkey
- Country: Turkey
- Location: Şemdinli, Hakkâri Province
- Coordinates: 37°20′25.43″N 44°26′00.85″E
- Purpose: Water supply, military
- Status: Operational
- Construction began: 2008
- Owner: State Hydraulic Works

Dam and spillways
- Type of dam: Gravity, roller-compacted concrete
- Impounds: Bembo River
- Height: 48 m (157 ft)
- Length: 176 m (577 ft)
- Elevation at crest: 1,273 m (4,177 ft)
- Width (crest): 8 m (26 ft)
- Spillway type: Overflow

Reservoir
- Total capacity: 8,060,000 m^{3} (6,534 acre⋅ft)
- Normal elevation: 1,271 m (4,170 ft)

The Beyyurdu Dam is a gravity dam on the Bembo River (an eventual tributary of the Great Zab) in Beyyurdu, Şemdinli district of Hakkâri Province, southeast Turkey.

== Construction ==
Under contract from Turkey's State Hydraulic Works, Özdoğan Group began construction on the dam in 2008. The construction was concluded in 2015. In July 2012 and May 2014 suspected Kurdistan Workers' Party (PKK) militants set fire to equipment at the construction sites of the Beyyurdu Dam and also the Aslandağ Dam which is located upstream.

== Function ==
The reported purpose of the dam is water storage and it can also support a hydroelectric power station in the future. Another purpose of the dam which has been widely reported in the Turkish press is to reduce the freedom of movement of PKK militants. Blocking and flooding valleys near the Iraq–Turkey border is expected to help curb cross-border PKK smuggling and deny caves in which ammunition can be stored. A total of 11 dams along the border; seven in Şırnak Province and four in Hakkâri Province were implemented for this purpose. In Hakkâri are the Gölgeliyamaç (since cancelled) and Çocuktepe Dams on the Güzeldere River and the Aslandağ and Beyyurdu Dams on the Bembo River. In Şırnak there is the Silopi Dam on the Hezil River and the Şırnak, Uludere, Balli, Kavşaktepe, Musatepe and Çetintepe Dams on the Ortasu River.

== See also ==
- List of dams and reservoirs in Turkey
