= Şırnak Dam =

- Location within Turkey
- Country: Turkey
- Location: Şırnak, Şırnak Province
- Coordinates: 37°26′28.69″N 42°44′01.44″E
- Purpose: Water supply, military
- Status: Operational
- Construction began: 2008
- Opening date: 2012
- Construction cost: US$31,680,000 (TL₺49,500,000)
- Owner: State Hydraulic Works

Dam and spillways
- Type of dam: Gravity, roller-compacted concrete
- Impounds: Ortasu River
- Height: 56.8 m (186 ft)
- Height (foundation): 66.8 m (219 ft)
- Length: 198 m (650 ft)
- Elevation at crest: 811.80 m (2,663 ft)
- Width (crest): 8 m (26 ft)
- Dam volume: 157,000 m^{3} (205,348 cu yd)
- Spillway type: Uncontrolled overflow
- Spillway capacity: 919 m^{3}/s (32,454 cu ft/s)

Reservoir
- Catchment area: 398.3 km^{2} (154 mi^{2})

Power Station
- Turbines: 2 x 2.5 MW (planned)
- Installed capacity: 5 MW (planned)

The Şırnak Dam is a gravity dam on the Ortasu River (a tributary of the Hezil River) about 25 km (16 mi) southeast of Şırnak town in Şırnak Province, southeast Turkey. Under contract from Turkey's State Hydraulic Works, AGE Inşaat began construction on the dam in 2008 and it was completed in 2012.

The reported purpose of the dam is water storage and it can also support a 5 MW hydroelectric power station in the future. Another purpose of the dam which has been widely reported in the Turkish press is to reduce the freedom of movement of Kurdistan Workers' Party (PKK) militants. Blocking and flooding valleys near the Iraq–Turkey border is expected to help curb cross-border PKK smuggling and deny caves in which ammunition can be stored. A total of 11 dams along the border; seven in Şırnak Province and four in Hakkâri Province were implemented for this purpose. In Şırnak they are the Silopi Dam downstream of the Şırnak Dam on the Hezil River and upstream is the Uludere, Balli, Kavşaktepe, Musatepe and Çetintepe Dams on the Ortasu River. In Hakkari are the Gölgeliyamaç (since cancelled) and Çocuktepe Dams on the Güzeldere River and the Aslandağ and Beyyurdu Dams on the Bembo River.

== See also ==
- List of dams and reservoirs in Turkey
