= Hakan Topal =

- Born: Çorum Province, Turkey
- Known for: Conceptual Art, Media Arts, New Media
- Movement: Conceptual

Hakan Topal is an artist living and working in Brooklyn, New York. He was the co-founder with Guven Incirlioglu of xurban collective (2000–12), and is known for his research-based conceptual art practice. He is a Professor of New Media and Art+Design at Purchase College, SUNY.

== Education and Career ==
Hakan Topal attended Middle East Technical University (METU) in Ankara, where he also grew up. Initially trained as an engineer, he became actively involved in the university’s activist networks and visual arts community, contributing to exhibitions and performances. He earned an M.A. degree from METU’s Gender and Women’s Studies graduate program.

After migrating to New York in 2000, Topal continued his academic work at The New School for Social Research in New York City, where he received both an M.A. and a Ph.D. in sociology, with a focus on urban sociology and the sociology of art. His doctoral dissertation, titled Negotiating Urban Space: Contemporary Art Biennials and the Case of New Orleans, explores the history and proliferation of large-scale, temporary art exhibitions—such as biennials, triennials, and quadrennials—and their evolving relationship to urban environments. The research centers on the Prospect New Orleans Contemporary Art Biennial, analyzing how it interacts with the city’s unique urban context and supports site-specific artistic production.

From 1996 to 2000, Topal worked at METU GISAM (Audio Visual Research and Production Center) in Ankara, collaborating with artists and scholars—including Ulus Baker, Ali Demirel, Aras Özgün, and Ersan Ocak — on experimental media and new media projects. After relocating to New York, he served as New Media Projects Manager at the New Museum from 2001 to 2008.

Before joining Purchase College, where he is a full professor and department chair, Topal taught at the City University of New York and the MFA Fine Arts program at School of Visual Arts.

== Exhibitions ==
Topal has exhibited his collective and individual artworks and research projects in leading international institutions, including the 8th and 9th Istanbul Biennials; apexart, New York; Thyssen-Bornemisza Art Contemporary (TBA21), Vienna; Kunst-Werke, Berlin; ZKM Center for Art and Media, Karlsruhe; MoMA PS1, New York; Platform, Istanbul; and Roundtable: The 9th Gwangju Biennale in South Korea.

His work was included in the exhibition Perpetual Revolution: The Image and Social Change at the International Center of Photography (ICP) Museum, New York, and later acquired by the institution.

In 2022, Topal presented the solo exhibition Temporary Assembly of Living Things at DEPO Istanbul, a project that explored collective memory, spatial politics, and socio-political trauma.

That same year, Topal premiered The Golden Cage (2022), a multi-site project focused on the northern bald ibis (“kelaynak” in Turkish), the most endangered migratory bird in the Middle East. The work responds to the ecological and political vulnerability of this semi-wild colony, whose survival was threatened during the ISIS occupation of Palmyra. By focusing on their confinement near the Turkish–Syrian border, Topal investigates broader questions of migration, nationalism, state power, and ecological preservation. The project was commissioned and exhibited by Künstlerhaus Mousonturm in Frankfurt, the Aga Khan Museum in Toronto, and DEPO Istanbul.

As part of xurban collective, Topal represented Turkey at the 49th Venice Biennale in 2001.

== Publications ==
Topal's texts and projects have been featured in numerous international journals, books, and catalogs.

He is co-editor of The Sea-Image: Visual Manifestations of Port Cities and Global Waters, developed through visual research and an international symposium for the Istanbul European Capital of Culture 2010.

Topal's conceptual book project and video installation Still Life juxtaposes the grief and resilience of the Roboski families with the broader context of the Turkish government’s war on terror. The work focuses on the aftermath of the 2011 Roboski massacre, in which 34 Kurdish civilians—mostly teenagers—were killed in a Turkish airstrike near the Iraqi border. Still Life reflects on state violence, mourning, and the politics of representation. Rather than offering journalistic documentation, Topal constructs a nuanced, symbolic narrative that interrogates how loss is framed and remembered. Critics have noted that the work resists sensationalism, instead offering "a quiet space for contemplation and grief."
