= Ferhat Encü =

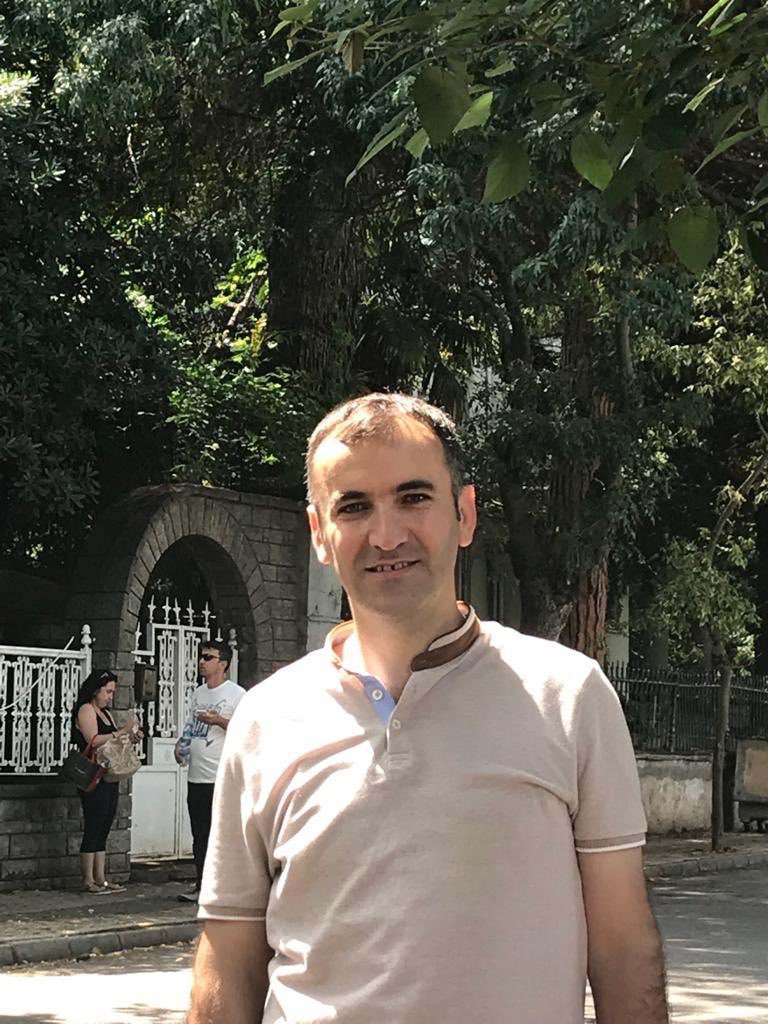

Member of Parliament
- In office 7 June 2015 – 1 November 2015
- In office 1 November 2015 – 6 February 2018

Personal details
- Born: Ferhat Encü; 5 August 1985 (age 41) Uludere
- Citizenship: Turkey
- Party: HDP

Ferhat Encü (born 5 August 1985) is a Kurdish politician and former member of the Turkish Parliament in the Şırnak Province. Encü is well known for a speech that he gave on the floor of the Parliament in Ankara. In his speech, Encü criticized the Turkish government for their alleged violence and mistreatment of the Kurds. After delivering the speech, Encü was arrested and stripped of his parliamentary immunity.

== Early life ==
Encü was born on August 5, 1985, in the village of Gülyazı in Uludere district of the Şırnak Province in Turkey. He attended and graduated from high school in Turkey and speaks Kurdish at a very high level. In 2009, Encü began to study at the Çukurova University in Adana, Turkey, but took a break from education in order to focus on speaking for the victims of the Roboski massacre after 2011. During the Roboski massacre, he lost 11 relatives. After, Encü began pursuing a political career in Turkey and on 7 June 2015, he was elected MP for the Peoples' Democratic Party (HDP). He was re-elected in the snap elections of 1 November 2015.

== Political career and prosecution ==
In the years following the Roboski Airstrike, Ferhat Encü has been actively fighting for justice for the village of Roboski. Initially, Encü served as the official spokesperson for Roboski with the assistance of his younger brother Veli Encü, but Ferhat eventually pursued a career in Turkish government as a lawmaker so that he would be able to launch a legitimate official inquiry into the Roboski Massacre. Encü's membership in Turkish Parliament however was cut short in late 2016 when he was arrested and convicted of “making propaganda for a terrorist organisation.”

=== Encü's Speech in Ankara ===
In early February, 2016, Ferhat Encü delivered a speech on the floor of the parliament in Ankara, the capital of Turkey. In his speech, Encü delivered very critical remarks about the Turkish Government and their mistreatment of Kurdish people, specifically referencing the Roboski Massacre and the Turkish government's ongoing conflict with the PKK. Encü's six minute long speech was constantly interrupted by members of Turkish Parliament yelled at Encü, accusing him of terrorist affiliation, treason and even threatening his life for his remarks against the Turkish government. Eventually, a brawl broke out on the floor of parliament as members of the Justice and Development Party (Turkish: Adalet ve Kalkınma Partisi, abbreviated AKP) were reported to have been shoving Encü and accusing him of supporting a terrorist organization. Another report stated that punching and slapping was occurring as deputies reacted to the words of Encü. Prior to the speech, Encü had been known for his opposition to the Turkish government for their violence against the Kurds.

==== Arrest ====
In the years leading up to the speech that Encü delivered on the floor of Ankara, Encü had struggled with political and legal issues quite frequently. During the inquest against Encü following the Roboski massacre, he was accused of assault against the Uludere district's governor and was arrested and detained as a result. After his speech in Ankara, Encü was arrested and held in a pre-trial detention center until November, when Encü was officially convicted of alienating the public from military service, terrorist propaganda, incitement to animosity, entering military prohibited zones, attempted murder of a public official for their duty. Following the conviction, Encü was stripped of his parliamentary immunity and imprisoned in the Kandira F-type prison. According to Turkey's constitution, any conviction involving terrorism charges precludes parliamentary dictatorship. Encü was one of nine Kurdish HDP MPs who were arrested in the wake of legislation proposal about lifting the parliamentary immunities of HDP MPs who summary of proceedings were issued for. As of November 13, 2017 all nine HDP MPs remained behind bars.

==== Release ====
In a separate trial that concluded in 2018, Encü was sentenced to 10 months in prison for insulting the government. He was released in June, 2019, after completing his sentence.

The State Prosecutor at the Court of Cassation in Turkey Bekir Şahin filed a lawsuit before the Constitutional Court on the 17 March 2021, demanding for Encü and 686 other HDP politicians a five-year ban to engage in politics. The lawsuit was filed together with the request for a closure of the HDP due to the parties alleged organizational links with the PKK.
