= Bagli =

Bagli may refer to:

- Bagli, Dewas, a town in Madhya Pradesh, India
  - Bagli Tehsil, the administrative division of Dewas district encompassing the town
  - Bagli Assembly constituency, a seat in the Madhya Pradesh Legislative Assembly
- Bagli Party or Bagler, a political faction during the Norwegian Civil Wars
- Bağlı, Aksaray, a village in Aksaray Province, Turkey
- Bağlı, Osmangazi, a village in Bursa Province, Turkey
- Bağlı, Uludere, a village in Şırnak Province, Turkey
- Bağlı, Yenice, a village in Çanakkale Province, Turkey
