= Silopi Dam =

- Location within Turkey
- Country: Turkey
- Location: Silopi, Şırnak Province
- Coordinates: 37°20′17.43″N 42°43′41.20″E
- Purpose: Water supply, military
- Status: Operational
- Construction began: 2008
- Opening date: 2012
- Construction cost: US$75,200,000 (TL117,500,000)
- Owner: State Hydraulic Works

Dam and spillways
- Type of dam: Gravity, roller-compacted concrete
- Impounds: Hezil River
- Height: 79.5 m (261 ft)
- Length: 356 m (1,168 ft)
- Width (crest): 8 m (26 ft)
- Dam volume: 718,410 m^{3} (939,645 cu yd)

Reservoir
- Total capacity: 28,914,000 m^{3} (23,441 acre⋅ft)
- Catchment area: 1,727 km^{2} (667 mi^{2})
- Surface area: 1.002 km^{2} (0 mi^{2})
- Normal elevation: 657.7 m (2,158 ft)

Power Station
- Installed capacity: 2.4 MW (planned)

The Silopi Dam is a gravity dam on the Hezil River about 24 km (15 mi) northeast of Silopi in Şırnak Province, southeast Turkey. Under contract from Turkey's State Hydraulic Works, İLCİ Holding A.Ş began construction on the dam in 2008 and it was completed in November 2012.

The reported purpose of the dam is water storage for drinking supply and it can also support a 2.4 MW hydroelectric power station in the future. In January 2013 a project to deliver water from the dam through 39.3 km (24 mi) of pipes to a water treatment plant Silopi began. The pipeline is expected to be complete in 2014 and the water treatment should be operational in 2015. Another purpose of the dam which has been widely report in the Turkish press is to reduce the freedom of movement of Kurdistan Workers' Party (PKK) militants. Blocking and flooding valleys close to the Iraq–Turkey border is expected to help curb cross-border PKK smuggling and deny caves to which ammunition can be stored in. A total of 11 dams along the border; seven in Şırnak Province and four in Hakkâri Province were implemented for this purpose. In Şırnak they are the Şırnak Dam upstream of the Silopi Dam on the Ortasu River and further upstream is the Uludere, Balli, Kavşaktepe, Musatepe and Çetintepe Dams also on the Ortasu River. In Hakkari are the Gölgeliyamaç (since cancelled) and Çocuktepe Dams on the Güzeldere River and the Aslandağ and Beyyurdu Dams on the Bembo River.

== See also ==
- List of dams and reservoirs in Turkey
