= Dağdibi, Uludere =

Village in Şırnak Province, Turkey

Dağdibi
- Village
- Location within Turkey
- Coordinates: 37.393°N 43.102°E
- Country: Turkey
- Province: Şırnak
- District: Uludere
- Population (2023): 1,095
- Time zone: UTC+3 (TRT)

Dağdibi (Kurdish: Hedrîn) is a village in the Uludere district of Şırnak Province in Turkey. The village is populated by Kurds of the Goyan and Sindî tribes and had a population of 1,095 in 2023.

The hamlet of Konacık is attached to Dağdibi.

== Population ==
Population history from 2007 to 2023:

Population
| Year | Pop. | ±% |
|---|---|---|
| 2007 | 1,123 | — |
| 2010 | 1,300 | +15.8% |
| 2015 | 1,340 | +3.1% |
| 2020 | 975 | −27.2% |
| 2023 | 1,095 | +12.3% |
