= Bağlıca, Uludere =

Village in Şırnak Province, Turkey

Bağlıca
- Village
- Location within Turkey
- Coordinates: 37.431°N 42.776°E
- Country: Turkey
- Province: Şırnak
- District: Uludere
- Population (2023): 888
- Time zone: UTC+3 (TRT)

Bağlıca (Kurdish: Kudin) is a village in the Uludere District of Şırnak Province in Turkey. The village is populated by Kurds of the Goyan tribe and had a population of 888 in 2023.

The hamlet of Kalemli (Daloka) is attached to Bağlıca.

The village was depopulated in the 1990s during the Kurdish–Turkish conflict.

== Population ==
Population history from 2007 to 2023:

Population
Year	Pop.	±%
2007	323	—
2010	334	+3.4%
2015	452	+35.3%
2020	770	+70.4%
2023	888	+15.3%
