= Yemişli, Uludere =

Village in Şırnak Province, Turkey

Yemişli
- Village
- Location within Turkey
- Coordinates: 37.369°N 43.079°E
- Country: Turkey
- Province: Şırnak
- District: Uludere
- Population (2023): 2,749
- Time zone: UTC+3 (TRT)

Yemişli (Kurdish: Mergeh; Syriac: Margā) is a village in the Uludere District of Şırnak Province in Turkey. The village is populated by Kurds of the Goyan tribe and had a population of 2,749 in 2023.

The hamlet of Yekmal is attached to Yemişli.

== History ==
Margā (today called Yemişli) was historically inhabited by Chaldean Catholics. There were 760 Chaldean Catholics in 1913 and the village had one church and one priest as part of the diocese of Zakho. The village was destroyed by the Ottoman Army in June 1915 amidst the Sayfo and its inhabitants were later resettled at Berseve near Zakho in Iraq.

== Population ==
Population history from 2007 to 2023:

Population
Year	Pop.	±%
2007	2,119	—
2010	2,365	+11.6%
2015	3,433	+45.2%
2020	2,885	−16.0%
2023	2,749	−4.7%

== Bibliography ==
- Baz, Ibrahim (2016). Şırnak aşiretleri ve kültürü (in Turkish). ISBN 9786058849631.
- Wilmshurst, David (2000). The Ecclesiastical Organisation of the Church of the East, 1318–1913 (PDF). Peeters Publishers.
- Yacoub, Joseph (2016). Year of the Sword: The Assyrian Christian Genocide, A History. Translated by James Ferguson. Oxford University Press.
