= Sharanish =

Village in Kurdistan

- Village
- Location in Iraq Sharanish (Iraqi Kurdistan)
- Coordinates: 37°14′02″N 42°50′46″E
- Country: Iraq
- Region: Kurdistan Region
- Governorate: Dohuk Governorate
- District: Zakho District

Population (2016)
  - Total: 220

Sharanish is a village in Dohuk Governorate in Kurdistan Region, Iraq. (Note: Alternatively transliterated as Sharanesh, Sharanush, Sharansh, or Sharansh al-'Ulya. (Hebrew: שראנש; Kurdish: شرانش, romanized: Şêraniş; Syriac: ܫܪܢܘܫ).) It is located near the Iraq–Turkey border in the district of Zakho. The village has two Chaldean Catholic churches, Mart Shmune and Mar Kiriakos.

== Etymology ==
According to local tradition, the name of the village is derived from an ancient princess named Shiranoosh.

== History ==
Sharanish was formerly home to one of the oldest Jewish communities in the region. The nearby river was used as a mikveh, and the community had its own graveyard. In the 18th century, Jews from Sharanish migrated to the Jewish village of Sandur. The synagogue was converted into the church of Mart Shmune. The church of Mar Kiriakos is purported to be over 400 years old. In 1913, 600 Chaldean Catholics inhabited Sharanish, and were served by one priest and two functioning churches as part of the diocese of Zakho. To escape the Assyrian genocide, during the First World War, the population of Sharanish fled with Agha Petros, and eventually returned after seven years. In the 1920s, the village was controlled by the Sindi tribe, and its agha (chief) Jamil resented British rule, and thus he ambushed and killed six policemen, likely former or active Assyrian levies, near Sharanish in April 1925.

Sharanish was populated by 384 Assyrians in 1957. The village was looted and destroyed by Iraqi soldiers and Zebari Kurds during the First Iraqi–Kurdish War in 1961. Until the village's destruction, there were 80 households at Sharanish. The village was rebuilt as its inhabitants gradually returned and, by 1978, 2000 Assyrians in 160 families inhabited Sharanish with a school. The village was largely destroyed by the Iraqi army in 1987 during the Al-Anfal campaign, and 80 families were displaced, and most fled to urban centres, such as Baghdad and Mosul. Some villagers returned to Sharanish, but several people were killed by Turkish airstrikes in 1991 as part of the Kurdish-Turkish conflict, and only 2 people remained by 1995. As a consequence of the Iraq War, Assyrians in urban centres suffered from attacks, and returned to Sharanish in the early 2000s.

In 2005, the Hezel Foundation constructed 83 houses, a church, hall, and school. In 2015, 570 displaced people inhabited Sharanish, including a number of Yazidis, in addition to the village's population of 141 Assyrians. Sharanish was bombed by the Turkish Air Force on 17 January 2016 on the pretext of combatting the Kurdistan Workers' Party (PKK), and the village's population found temporary refuge in Zakho. (Note: The Assyrian Confederation of Europe put the population of the village in January 2016 as 80 Assyrian families, whereas Kurdistan 24 reported Sharanish was inhabited by 220 Assyrians, with 50 families.) The village was further damaged by Turkish airstrikes from 22 to 24 March 2019. The village was also bombarded in 2019 by Turkish artillery on 29 March, and 6 April, with no casualties. Humanitarian aid was delivered to families displaced by the Turkish bombing in Sharanish by the Assyrian Aid Society in August 2019. The village was hit again by Turkish airstrikes in June 2021.

== Notable people ==
- Alphonse Mingana (1878–1937), Assyrian scholar

== Bibliography ==
- Donabed, Sargon George (2015). Reforging a Forgotten History: Iraq and the Assyrians in the Twentieth Century. Edinburgh University Press.
- Eshoo, Majed (2004). The Fate Of Assyrian Villages Annexed To Today's Dohuk Governorate In Iraq And The Conditions In These Villages Following The Establishment Of The Iraqi State In 1921 (PDF). Translated by Mary Challita.
- Kiraz, George A. (2011). "Mingana, Alphonse". In Sebastian P. Brock; Aaron M. Butts; George A. Kiraz; Lucas Van Rompay (eds.). Gorgias Encyclopedic Dictionary of the Syriac Heritage. Piscataway, NJ: Gorgias Press. pp. 292–293.
- KRSO (2009), "2009 - ناوی پاریزگا. يه که کارگيرييه كانی پاریزگاكانی هه ریمی کوردستان" (PDF), Kurdistan Region Statistics Office (KRSO) (in Kurdish), pp. 1–179
- Wilmshurst, David (2000). The Ecclesiastical Organisation of the Church of the East, 1318–1913 (PDF). Peeters Publishers.
- Zaken, Mordechai (2007). Jewish Subjects and Their Tribal Chieftains in Kurdistan: A Study in Survival. Brill.
