= Petros Hanna Issa Al-Harboli =

Petros Hanna Issa Al-Harboli (July 1, 1946 Zakho, Dahuk, Iraq– November 3, 2010 Zaku, Iraq) was the Catholic bishop of the Chaldean Catholic Church Diocese of Zakho, Iraq. Ordained to the priesthood in 1970, he was ordained a bishop in 2002.
