= Şenoba, Uludere =

Municipality in Şırnak Province, Turkey

Şenoba
- Municipality
- Location in Turkey
- Coordinates: 37.462°N 42.723°E
- Country: Turkey
- Province: Şırnak
- District: Uludere
- Population (2023): 7,691
- Time zone: UTC+3 (TRT)

Şenoba (Kurdish: Sêgirik) is a town (belde) in the Uludere District of Şırnak Province in Turkey. It is populated by Kurds of the Goyan tribe and had a population of 7,691 in 2023.

== Population ==
Population history from 2007 to 2023:

Population
Year	Pop.	±%
2007	6,117	—
2010	4,898	−19.9%
2015	6,431	+31.3%
2020	7,812	+21.5%
2023	7,691	−1.5%
