= Xurban collective =

Artist collective founded in 2000

xurban_collective
- Purpose: Conceptual art
- Headquarters: New York City, İzmir, Istanbul

Xurban collective (stylized as xurban_collective, 2000–2012) was an international art collective founded in 2000. Core members of the group are Guven Incirlioglu and Hakan Topal, whose transatlantic collaborations took the form of media projects and installations. The collective remained active until 2012 and gained recognition for its critical, research-driven projects, which explored geopolitical conflict, militarism, ecology, extraction, displacement, and urban transformation. Their interdisciplinary practice integrated media such as video, photography, cartography, and digital platforms, often grounded in methods from sociology, political science, archeology and architecture.

== Members ==
Guven Incirligioglu (1960) studied architecture, photography, and art theory (Ph.D.) and has exhibited since the 1980s in group shows and has held one-person exhibitions in New York, Ankara, Istanbul, Sarajevo, Sofia, and other locations, working primarily with photography, photo-mechanical materials, and new media. He was a lecturer in art and design in various schools in Turkey, including Bilkent University, Ankara, and Istanbul Bilgi University and Economy University's Faculty of Art and Design in Izmir.

Hakan Topal is an artist and scholar living and working in New York City. He is a full professor of New Media and Art+Design at SUNY's Purchase College

Over the last decade, xurban_collective collaborated with numerous other cultural producers, including Ali Demirel, Mehmet Ali Üzelgün, Atif Akın, Elif Akşit, Akın Gülseren, Jillian McDonald, Bülent Öztürk, and Mahir Yıldırım.

== Exhibitions ==
xurban_collective exhibited internationally including projects in institutions such as the 49th Venice Biennial (2001), the 8th International Istanbul Biennial (2003), PS1/MoMA (2005), Apexart (2004), Exitart (2005) and ZKM – Center for Art and Media, Karlsruhe (2004). xurban_collective participated in the "Political/Minimal" show curated by Klaus Biesenbach (MoMA, New York). xurban_collective is exbitited at TBA21-Vienna (2010), The National Contemporary Art Museum, Athens (2010) and Arter-Istanbul (2011) and participated in ROUNDTABLE: The 9th Gwangju Biennale, which took place September 7 – November 11, 2012 in Gwangju, Korea.
