= Emine Kara =

Kurdish militant (c. 1970s–2022)

- Born: 1974; Hilal, Uludere, Turkey
- Died: 23 December 2022 (aged 47–48); Paris, France
- Cause of death: Gunshot wounds
- Occupations: Militant, activist, teacher

Emine Kara, also known by the nom de guerre Evîn Goyî, (1974 – 23 December 2022) was a Turkish Kurdish militant and political activist who served as president of the Mouvement des femmes kurdes en France.

Originally from Turkey, she fled to the Kurdistan Region in Iraq in 1994 after her village was massacred. She joined the Kurdish cause in 1988 and participated in the war of the Autonomous Administration of North and East Syria (AANES) against the Islamic State in 2014. After sustaining an injury in Raqqa, she moved to Europe for medical treatment in 2020. She was killed in the 2022 Paris shooting.

== Biography ==
Born in 1974 in Hilal in the Şırnak Province, Turkey, she was the fourth child out of five. Her family moved to Iraq in 1994, where they settled in a refugee camp in Zakho before permanently moving to Makhmur.

=== Military career ===
Kara joined the Kurdish militant movement in 1988. She fought and campaigned for Kurdistan in Turkey, Iraq, Syria, and Iran. In 2014, she joined the militias organized to defend an self-declared autonomous area (the later AANES) formed by the Democratic Union Party, which had close links with the Turkish Kurdistan Workers' Party, during the Syrian civil war. She took part in the struggle against the Islamic State in Kobanî and the Battle of Raqqa.

=== Exile in France ===
Kara was injured in Raqqa in 2019 and left after the fall of the Islamic State, moving to France, then Germany for medical treatment, before returning to Paris in September 2020. She became a teacher and applied for asylum but was refused by the French Office for the Protection of Refugees and Stateless Persons in February 2022. The decision was confirmed by the Cour nationale du droit d'asile in August 2022, although an appeal was in order.

In Paris, Kara continued her commitment to the Kurdish cause, becoming president of the Mouvement des femmes kurdes en France. According to the French newspaper Libération, she was a heroine within the European Kurdish diaspora. She voiced her support for the Mahsa Amini protests during the last months of her life. She was credited with popularizing the slogan Woman, Life, Freedom, utilized by the women's wing of the Peace and Democracy Party. She also initiated several demonstrations in Paris in support of Mahsa Amini.

=== Death ===
On 23 December 2022, Emine Kara was killed in a shooting perpetrated by a right-wing anti-Kurdish extremist. She was participating in a meeting to prepare for a commemorative march for the tenth anniversary of the Triple murder of Kurdish activists in Paris. Two Kurdish men were also killed in the attack. All three are considered martyrs by Kurds.
