= Ortabağ, Uludere =

Village in Şırnak Province, Turkey

Ortabağ
- Village
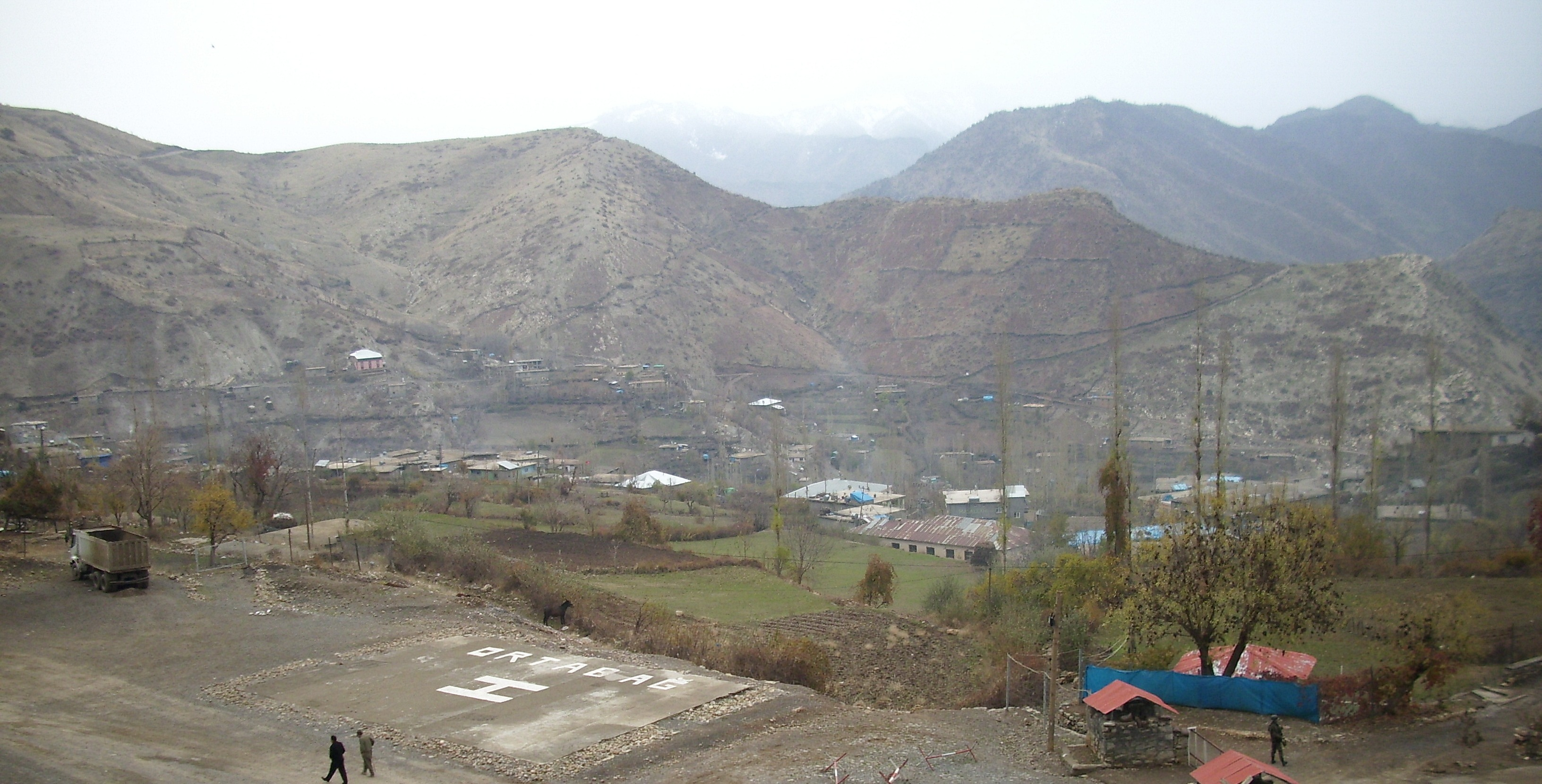
- Village

- Location within Turkey
- Coordinates: 37.395°N 42.911°E
- Country: Turkey
- Province: Şırnak
- District: Uludere
- Population (2023): 2,289
- Time zone: UTC+3 (TRT)

Ortabağ (Kurdish: Kirur) is a village in the Uludere District of Şırnak Province in Turkey. The village is populated by Kurds of the Goyan tribe and had a population of 2,289 in 2023.

== Population ==
Population history from 2007 to 2023:

Population
Year	Pop.	±%
2007	2,098	—
2010	2,249	+7.2%
2015	2,406	+7.0%
2020	2,251	−6.4%
2023	2,289	+1.7%
