= Roboski massacre =

Airstrike on Kurdish smugglers near the Turkish-Iraqi border

- Part of the Kurdistan Workers' Party insurgency
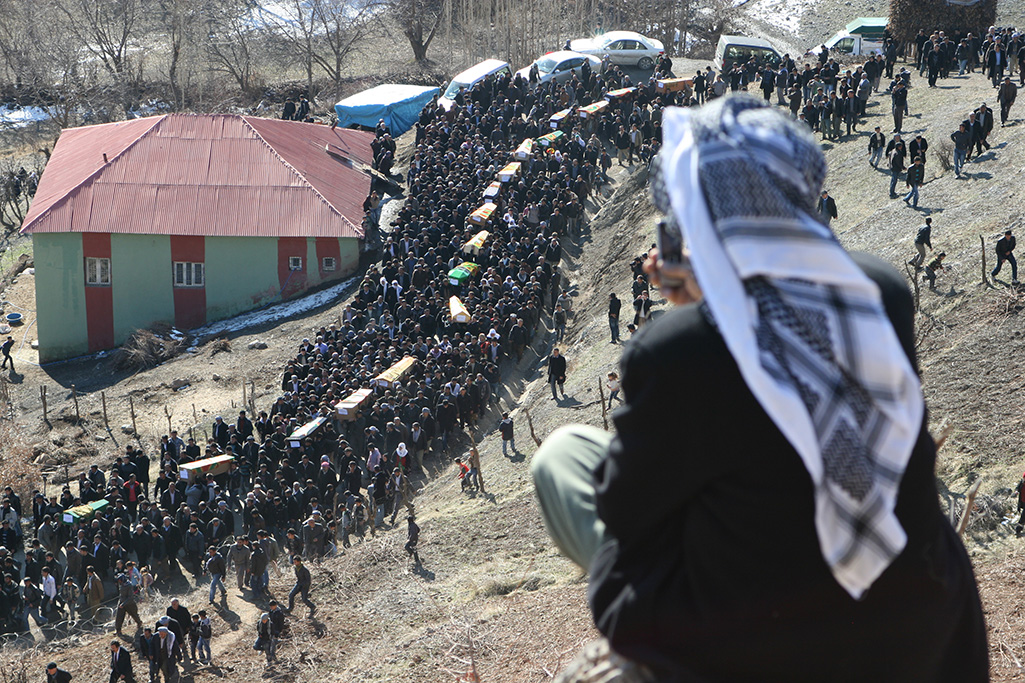
- Funeral procession of the victims
- Location: Uludere, Şırnak Province, Turkey
- Date: December 28, 2011; 9:37 pm (UTC+02:00)
- Target: PKK; Kurdish smugglers
- Attack type: Aerial attack
- Weapon: F-16 Fighting Falcon
- Deaths: 34
- Perpetrators: Turkish Air Force: Yaşar Güler; Hulusi Akar; Necdet Özel

The Roboski massacre (Kurdish: Komkujiya Roboskî), also known as the Uludere incident, took place on December 28, 2011, at Ortasu, Uludere near the Iraq-Turkey border, when the Turkish Air Force bombed a group of Kurdish civilians who had been involved in smuggling gasoline and cigarettes, killing 34. According to a statement of the Turkish Air Force, the group was mistaken for members of the Kurdistan Workers' Party (PKK).

== Incident ==
A group of 40 Kurdish villagers were moving on the night of December 28, 2011, from Iraqi territory towards the Turkish border. They were mostly teenagers from the Encü family of Ortasu in the Uludere district of Şırnak Province, Turkey. According to Turkish information, they were smuggling cigarettes, diesel oil, and other goods packed on mules into Turkey.

Turkish Armed Forces (TAF) received information about activities in the region on the night of December 28, which was supplied by United States intelligence services based on a U.S. drone footage. The TAF and Yaşar Güler reviewed the footage from the unmanned aerial vehicles flying over the terrain and evaluated the smugglers as a group of militants of the Kurdistan Workers' Party (PKK). Then Yaşar Güler later conveyed the issue to General Hulusi Akar. A few hours later at around 20:00, upon the instructions of Chief of General Staff General Necdet Özel, an air operation launched.

Pentagon officials were quoted as saying that American drones initially spotted the group, but after alerting the Turks their offer to conduct more detailed surveillance was declined, and "Turkish officers instead directed the Americans who were remotely piloting the drone to fly it somewhere else." Two F-16 Fighting Falcons of the Turkish Air Force bombed the area.

The next morning, relatives searched for the missing people, and found the bodies of the victims. 34 people belonging to the group were killed during and shortly after the airstrike. The villagers who went to the scene of the strike reported that 13 people were still alive as they arrived, and the bodies of others were still burning, with many subsequently bleeding or freezing to death. Two smugglers escaped to Iraq. Only one survivor, Servet Encü, returned to his village. 28 of the dead were from the Encü family. The bodies, some of them burnt beyond recognition or dismembered, were transported to their hometown on mules due to the rough terrain.

Servet Encü stated that generations of people in his village and neighboring settlements had been in the smuggling business due to financial need. He added that Iraqi traders brought diesel oil or tea by vehicles to within 2–3 km (1.2–1.9 mi) of the border, and the villagers bought the goods and brought them home on trails, which took about two and a half hours. He said that the smuggling action had been well known to the border security forces.

The victims were young, seventeen out of 34 victims were children aged under 18. with most being between the ages of 13 to 18.

== Funeral ==
The funeral of the victims, following an autopsy performed at the Uludere hospital, took place at a newly established cemetery between the villages Ortasu and Gülyazı. The funeral convoy, formed by about 1,000 vehicles and attended by a crowd of about 10,000 people, covered the distance of 20 km (12 mi) between the district center and the cemetery in one hour.

== Protests ==
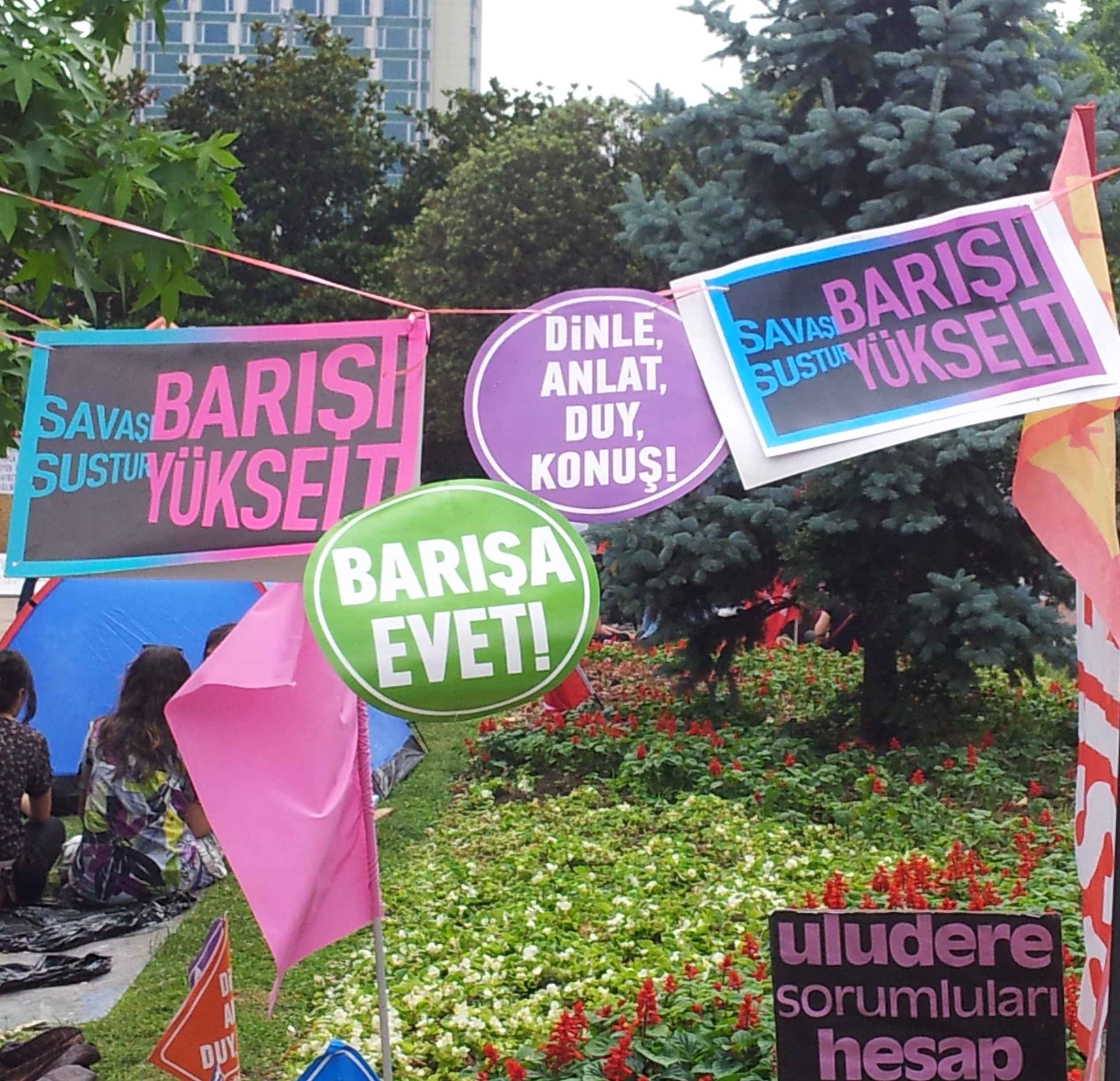
A banner during the Gezi Park protests demanding prosecution for perpetrators of the airstrike in Uludere, bottom right

Major protests followed in Turkey's predominantly Kurdish cities. In Diyarbakır, protests turned violent with police using batons and tear gas against protesters who threw stones and Molotov cocktails at police. Protests were also held in Ankara and Istanbul, where over 1,000 protesters gathered in Taksim Square; they threw stones at police and smashed vehicles before police dispersed the crowds with tear gas and water cannons.

District governor Naif Yavuz, who was at the autopsy and the funeral service, later paid a condolence visit to the houses of the relatives of the victims. Shortly after his visit, he was attacked by a mob, which attempted to lynch him. He escaped the attack with the help of his security guards, and was hospitalized for his injuries. The attack was made by people from outside the village.

In Nicosia, around 300 Kurdish Cypriots marched on the Turkish embassy in Northern Cyprus, where Murat Kanatlı, head of the left-wing New Cyprus Party, spoke to the crowd and accused Turkey of escalating tensions in the country's southeast. The demonstration ended peacefully.

In Tehran, a group of Iranian Kurds demonstrated in front of the Turkish embassy.

In Erbil, Iraq, the killings were protested by some 500 Iraqi Kurds, some of whom clashed with Iraqi Kurdistan security forces; no casualties were reported. Some protesters carried pictures of PKK leader Abdullah Öcalan and chanted "fight, fight for freedom" and "Erdogan is a terrorist". At the protest, Kurdish activist Ali Mahmoud told the press that "The crime ... is a real genocide, a war crime and a crime against humanity, and breaches international laws, we demand that Turkey be judged in the international courts."

== Responses ==
Bahoz Erdal, the leader of the PKK's military wing, called for a Kurdish uprising in response to the attack: "We urge the people of Kurdistan... to react after this massacre and seek a settling of accounts through uprisings." Meanwhile, Peace and Democracy Party (BDP) leader Selahattin Demirtaş released a statement claiming that "It’s clearly a massacre of civilians, of whom the oldest is 20," but he called for Kurds to respond through democratic means. He also quoted Erdoğan on Syrian President Bashar al-Assad: "A leader who kills his own people has lost his legitimacy" and said "now I say the same thing back to him."

Prime minister Recep Tayyip Erdoğan made assurances that essential administrative and judicial investigations were initiated. Hüseyin Çelik, the deputy chairman and spokesman of the ruling party AK Party, announced that the families of the victims would be compensated constituting a "material apology". He added that a verbal apology could follow after incident's details were uncovered.

The Republican People's Party (CHP), Turkey's largest opposition party, sharply criticized what they perceived as the government's attempt to portray the incident as understandable collateral damage, with Kurdish CHP deputy Sezgin Tanrikulu saying that "If there are some who think that death of these innocents is just a natural result of the struggle against terror, it means that Turkey has already been divided on moral grounds."

Graeme Wood at the New York Times blog asked if Erdoğan was a 'New Assad' dictator and oppressor.

In a MetroPOLL public opinion survey of 1,174 Turkish people, 14.5% said the state was ultimately responsible for the deaths, 11.5% said the smugglers, 9.5% said the PKK, 5.4% said the prime minister of the government and 4.9% said it was the General Staff. When asked whether the government had fulfilled its responsibilities towards the incident, some 45% said yes, with 38.1% saying no.

== Legal procedures ==
On March 22, 2013, a special investigative commission at the Turkish Grand National Assembly found that there had been no deliberate intent by the officials involved. On January 7, 2014, a criminal investigation against the state officials concluded with a plea of negligence. Various charges were also pressed against the civilians and families of the deceased, some of which ended in sentences against individuals.

=== Against officials involved ===
On January 9, 2012, the commander of the Gülyazı military border post near Roboski, Gendarmerie Colonel Hüseyin Onur Güney, was suspended from duty following a military investigation. 17 active duty army staff were also prosecuted for allowing border smuggling.

On January 9, 2012, a special commission to investigate the Uludere airstrike was established at the Turkish Grand National Assembly. During the hearings, opposition MPs complained that the Ministry of Defence declined to answer questions and used the confidentiality order taken by the prosecutors office as an excuse. On March 22, 2013, the commission submitted an 85-page report which concluded that the military operation which ended with 34 civilian casualties was without deliberate intent. Three members of the commission from the opposition parties lodged a minute of dissent to the report, mainly criticising the lack of thorough investigation.

The criminal investigation was administered by the Diyarbakır State Prosecutor's Office. Prosecutors admitted to being delayed while waiting for documents they had demanded from the office of Chief of General Staff, which were needed before they could interrogate military personnel. Despite the limitations, prosecutors were able to confirm on August 6, 2012, that the villagers were clearly discernible from the footage of the unmanned aerial vehicle taken before the airstrike. The Wall Street Journal reported that it was a U.S. drone that spotted the group on the Iraqi border. On June 11, 2013, the Diyarbakır Prosecutor's Office, after investigating the case for more than 18 months, found negligence rather than deliberate intent by the military staff. They then declared a lack of jurisdiction and transferred the investigation to the military prosecutor.

On January 7, 2014, military prosecutors (the General Staff Military Prosecutor's Office) decided to not press charges (nolle prosequi) against the military personnel, citing that no investigation was necessary for suspected military staff İlhan Bölük, Yıldırım Güvenç, Aygün Eker, Halil Erkek and Ali Rıza Kuğu as "they committed a major error but performed their duties within the given orders".

Previously, on May 23, 2012, then Minister of Interior İdris Naim Şahin stated that the authorisation for the operation had been given at the air forces command centre in Ankara. On January 7, 2014, it was reported that the Chief of General Staff, Necdet Özel, had authorised the operation approximately 90 minutes before the first strike. In January 2012 the pro-Kurdish Peace and Democracy Party (BDP) filed a lawsuit against the Turkish government at the International Criminal Court (ICC). In December 2013 the ICC ruled it won't accept the lawsuit, since Turkey has not signed the Rome Statute.

=== Regarding civilians and families of the deceased ===
Five persons were arrested for attempting to murder Uludere district governor Naif Yavuz on 9 January 2012.

On January 16, 2012, survivors Davut, Servet and Hacı Encü were tried on passport law abuse, illegal border-crossing and smuggling charges.

On June 28, 2012, six months after the airstrike, NGO members and relatives of the deceased who intended to protest at the site of the deaths were subjected to police violence and were dispersed by pressurised water cannons. On 25 December 2012, four days before the anniversary of the airstrike, the police detained 19 individuals in and around Sirnak.

Among the relatives of the deceased, Ferhat Encü, who lost 11 relatives in the airstrike, has been subject to continuous harassment by the police, reportedly being taken into custody four times on the same charge. He later became a member of parliament for the Peoples' Democratic Party (HDP) but was dismissed and jailed for 10 months following a speech in parliament in which he condemned the Roboski airstrike. Encü was prosecuted and sentenced for terrorist propaganda was released after 10 months.

== See also ==
- Şırnak clashes (2015–2016)
- Turkish war crimes
- Human rights in Turkey
