= Andaç, Uludere =

Village in Şırnak Province, Turkey

Andaç
- Village
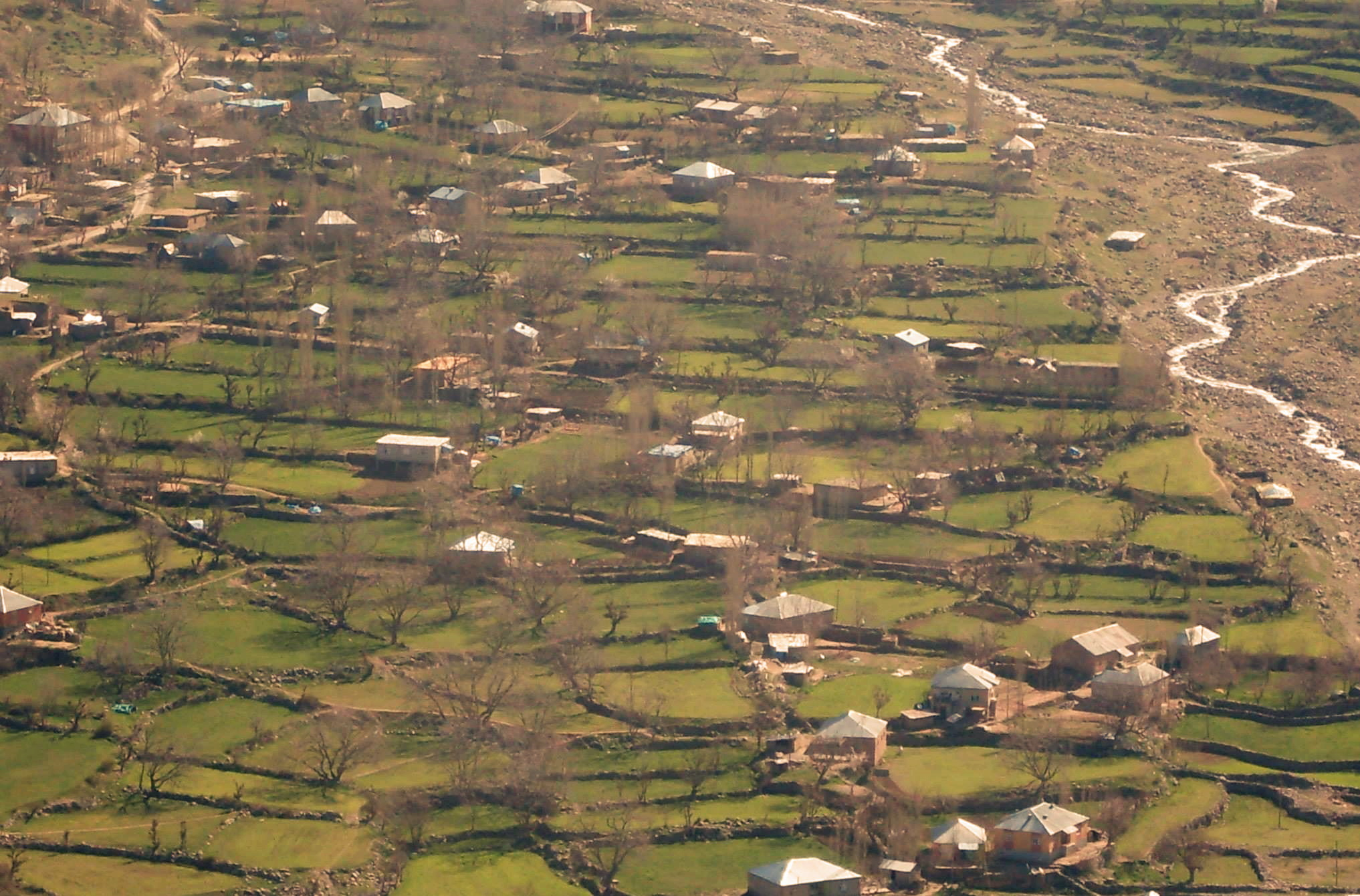
- Village

- Location within Turkey
- Coordinates: 37.356°N 43.263°E
- Country: Turkey
- Province: Şırnak
- District: Uludere
- Population (2023): 3,386
- Time zone: UTC+3 (TRT)

Andaç (Kurdish: Elemûna; Syriac: Halmūn) (Note: Alternatively transliterated as Halamoon, Halmon, or Alamun.) is a village in the Uludere District of Şırnak Province in Turkey. The village is populated by Kurds from the Kaşuran tribe and had a population of 3,386 in 2023.

The hamlets of Arslanlı (Şivrezan) and Yarma (Gelemus, Geramûsa) are attached to Andaç.

== History ==
Halmūn (today called Andaç) was historically inhabited by Assyrian people and located in the Lower Tyari district in the Hakkari region. It is identified with the village of Halmon recorded in the diocese of Beth Nuhadra. It had one church and was served as part of the diocese of the Patriarch of the Church of the East. According to the English missionary George Percy Badger, the village was inhabited by 50 Assyrian families in 1850, all of whom belonged to the Church of the East and were served by two priests. By 1877, the village's population had grown to 60 families with one priest when visited by Edward Lewes Cutts. Halmūn was destroyed by the Ottoman Army in June 1915 amidst the Sayfo. Survivors were later resettled at Cham Sus in Iraq.

== Population ==
Population history from 2007 to 2023:

Population
Year	Pop.	±%
2007	2,504	—
2010	2,797	+11.7%
2015	3,763	+34.5%
2020	2,639	−29.9%
2023	3,386	+28.3%

== Bibliography ==
- Aboona, Hirmis (2008). Assyrians, Kurds, and Ottomans: Intercommunal Relations on the Periphery of the Ottoman Empire. Cambria Press.
- Badger, George Percy (1852). The Nestorians and Their Rituals: With the Narrative of a Mission to Mesopotamia and Coordistan in 1842-1844, and of a Late Visit to Those Countries in 1850; Also, Researches Into the Present Condition of the Syrian Jacobites, Papal Syrians, and Chaldeans, and an Inquiry Into the Religious Tenets of the Yezeedees. Vol. 1.
- Baz, Ibrahim (2016). Şırnak aşiretleri ve kültürü (in Turkish). ISBN 9786058849631.
- Stafford, Ronald Sempill (1935). The Tragedy of the Assyrians (PDF).
- Wilmshurst, David (2000). The Ecclesiastical Organisation of the Church of the East, 1318–1913 (PDF). Peeters Publishers.
- Yacoub, Joseph (2016). Year of the Sword: The Assyrian Christian Genocide, A History. Translated by James Ferguson. Oxford University Press.
