= Hilal, Uludere =

Municipality in Şırnak Province, Turkey

Hilal
- Municipality
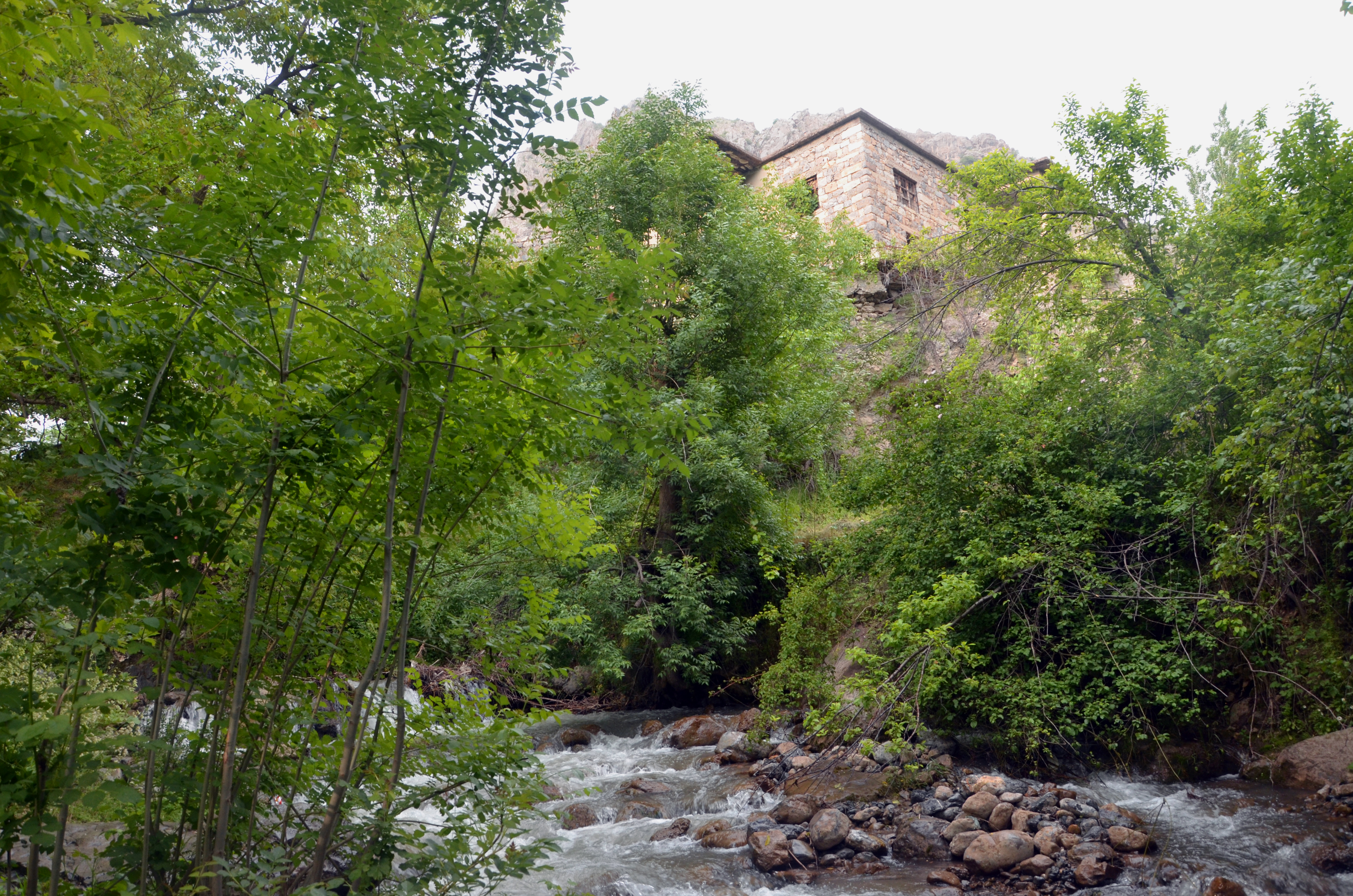

- Location within Turkey
- Coordinates: 37.448°N 42.755°E
- Country: Turkey
- Province: Şırnak
- District: Uludere
- Population (2023): 3,321
- Time zone: UTC+3 (TRT)

Hilal (Kurdish: Şêxan) is a town (belde) and municipality in the Uludere District of Şırnak Province in Turkey. It is populated by Kurds of the Goyan tribe and had a population of 3,321 in 2023.

== Population ==
Population history from 2007 to 2023:

Population
Year	Pop.	±%
2007	2,296	—
2010	2,146	−6.5%
2015	3,368	+56.9%
2020	5,107	+51.6%
2023	3,321	−35.0%

== Notable people ==
- Emine Kara
