= Ballı, Uludere =

Village in Şırnak Province, Turkey

Ballı
- Village
- Location within Turkey
- Coordinates: 37.410°N 42.840°E
- Country: Turkey
- Province: Şırnak
- District: Uludere
- Population (2023): 824
- Time zone: UTC+3 (TRT)

Ballı (Kurdish: Şiwêt) is a village in the Uludere District of Şırnak Province in Turkey. The village is populated by Kurds of the Goyan tribe and had a population of 824 in 2023.

== Population ==
Population history from 2007 to 2023:

Population
Year	Pop.	±%
2007	264	—
2010	270	+2.3%
2015	551	+104.1%
2020	674	+22.3%
2023	824	+22.3%
