= Uzungeçit, Uludere =

Municipality in Şırnak Province, Turkey

Uzungeçit
- Municipality
- Location in Turkey
- Coordinates: 37.494°N 42.993°E
- Country: Turkey
- Province: Şırnak
- District: Uludere
- Population (2023): 3,312
- Time zone: UTC+3 (TRT)

Uzungeçit (Kurdish: Dêra Hînê) is a town (belde) in the Uludere District of Şırnak Province in Turkey. It is populated by Kurds of the Goyan tribe and had a population of 3,312 in 2023.

== Population ==
Population history from 2007 to 2023:

Population
Year	Pop.	±%
2007	4,122	—
2010	2,785	−32.4%
2015	2,786	+0.0%
2020	5,235	+87.9%
2023	3,312	−36.7%
