= Delal Bridge =

Delal Pira Delal
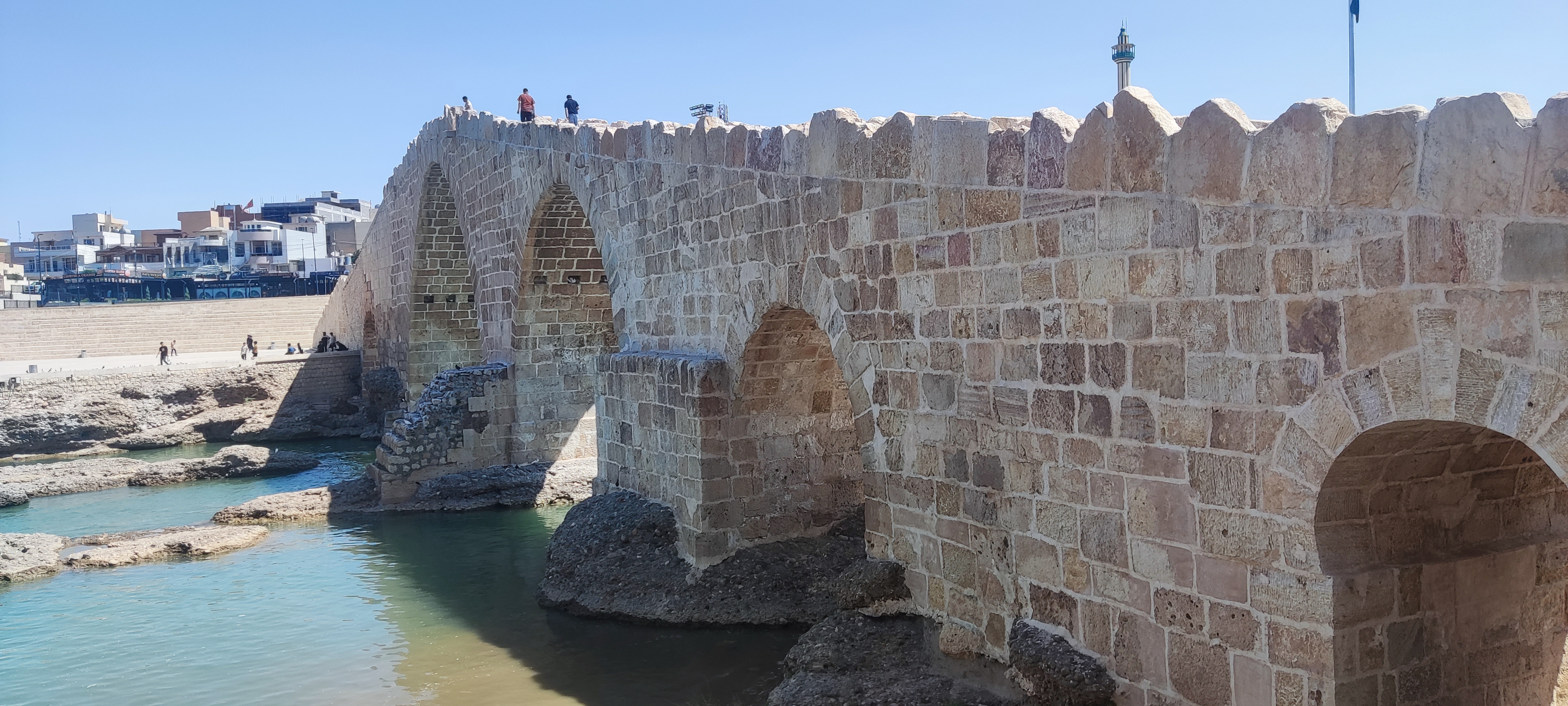
- Delal Bridge in 2025
- Coordinates: 37°08′10″N 42°41′42″E
- Crosses: Little Khabur
- Official name: Pira Delal

Characteristics
- Material: Carved limestone
- Total length: 115 meters
- Width: 5 meters
- Height: max. 16 meters
- No. of spans: 5

Statistics
- Toll: Free

Location
- Interactive map of Delal

Delal, Zakho Bridge, Pira Delal or Pirdí Delal ("The Bridge Delal" in Kurdish), informally known also as Pira Berî, is an ancient stone bridge over the Khabur river in the town of Zakho, in the Kurdistan Region of Iraq. The bridge is about 115 metres long and 16 metres high.

== Etymology ==
The term pir means "bridge" and delal means "dear or beautiful" in Kurdish, "Pira Delal" means "beautiful bridge" (though not in an aesthetic sense, but more of something that is unique). The name reflects the way the bridge is seen among the local people as well as tourists. The bridge was named Delal and the city of Zakho is called Zakhoka Delal (Delal's Zakho) in the honor of Delal, a heroine figure associated with a myth regarding the origins of the bridge (see below).

== History ==
Pira Delal is believed to have been first built during the Roman Empire, while the present structure appears to be from the Abbasid era. Kurds from all over Kurdistan visit Pira Delal as a monument of peace and enjoyment with the family. One of the legends regarding construction of the bridge relates that the hands of the builder were amputated to ensure that the bridge would remain unique.

=== Legend ===
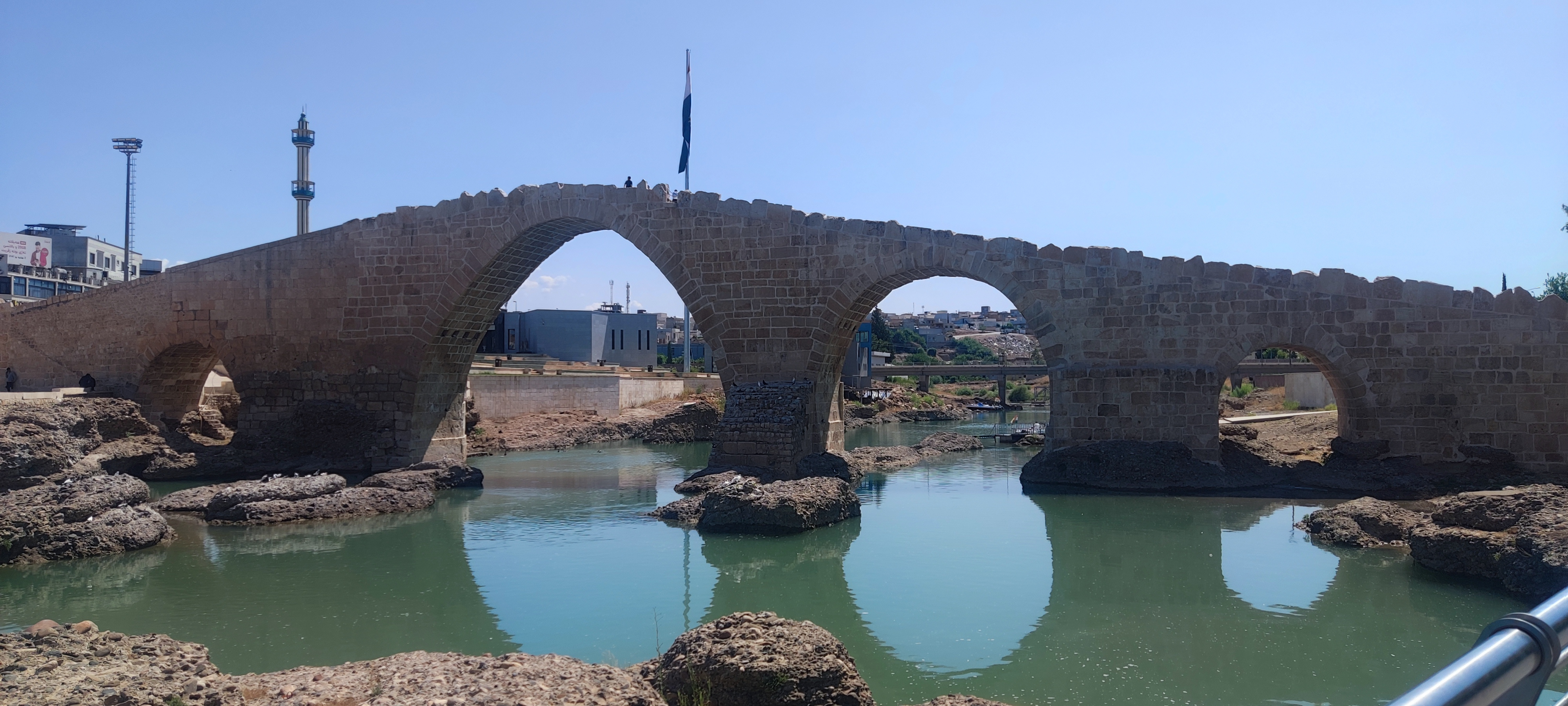
Delal Bridge's Front view

According to a common myth associated with the bridge, the prince of Bohtan had ordered a skilled constructor to build him a bridge on the Tigris river. Once the bridge was complete, the prince chopped off the right hand of the builder as a reward for the good work he had done on the bridge, and so that he may never build another bridge that was as well-crafted as anywhere else. When the builder arrived in Zakho city, the mayor of the city requested the builder to build a bridge that will connect the two sides of the Khabur river that goes to Zakho. The builder accepted the request in spite of the Bohtan prince who had cut off his right hand. When the builder got to the middle part of the bridge, it would always collapse. To solve this, one of the fortune tellers in the city notified the builder that he should bury whoever sets foot on the bridge first, man or beast, under it as a sacrifice.

A day later, the builder's niece Delal was fetching him his lunch with her dog. The builder was initially content because the dog was running in front of his niece and thus he thought that the dog will be the first to step on the bridge. However though, as soon as they approached the bridge, the dog stopped and got busy sniffing, so Delal stepped on the bridge first. As the builder saw Delal reaching the bridge first he went into shock and fainted for a brief period of time. After regaining his consciousness, the builder told Delal about the story of the bridge. Delal informed the builder that she is ready to sacrifice her life for her city. So the builder ultimately buried her under the bridge. When Delal's husband arrived to the city after knowing what had happened, he took a pick axe and started digging under the bridge. While he was digging, he heard his buried wife Delal's muffled voice commanding him to refrain from digging and that he is physically hurting her with his digging, declaring that she wants to keep holding this bridge together with her arms and to stay there for all eternity. He eventually ceased and accepted her fate.

== Cultural significance ==
The Delal Bridge holds an important place in Assyrian cultural memory through its connection to the traditional Assyrian folk song “Dalaleh” (also spelled Dalale, Dalali, or Dalaliyeh). The song is widely performed within the global Assyrian community and is often understood to reference the bridge as a symbol of beauty, endurance, and emotional longing in northern Mesopotamia. “Dalaleh” has been sung for generations at weddings, festivals, and communal celebrations, with many versions expressing themes of love, homesickness, and connection to ancestral landscapes. Its continued performance in the modern Assyrian diaspora—alongside landmarks such as Zakho, the Khabur River, and historic Mesopotamian trade regions—has strengthened the cultural association between the bridge and Assyrian musical heritage. Contemporary performers and community organizations further preserve “Dalaleh” through recordings, dance traditions, and cultural events, reinforcing the bridge's significance within Assyrian identity.

Since then the inhabitants would grow two lengthy plants in one of the gaps between the stones on one side of the bridge, and would think of them as Delal's hair braids.

== See also ==
- List of Roman bridges
