= Ortaköy, Uludere =

Village in Şırnak Province, Turkey

Ortaköy
- Village
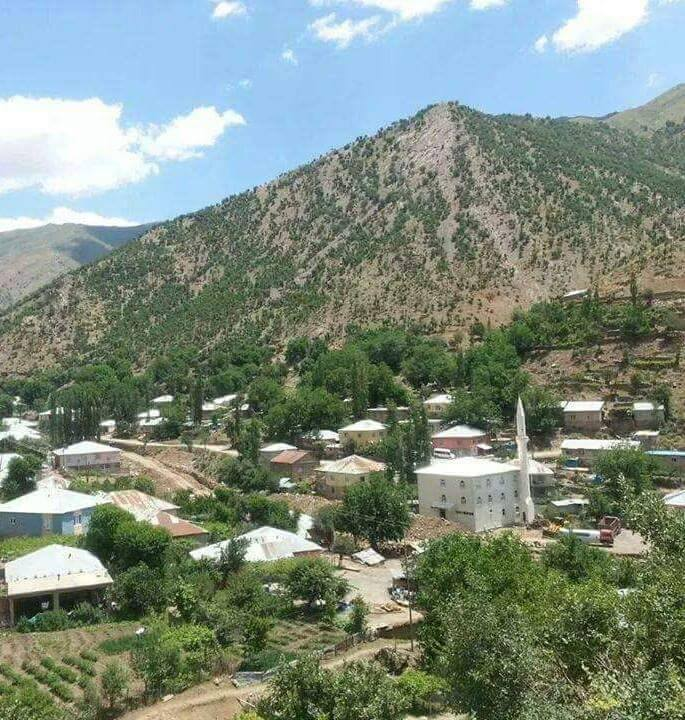
- Village

- Location within Turkey
- Coordinates: 37.327°N 43.280°E
- Country: Turkey
- Province: Şırnak
- District: Uludere
- Population (2023): 907
- Time zone: UTC+3 (TRT)

Ortaköy (Kurdish: Oriş; Syriac: Ārōsh) is a village in the Uludere District in Şırnak province, Turkey. The village is populated by Kurds of the Kaşuran tribe and had a population of 907 in 2023.

== History ==
Ārōsh (today called Ortaköy) was historically inhabited by Assyrian people and located in the Lower Tyari district in the Hakkari region. According to the English missionary George Percy Badger, the village was inhabited by 17 Assyrian families in 1850, all of whom belonged to the Church of the East; this grew to 20 families in 1877 when visited by Edward Lewes Cutts, by which time a church had also been built. Ārōsh was served as part of the diocese of the Patriarch of the Church of the East. The village was destroyed by the Ottoman Army in June 1915 amidst the Sayfo.

== Population ==
Population history from 2007 to 2023:

Population
Year	Pop.	±%
2007	1,087	—
2010	1,180	+8.6%
2015	1,185	+0.4%
2020	919	−22.4%
2023	907	−1.3%

== Bibliography ==
- Aboona, Hirmis (2008). Assyrians, Kurds, and Ottomans: Intercommunal Relations on the Periphery of the Ottoman Empire. Cambria Press.
- Baz, Ibrahim (2016). Şırnak aşiretleri ve kültürü (in Turkish). p. 104. ISBN 9786058849631.
- Wilmshurst, David (2000). The Ecclesiastical Organisation of the Church of the East, 1318–1913. Peeters Publishers.
- Yacoub, Joseph (2016). Year of the Sword: The Assyrian Christian Genocide, A History. Translated by James Ferguson. Oxford University Press.
