= Taşdelen, Uludere =

Village in Şırnak Province, Turkey

Taşdelen
- Village
- Location within Turkey
- Coordinates: 37.393°N 42.857°E
- Country: Turkey
- Province: Şırnak
- District: Uludere
- Population (2023): 1,525
- Time zone: UTC+3 (TRT)

Taşdelen (Kurdish: Nerweh) is a village in the Uludere District of Şırnak Province in Turkey. The village is populated by Kurds of the Goyan tribe and had a population of 1,525 in 2023.

The hamlet of Kayadibi (Alos) is attached to Taşdelen.

== Population ==
Population history from 2007 to 2023:

Population
Year	Pop.	±%
2007	987	—
2010	1,294	+31.1%
2015	1,574	+21.6%
2020	1,556	−1.1%
2023	1,525	−2.0%
