= Little Khabur =

Little Khabur Habur water, Habur Suyu, Khabir
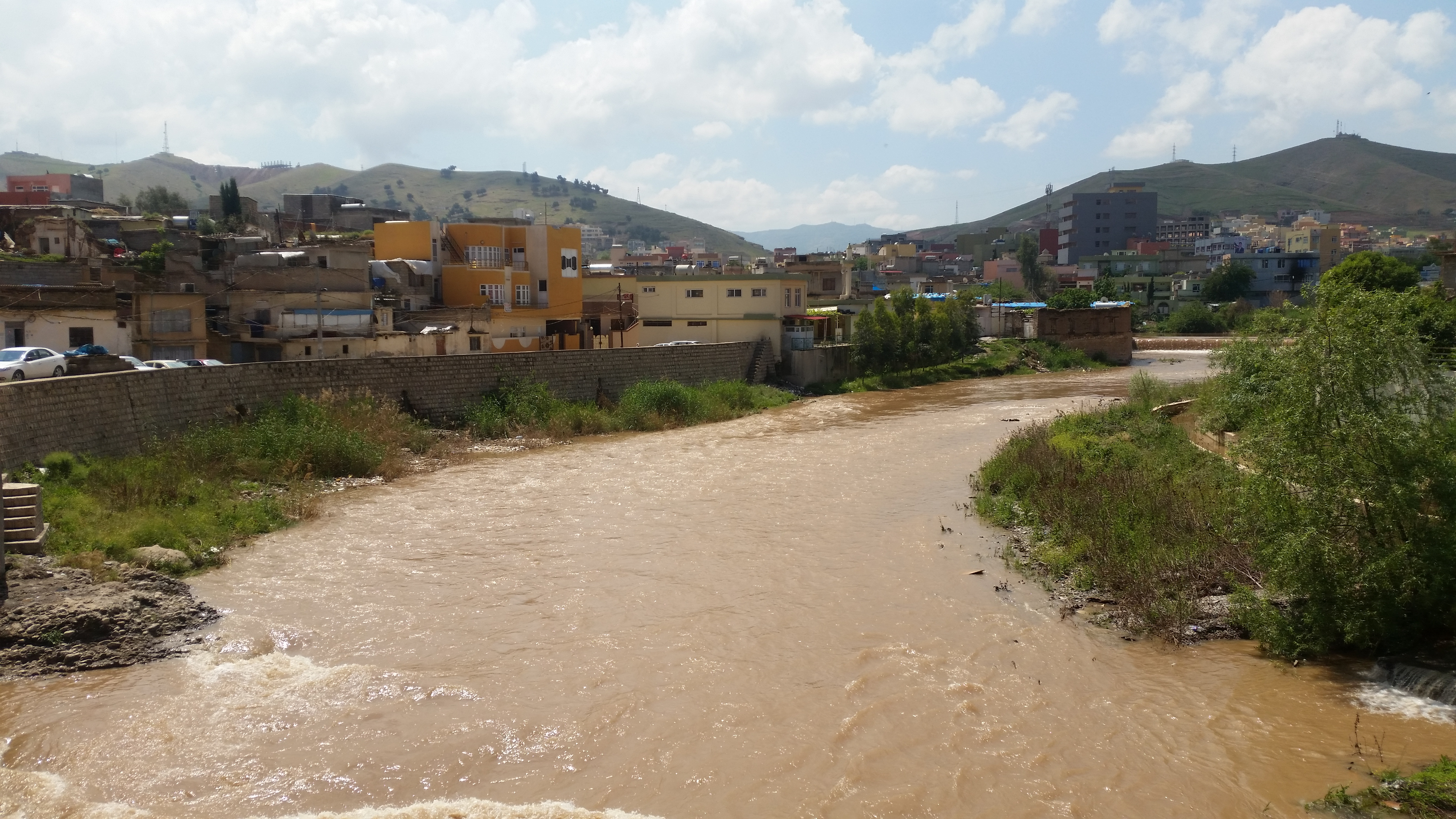
- The Little Khabur flowing through Zakho.

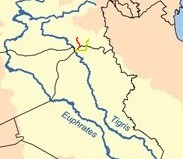
- Approximate position of the Little Khabur river (green line) and its main tributary the Hezil Suyu river (red line)

Location
- Country: Turkey, Iraq
- Region: Eastern Anatolia region, Iraqi Kurdistan
- District: Uludere, Zakho District
- City: Zakho

Physical characteristics
- Source
  - location: Uludere district, Şırnak Province, Turkey
  - coordinates: 37°30′49.23″N 43°7′6.03″E
- Mouth: Tigris
  - location: near Faysh Khabur, Iraq-Syria-Turkey
  - coordinates: 37°6′9.47″N 42°21′10.12″E
  - elevation: 350 m (1,150 ft)

Basin features
- Tributaries
  - right: Hezil Suyu

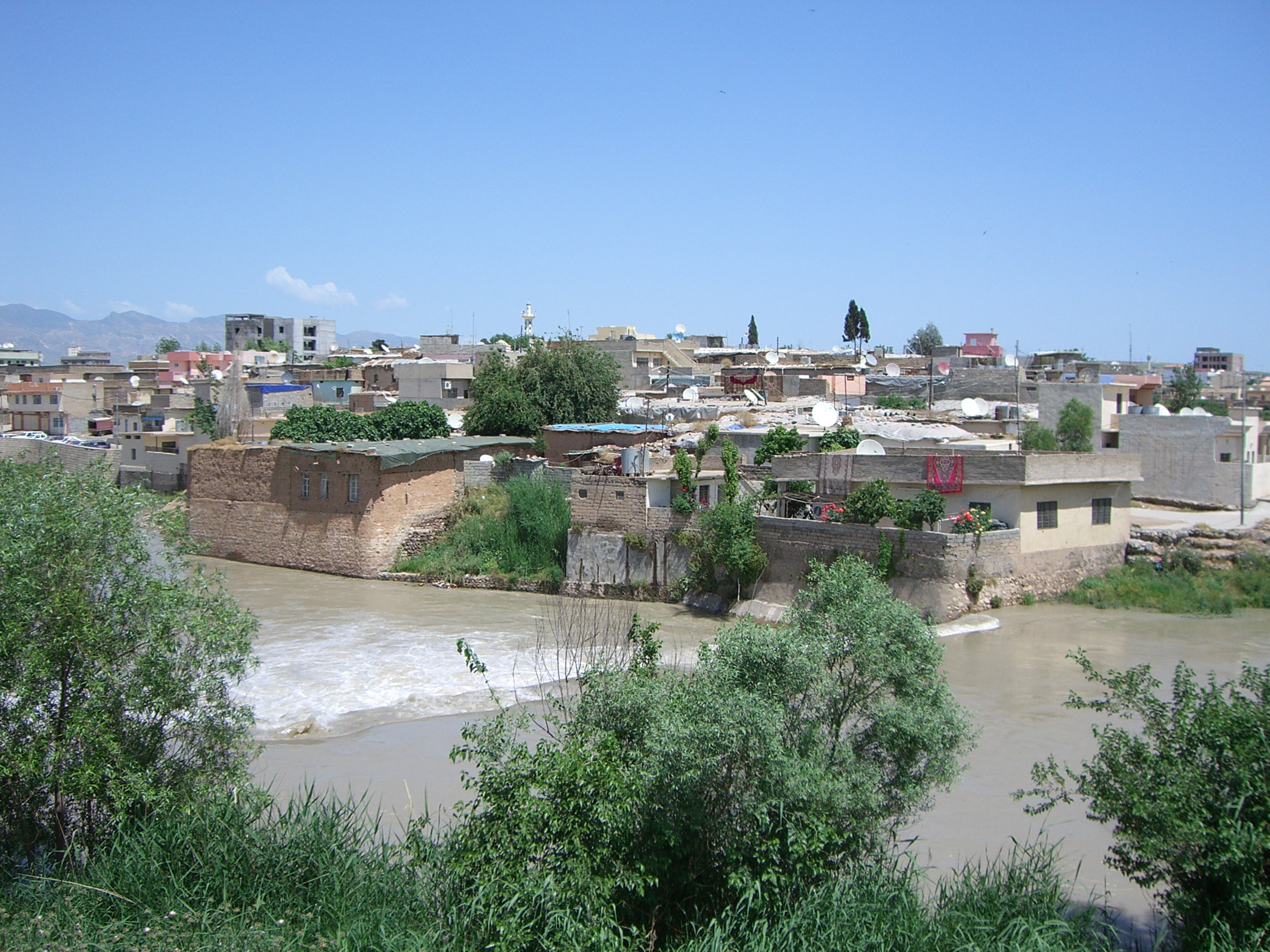
Khabur River flowing by the city of Zakho

The Little Khabur (Turkish: Habur, Khabir or Habur Suyu (Habur Water), Kurdish: Xabûr, Ava Xabûr or Xabîr) is a river that rises in Turkey and flows through Iraq to join the Tigris at the tripoint of Turkey, Iraq and Syria.

The river originates in the Uludere District in Turkey and emerges from a number of small rivers flowing off the Taurus Mountains, to the south-east of Hakkâri. From there, it generally flows south, crossing the Turkish-Iraqi border into Iraqi Kurdistan before turning west toward the Tigris. Zakho is an important town along the river, where the ancient Delal Bridge crosses the river. A few kilometres west of Zakho, the Little Khabur is joined by its main tributary the Hezil Suyu (or Nizil river or Hezil Çayı), which forms part of the border between Iraq and Turkey. From there onward the Little Khabur river forms the border for around 20 km to the Tigris and is also called (and often mistaken with) the Hezil Suyu.

It might have been the Zerbis mentioned by Pliny the Elder.

== See also ==
- List of international border rivers
