= Sanat, Iraq =

Sanat
- Interactive map of Sanat
- Location in Iraq Sanat (Iraqi Kurdistan)
- Coordinates: 37°21′15.1″N 42°47′16.4″E
- Country: Iraq
- Region: Kurdistan Region
- Governorate: Duhok Governorate
- Time zone: UTC+3 (AST)
- ISO 3166 code: IQ

Sanat is a village located in the Dohuk Governorate, Kurdistan Region, Iraq. It is situated in the Dohuk district of the Kurdistan Region.

== History ==
In 1913, the village of Sanat (Asnakh) was home to 600 Chaldean Catholics. In 1976 the village was destroyed by Iraq's central government.

As of 2017 village was uninhabited but had a PKK militant presence.
