= Bağlı, Uludere =

Village in Şırnak Province, Turkey

Bağlı
- Village
- Location within Turkey
- Coordinates: 37.426°N 42.820°E
- Country: Turkey
- Province: Şırnak
- District: Uludere
- Population (2023): 372
- Time zone: UTC+3 (TRT)

Bağlı (Kurdish: Kulgi) is a village in the Uludere District of Şırnak Province in Turkey. The village is populated by Kurds of the Goyan tribe and had a population of 372 in 2023.

== Population ==
Population history from 2007 to 2023:

Population
Year	Pop.	±%
2007	79	—
2010	123	+55.7%
2015	280	+127.6%
2020	295	+5.4%
2023	372	+26.1%
