= Işıkveren, Uludere =

Village in Şırnak Province, Turkey

Işıkveren
- Village
- Location within Turkey
- Coordinates: 37.382°N 42.838°E
- Country: Turkey
- Province: Şırnak
- District: Uludere
- Population (2023): 295
- Time zone: UTC+3 (TRT)

Işıkveren (Kurdish: Bîleh) is a village in the Uludere District of Şırnak Province in Turkey. The village is populated by Kurds of the Goyan tribe and had a population of 295 in 2023.

== Population ==
Population history from 2007 to 2023:

Population
| Year | Pop. | ±% |
|---|---|---|
| 2007 | 121 | — |
| 2010 | 171 | +41.3% |
| 2015 | 490 | +186.5% |
| 2020 | 320 | −34.7% |
| 2023 | 295 | −7.8% |
