= Ortasu, Uludere =

Village in Şırnak Province, Turkey

Ortasu
- Village
- Location within Turkey
- Coordinates: 37.368°N 42.958°E
- Country: Turkey
- Province: Şırnak
- District: Uludere
- Population (2023): 1,237
- Time zone: UTC+3 (TRT)

Ortasu (Kurdish: Robozik) is a village in the Uludere District of Şırnak Province in Turkey. The village is populated by Kurds of the Goyan and Sindî Kurdish tribes and had a population of 1,237 in 2023.

The hamlets of Alancık and Tarlabaşı are attached to Ortasu.

== Population ==
Population history from 2007 to 2023:

Population
Year	Pop.	±%
2007	873	—
2010	954	+9.3%
2015	1,285	+34.7%
2020	1,038	−19.2%
2023	1,237	+19.2%

== See also ==
- Roboski massacre
