= İnceler, Uludere =

Village in Şırnak Province, Turkey

İnceler
- Village
- Location within Turkey
- Coordinates: 37.429°N 42.793°E
- Country: Turkey
- Province: Şırnak
- District: Uludere
- Population (2023): 874
- Time zone: UTC+3 (TRT)

İnceler (Kurdish: Ziravik) is a village in the Uludere District of Şırnak Province in Turkey. The village is populated by Kurds of the Goyan tribe and had a population of 874 in 2023.

== Population ==
Population history from 2007 to 2023:

Population
Year	Pop.	±%
2007	265	—
2010	409	+54.3%
2015	773	+89.0%
2020	843	+9.1%
2023	874	+3.7%
