= Uludere District =

District in Şırnak Province, Turkey

- District
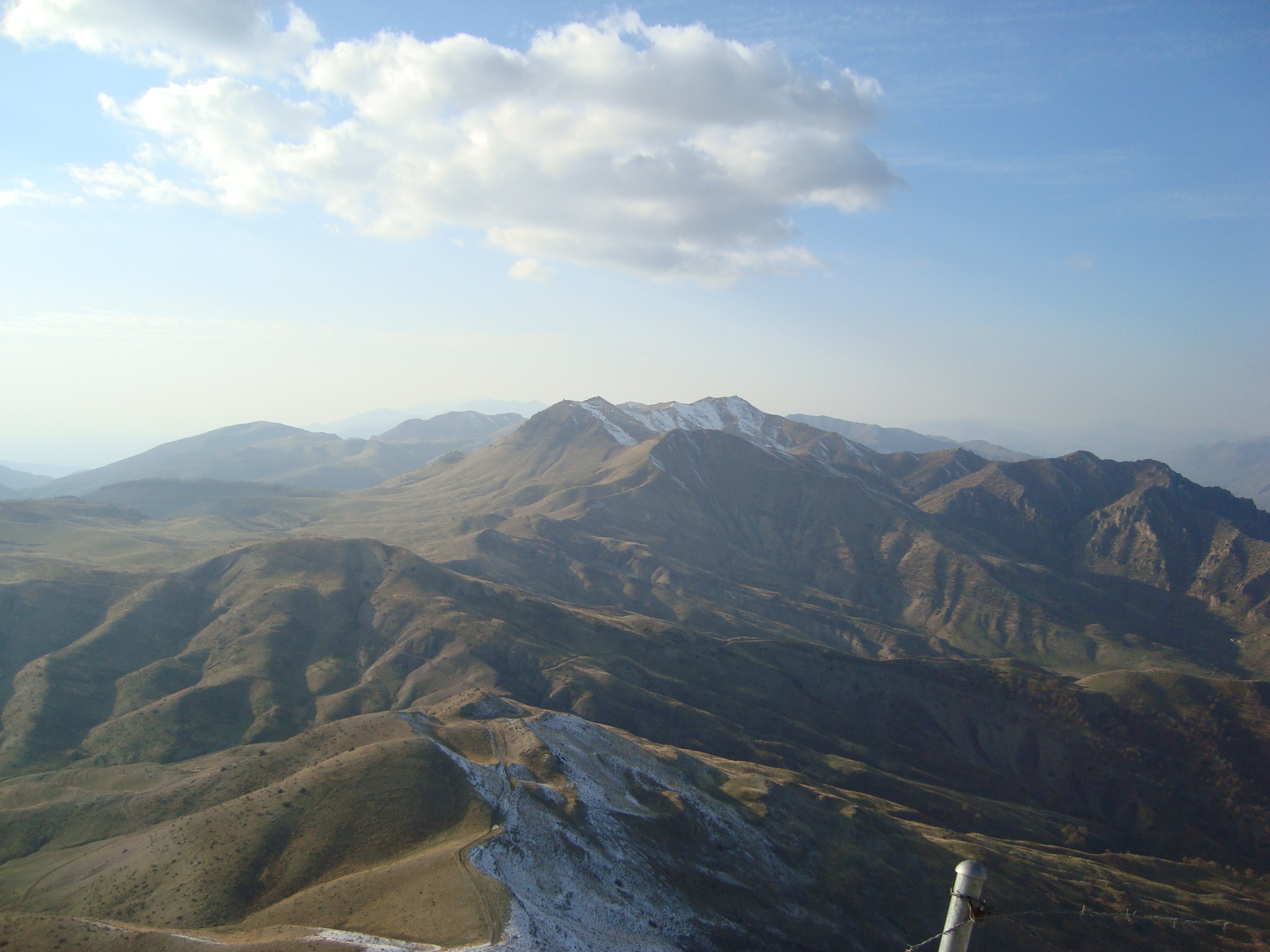

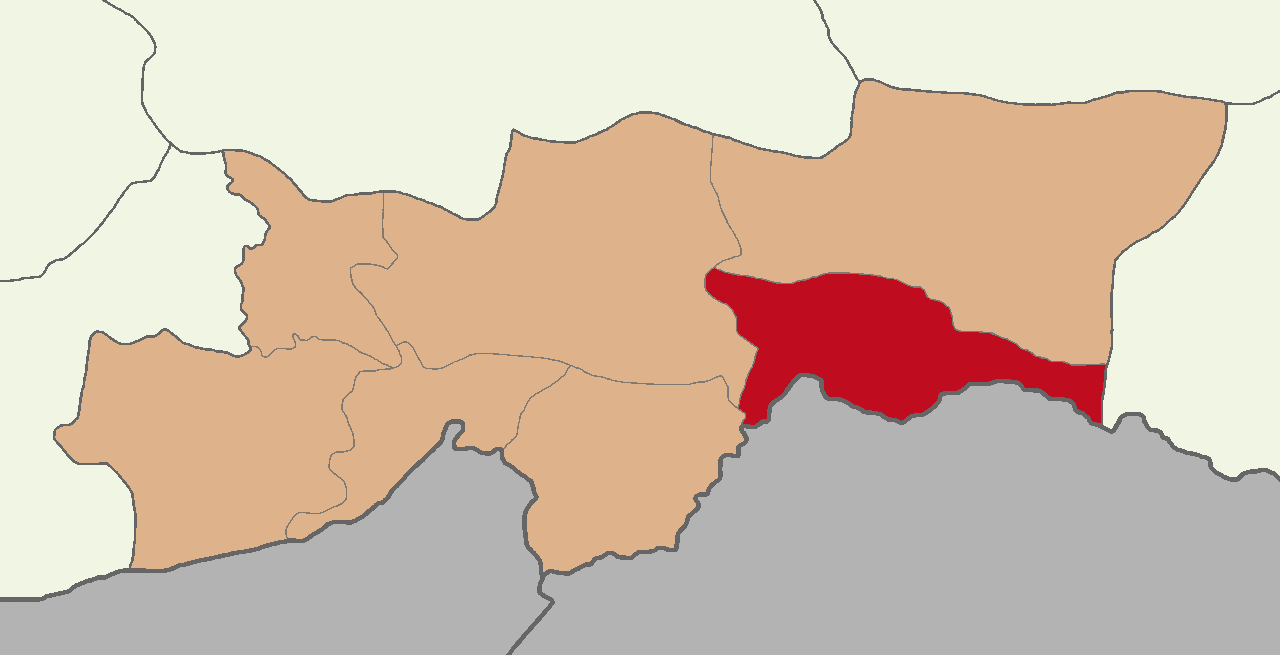
- Map showing Uludere District in Şırnak Province

- Location within Turkey
- Coordinates: 37°25′N 42°58′E
- Country: Turkey
- Province: Şırnak
- Seat: Uludere
- Area: 841 km^{2} (325 sq mi)
- Population (2023): 46,740
  - Density: 55.6/km^{2} (144/sq mi)
- Time zone: UTC+3 (TRT)

Uludere District (Kurdish: Qileban) is a district of the Şırnak Province of Turkey. In 2023, the district had a population of 46,740. The seat of the district is the town of Uludere. Its area is 841 km^{2}.

The district was formed in 1957.

Around 90% of the district is populated by Kurds from the Goyan tribe. The Kaşuran tribe also reside in the district.

== Settlements ==
Uludere District contains four beldes, seventeen villages of which two are unpopulated and moreover seven hamlets.

=== Municipalities ===
1. Hilal (Şêxan)
2. Şenoba (Sêgirik)
3. Uludere
4. Uzungeçit (Dêra Hînê)

=== Villages ===
1. Akduman (Mîjîn)
2. Andaç (Elemûna)
3. Bağlı (Kulgi)
4. Bağlıca (Kudin)
5. Ballı (Şiwêt)
6. Bulakbaşı (Nîreh)
7. Dağdibi (Hedrîn)
8. Doğan (Bazyan)
9. Gülyazı (Bujeh)
10. Işıkveren (Bîleh)
11. İnceler (Ziravik)
12. Onbudak (ܐܫܝ (Ischy, Eschy), Şê)
13. Ortabağ (Kirur)
14. Ortaköy (Oriş)
15. Ortasu (Roboskî)
16. Taşdelen (Nerweh)
17. Yemişli (Mergeh)

== Population ==
Population history from 2007 to 2023:

Population
Year	Pop.	±%
2007	37,894	—
2010	34,518	−8.9%
2015	42,386	+22.8%
2020	45,515	+7.4%
2023	46,740	+2.7%

== Geography ==
Uludere's neighbors are: the district of Çukurca in the province of Hakkâri to the east; the districts of Şırnak and Silopi to the west; the district of Beytüşşebap to the north; and the Iraqi Kurdistan Region to the south.

The topography of Uludere consists mostly of rugged mountainous terrain. The Haftanîn and Kêla Meme (Kel Mehmet) mountains are the highest mountains in Uludere. In addition, Suwar, Serhe, Haftanîn, Meydan, Elcan and Şirîş are important plateaus. The altitude varies between 800 meters and 3200 meters throughout the district. The lowest altitude is in the Şenoba town and the highest altitude is in the Kel Mehmet (Kêla Meme) mountain.
