= Gülyazı, Uludere =

Village in Şırnak Province, Turkey

Gülyazı
- Village
- Location within Turkey
- Coordinates: 37.393°N 42.992°E
- Country: Turkey
- Province: Şırnak
- District: Uludere
- Population (2023): 3,907
- Time zone: UTC+3 (TRT)

Gülyazı (Kurdish: Bujeh) is a village in the Uludere District of Şırnak Province in Turkey. The village is populated by Kurds of the Goyan and Sindî tribes and had a population of 3,907 in 2023.

== Population ==
Population history from 2007 to 2023:

Population
Year	Pop.	±%
2007	2,567	—
2010	2,807	+9.3%
2015	3,876	+38.1%
2020	2,562	−33.9%
2023	3,907	+52.5%

== Notable people ==
- Ferhat Encü
