= Uludere =

- Municipality
- Location within Turkey
- Coordinates: 37.446°N 42.852°E
- Country: Turkey
- Province: Şırnak
- District: Uludere

Government
  - Mayor: Sait Ürek (AKP)
- Population (2023): 12,068
- Time zone: UTC+3 (TRT)

Uludere (Kurdish: Qileban) is a town and the seat of the Uludere District in the Şırnak Province of Turkey. The town is populated by Kurds of the Goyan tribe and had a population of 12,068 in 2023.

Its mayor is Sait Ürek from the party AKP.

== Neighborhoods ==
Uludere is divided into the six neighborhoods of Gündoğdu, Kılaban, Küçükçay, Ödül, Özelli and Yeşilova.

== Population ==
Population history from 2007 to 2023:

Population
Year	Pop.	±%
2007	9,228	—
2010	7,326	−20.6%
2015	7,107	−3.0%
2020	9,634	+35.6%
2023	12,068	+25.3%
