= Hezil Suyu =

Hezil Suyu Hezil Çayı, Nizil, Nahr al-Hayzal, نهر الهيزل
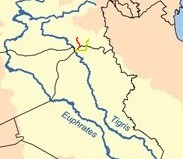
- Approximate position of the Hezil Suyu river (red line) tributary of the Little Khabur river (green line).

Location
- Country: Turkey
- Region: Şırnak Province

Physical characteristics
- Source
  - location: Şırnak Province
- Mouth: Tigris
  - location: Turkey
  - coordinates: 37°9′0.45″N 42°34′45.54″E
  - elevation: 390 m (1,280 ft)
- Hezil Suyu river is not to be mistaken with the Little Khabur river

The Hezil Suyu (Arabic: نهر الهيزل Kurdish: Çemê Hizil River Hizil, Nahr al-Hayzal, or Hezil Çayı or the Nizil river, in Turkish language suyu means water of) is a river in south-eastern Turkey in the Eastern Anatolia region which flows entirely in the Şırnak Province and is part of the natural border between Turkey and the Kurdistan region of Iraq. Just before it forms the border, it is dammed by the Silopi Dam. Just west of the city of Zakho. it joins the Little Khabur river, which then forms the border.

The Hezil Suyu river is not to be mistaken with the Little Khabur river which is a tributary to the Tigris river and flows east of Zakho city and goes through the Zakho city joining its tributary the Hezil Suyu west of Zakho city.
