= Roller-compacted concrete =

Concrete blend used in dam construction

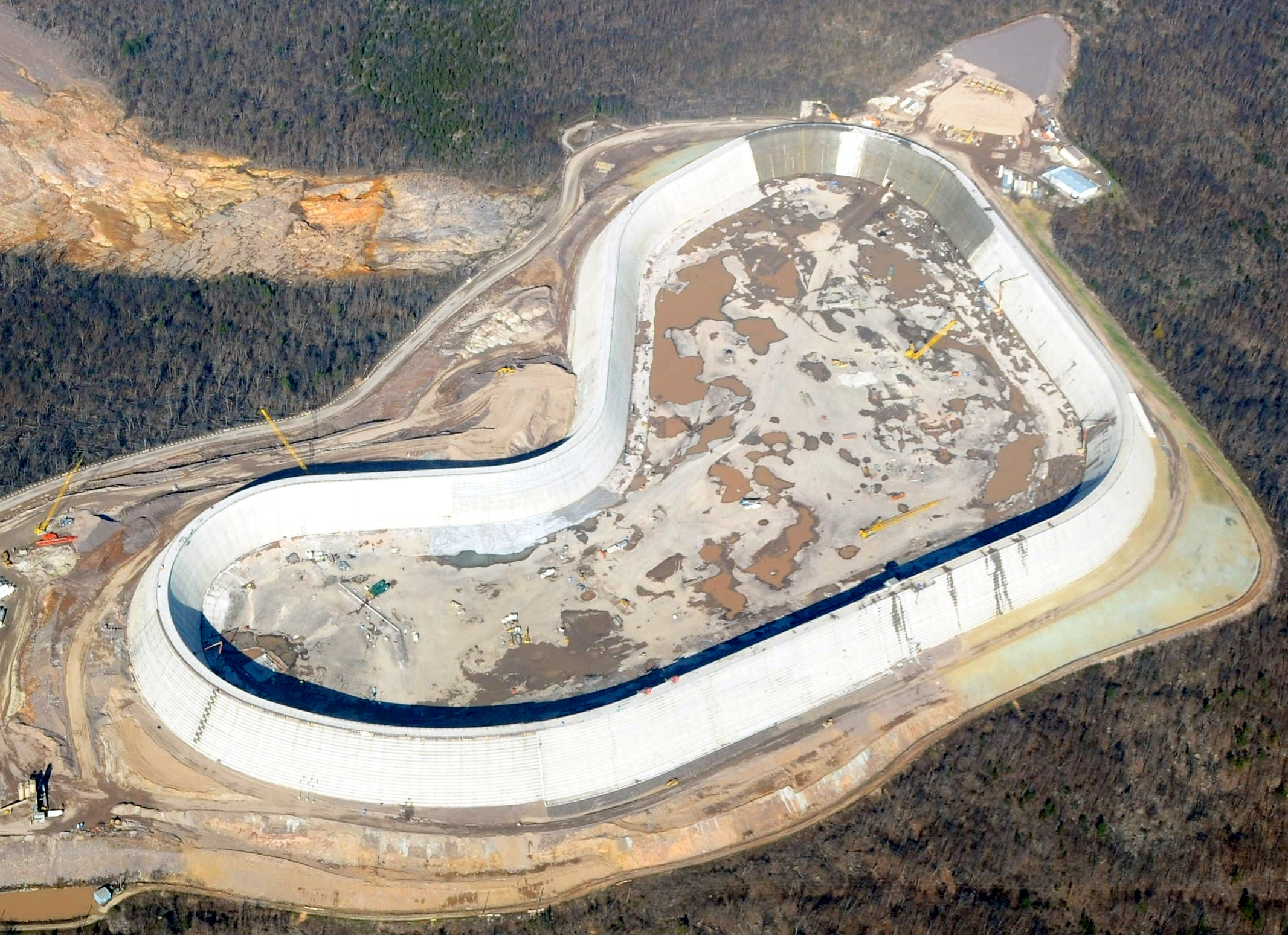
The rebuilt upper reservoir of the Taum Sauk plant, nearing completion in this photo, is the largest RCC dam in North America.

Roller-compacted concrete (RCC) or rolled concrete (rollcrete) is a special blend of concrete that has essentially the same ingredients as conventional concrete but in different ratios, and increasingly with partial substitution of fly ash for portland cement. The partial substitution of fly ash for Portland Cement is an important aspect of RCC dam construction because the heat generated by fly ash hydration is significantly less than the heat generated by portland cement hydration. This in turn reduces the thermal loads on the concrete and reduces the potential for thermal cracking to occur. RCC is a mix of cement/fly ash, water, sand, aggregate and common additives, but contains much less water. The produced mix is drier and essentially has no slump. RCC is placed in a manner similar to road paving; the material is delivered by dump trucks or conveyors, spread by small bulldozers or specially modified asphalt pavers, and then compacted by vibratory rollers.

In dam construction, roller-compacted concrete began its initial development with the construction of the Alpe Gera Dam near Sondrio in North Italy between 1961 and 1964. Concrete was laid in a similar form and method but not rolled. RCC had been touted in engineering journals during the 1970s as a revolutionary material suitable for, among other things, dam construction. Initially and generally, RCC was used for backfill, sub-base and concrete pavement construction, but increasingly it has been used to build concrete gravity dams because the low cement content and use of fly ash cause less heat to be generated while curing than do conventional mass concrete placements. Roller-compacted concrete has many time and cost benefits over conventional mass concrete dams; these include higher rates of concrete placement, lower material costs and lower costs associated with post-cooling and formwork.

== Dam applications ==
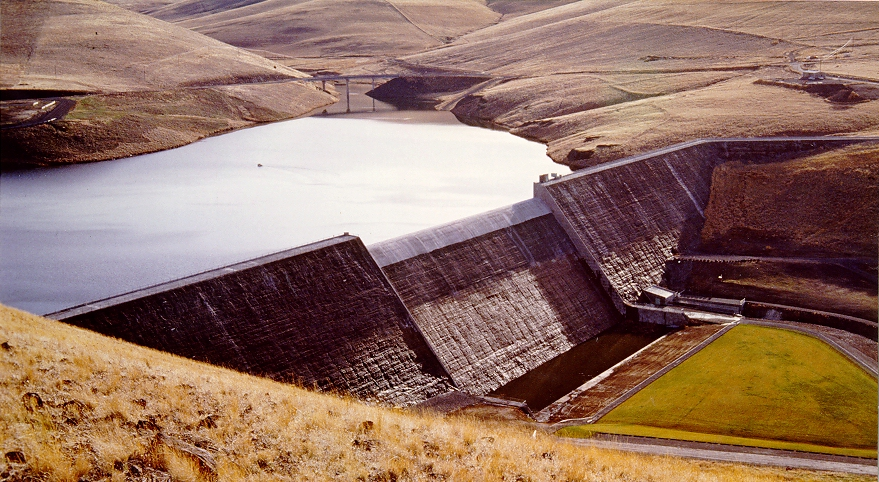
Willow Creek Dam in Oregon, US

For dam applications, RCC sections are built lift-by-lift in successive horizontal layers resulting in a downstream slope that resembles a concrete staircase. Once a layer is placed, it can immediately support the earth-moving equipment to place the next layer. After RCC is deposited on the lift surface, small dozers typically spread it in one-foot-thick (about 30 cm) layers.

The first RCC dam built in the United States was the Willow Creek Dam on Willow Creek, a tributary in Oregon of the Columbia River. It was constructed by the US Army Corps of Engineers between November 1981 and February 1983. Construction proceeded well, within a fast schedule and under budget (estimated US$50 million, actual US$35 million). On initial filling though, it was found that the leakage between the compacted layers within the dam body was unusually high. This condition was treated by traditional remedial grouting at a further cost of US$2 million, which initially reduced the leakage by nearly 75%; over the years, seepage has since decreased to less than 10% of its initial flow. Concern over the dam's long-term safety has continued however, although only indirectly related to its RCC construction. Within a few years of construction, problems were noted with stratification of the reservoir water, caused by upstream pollution and anoxic decomposition, which produced hydrogen sulfide gas. Concerns were expressed that this could in turn give rise to sulfuric acid, and thus accelerate damage to the concrete. The controversy itself, as well as its handling, continued for some years. In 2004 an aeration plant was installed to address the root cause in the reservoir, as had been suggested 18 years earlier.

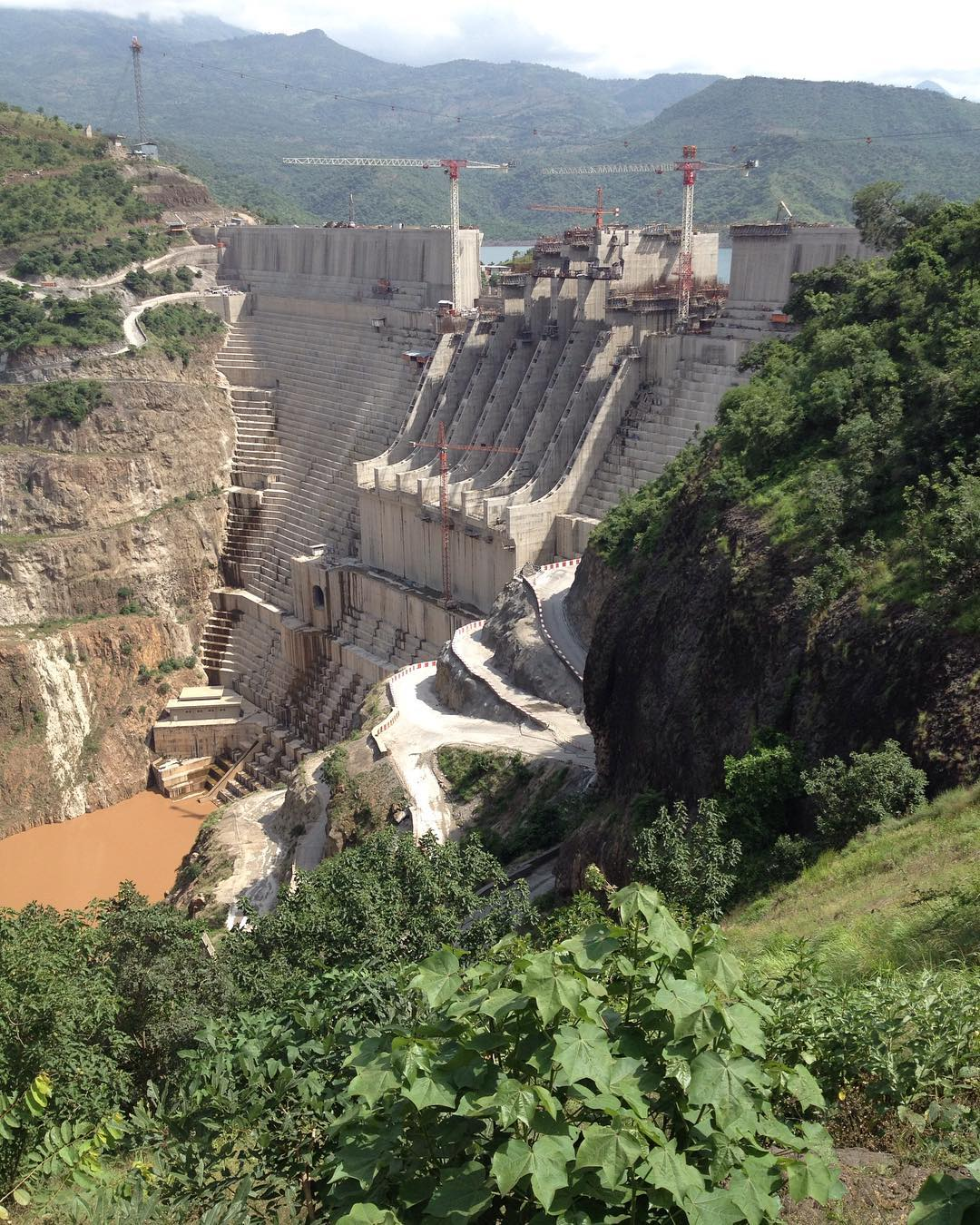
Gilgel Gibe III Dam in Ethiopia

In the quarter century following the construction of the Willow Creek Dam, considerable research and experimentation yielded many improvements in concrete mix designs, dam designs and construction methods for roller-compacted concrete dams. By 2008, about 350 RCC dams existed worldwide. As of 2018, the highest dam of this type was the Gilgel Gibe III Dam in Ethiopia, at 250 m (820 ft), with the Pakistani Diamer-Bhasha Dam under construction at 272 m (892 ft).

== Pavement applications ==
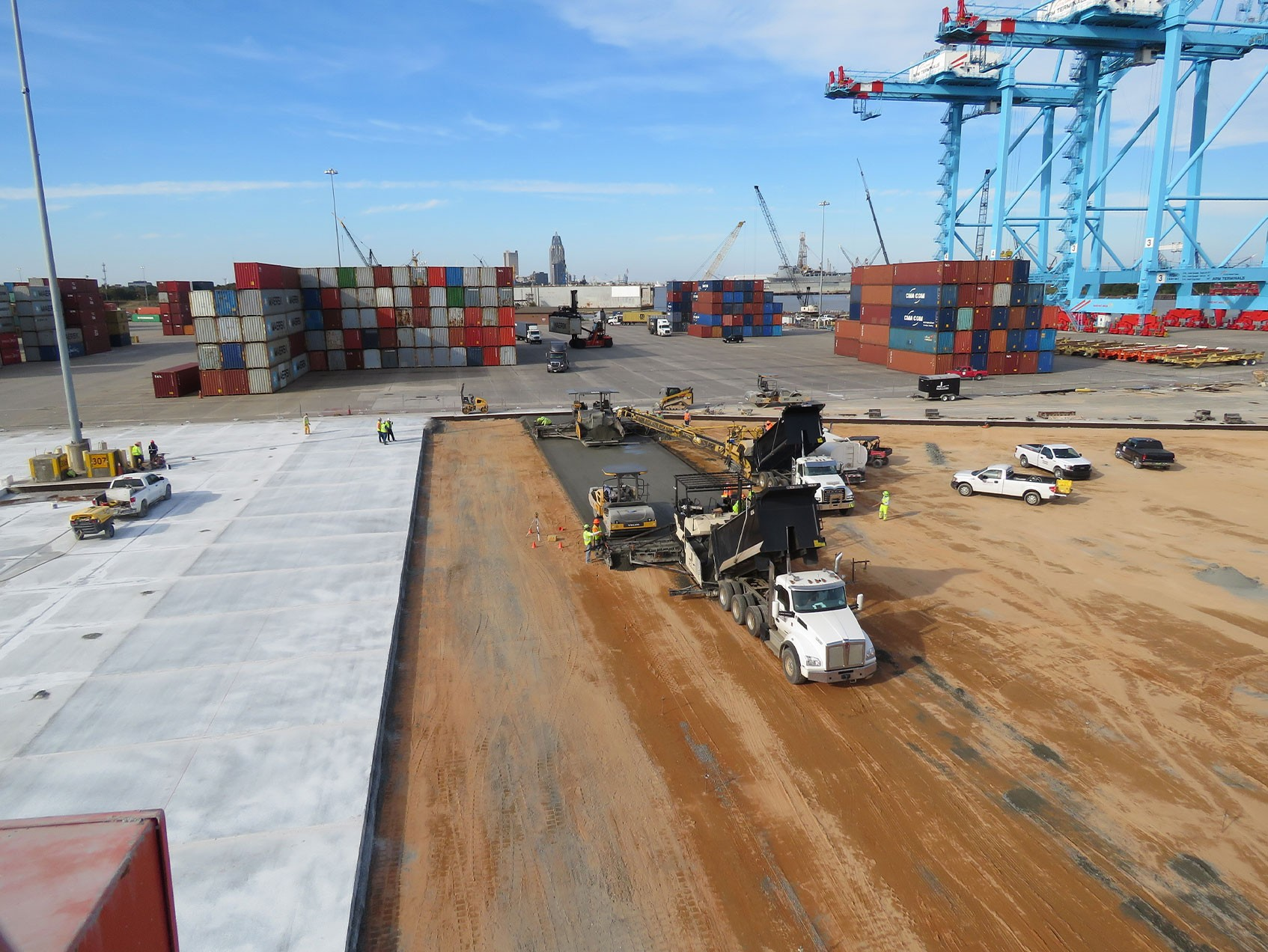
RCC placement at the Port of Mobile Terminal CY3S, Mobile, Alabama. Completed by Rollcon LLC in 2019, consisting of 847,251 SF of 18" Dual Lift RCC.

Roller-compacted concrete is widely used as a pavement material for heavy-duty industrial and municipal applications, including port facilities, intermodal terminals, distribution centers, manufacturing plants, logging yards, and road construction. RCC pavement is valued for its structural strength, durability, and resistance to heavy wheel loads. Because it requires no formwork, finishing, or dowels, construction is generally faster and less costly than conventional concrete pavement.

The RCC Pavement Council is an industry organization that promotes the use of roller-compacted concrete in pavement applications. The Council provides technical resources, design guidelines, and project specifications for RCC pavement. It also maintains a directory of qualified contractors throughout North America with experience in RCC pavement design and construction.

== See also ==
- List of roller-compacted concrete dams
- Asphalt concrete
