= Dera Shish =

- Location in Iraq Dera Shish (Iraqi Kurdistan)
- Coordinates: 37°19′36″N 42°47′58″E
- Country: Iraq
- Region: Kurdistan Region
- Governorate: Dohuk Governorate
- District: Zakho District
- Sub-district: Darkar

Dera Shish (Arabic: دئيره شيش, Kurdish: دێرشیش) (Note: Alternatively transliterated as Derashīsh, Der Shish, or Deir Shīsh.) also known as ʿŪmrā and ‘Ūmra Shghisha, is a village in Dohuk Governorate in Kurdistan Region, Iraq. It is located near the Iraq–Turkey border in the district of Zakho.

In the village, there was a church of Mar Ephrem. The Monastery of Mar Atqen was located near the village.

== History ==
The Monastery of Mar Atqen is mentioned in the 9th century Book of Chastity by Ishoʿdnaḥ. In 1913, 200 Chaldean Catholic Assyrians inhabited Dera Shish, and were served by one functioning church as part of the diocese of Zakho. In the Iraqi census of 1957, the village had a population of 361 people. A significant number of inhabitants fled as a consequence of the First Iraqi–Kurdish War in the early 1960s. Dera Shish was destroyed by the Iraqi government in 1975, displacing the remaining 50 families, and the monastery was also demolished by Iraqi soldiers during the Al-Anfal campaign in 1987.

By 2011, 8 families had returned to Dera Shish, and the Hezel Foundation had constructed 20 houses and a community hall, and developed the village's infrastructure. As of 2016, the village is inhabited by 32 Assyrians.

== Bibliography ==
- Donabed, Sargon George (2015). Reforging a Forgotten History: Iraq and the Assyrians in the Twentieth Century. Edinburgh University Press.
- Eshoo, Majed (2004). The Fate Of Assyrian Villages Annexed To Today's Dohuk Governorate In Iraq And The Conditions In These Villages Following The Establishment Of The Iraqi State In 1921 (PDF). Translated by Mary Challita.
- Wilmshurst, David (2000). The Ecclesiastical Organisation of the Church of the East, 1318–1913. Peeters Publishers.
