= Mount Shabani =

Mountain in Iraq

- Location within Iraq Location within Iraqi Kurdistan

Highest point
- Elevation: 1,300 m (4,300 ft)
- Coordinates: 37.20828°N 42.98582°E

Geography
- Country: Iraq
- Region: Kurdistan Region
- Governorate: Duhok Governorate
- District: Zakho District

Mount Shabani (Arabic: جبل شاب آب, romanized: Jabal Shāb Āb, Kurdish: Chiya-î Shabani) is located in batifa Duhok Governorate in the Kurdistan Region, Iraq.
