= Syrian nationalism =

Nationalism of the region of Syria

Flag of Syria

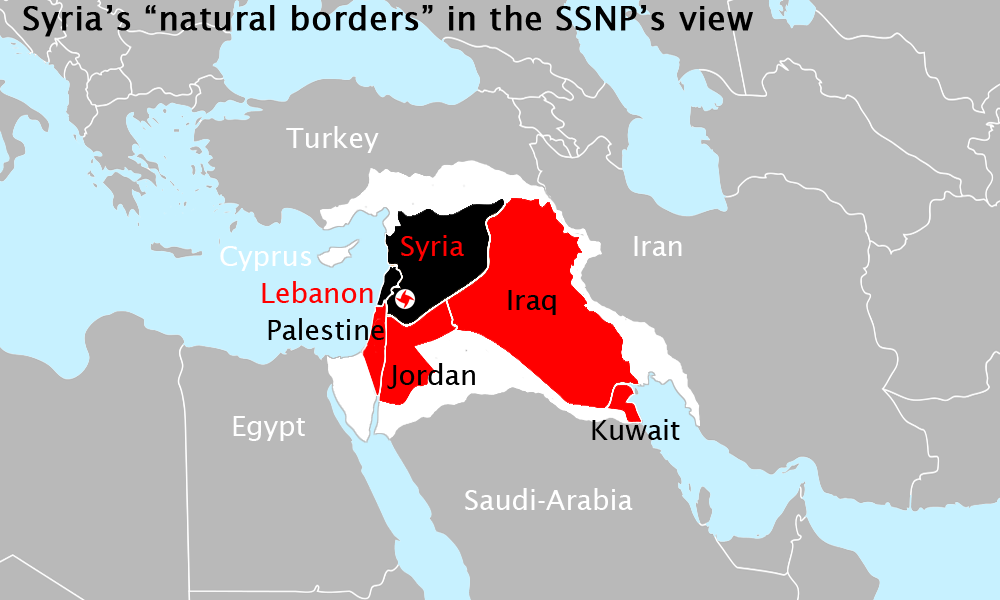
The assumed "natural borders" of Syria as claimed by the Syrian Social Nationalist Party

Syrian nationalism (Arabic: القَومِيَةُ السُورِيَّةُ, romanized: al-qawmīyah as-Sūriyyah), also known as pan-Syrian nationalism or pan-Syrianism (Arabic: الوَحْدَةُ الشَّامِيَةُ, romanized: al-waḥda ash-Shāmiyyah), refers to the nationalism of the region of Syria, as a cultural or political entity known as "Syria".

Syrian nationalism originated with the Arab Revolt against the Ottoman Empire during World War I. While most "pragmatic" Syrian nationalists advocate for Arab nationalism and view pan-Syrianism as a step toward a broader pan-Arab state, a minority of "pure" Syrian nationalists, often associated with the Syrian Social Nationalist Party, oppose this perspective. They assert that Syria should be the leading force among the Arab people and reject pan-Arabist movements that would position all Arabs on the same level.

Some Syrian opposition forces who were fighting against the Assad regime government are strong advocates of historical Syrian nationalism that hearkens back to a "Golden Age." The Free Syrian Army has incorporated symbols of nationalist insignia into their flags and military uniforms during the Syrian civil war. Syrian nationalism was historically prominent in Lebanon, where it was particularly widespread among Lebanese Sunni Muslims, who aspired to be incorporated into a Greater Syrian state.

== History ==
=== Origins ===
Syrian nationalism arose as a modern school of thought in the late 19th century, in conjunction with the Nahda movement, then sweeping the Ottoman-ruled Arab world. One of the towering historical figures in Syrian nationalism has been the Ayyubid sultan Saladin, the Sunni leader who re-captured Jerusalem and led Muslims to victory against European Crusaders. Following the Balfour declaration, Sykes-Picot deal and imposition of the French Mandate, Saladin was popularized by nationalists and Islamists as a heroic figure of Syrian resistance against Zionism and Western imperialism.

Capitalizing on his status as a pan-Arab icon, the rival Ba'athist regimes in Syria and Iraq both incorporated Saladin into their official propaganda. State propaganda compared Hafez al-Assad to Saladin in official portraits, statues, literature, etc. as part of the wider promotion of the pervasive personality cult of Assadism. After his father's death, Bashar al-Assad inherited the personality cult and intensified it with technocratic themes. In contemporary Syria, Saladin is portrayed as a national hero in mass media, Arab TV shows, educational curricula, popular culture, and conservative Muslim circles.

Butrus al-Bustani, a Mount Lebanon-born convert from the Maronite Church to Protestantism, started one of the region's first nationalist newspapers, Nafir Suria in Beirut in the aftermath of the Mount Lebanon civil war of 1860 and the massacre of Christians in Damascus in the same year. Bustani, who was deeply opposed to all forms of sectarianism, said Ḥubb al-Waṭan min al-Īmān ("Love of the homeland is a matter of faith"). As early as 1870, when discerning the notion of fatherland from that of the nation and applying the latter to Greater Syria, Francis Marrash would point to the role played by language, among other factors, in counterbalancing religious and sectarian differences, and thus, in defining national identity.

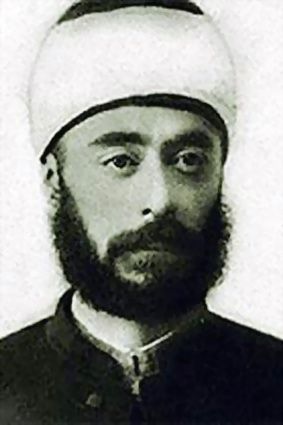
Revolutionary activist Abd al-Rahman al-Kawakibi

One of the major figures in the pan-Arab trend was the Syrian Islamist cleric Muhammad Rashid Rida, who played a key role in the formation of Arab societies and campaigned for the autonomy of Arab vilayets like Syria from the Ottoman Empire. Through his seminal pan-Islamist journal Al-Manar, Rida wrote on a wide range of issues, with topics covering religion, politics, science, technology, and culture. A strong proponent of Arab unity; Rida criticized the autocratic rule of the Ottoman dynasts and the domination of Turkish nationalist CUP in imperial politics. He was also a vehement opponent of European colonial powers and urged the Arab people to launch revolutionary action to resist Europe's imperialist plots. During World War I, Rida issued a fatwa urging Syrians to support the Ottoman empire against Allied colonial powers and simultaneously oppose groups linked to the Young Turks. At the same time, he had established a secret society known as the "Society of the Arab Association" (Jam'iyyat al-Jami'a al-Arabiyya), which was clandestinely making efforts for the establishment of an Islamic Empire spanning the Arabian Peninsula, Greater Syria and Iraq; with its government being headquartered in Damascus. The empire was to be headed by an Arab Caliph, and the Caliph was to appoint a president for every five-year term, from a list of candidates suggested to him by the Council of Representatives.

What is a nation or a people? Is it a heap of creatures . . . slaves of a king? Or is it a community connected by ties of race, language, fatherland, and common rights?!.. A nation that does not feel, in its entirety or its majority, the tortures of tyranny is not worthy of freedom

— Abd al-Rahman al-Kawakibi, In Taba’i al-lstibdad ("The Nature of Tyranny")

Rashid Rida's comrade Abd al-Rahman al-Kawakibi (1854-1902), a Syrian of Kurdish origin born in Aleppo, was another major Muslim figure who championed Arab unity. Al-Kawakibi believed that Arabs are the best people to lead Islamic revival, and promoted the re-kindling of Arab consciousness as a means to empower the Muslim World. Through his books like Taba'i al-lstibdad (The Nature of Tyranny) and Umm al-Qura (The Mother of Villages—Mecca), Kawakibi defied the Ottoman sultan and promoted Islamic revolution to overthrow various political tyrannies. Kawakibi believed that pristine Islam opposed tyranny and advocated a political system that was a middle road between democracy and dictatorship. He argued that tyranny leads to the weakening of the national spirit and the degradation of national culture. Kawakibi's second major work, Umm al-Qura, was about an Islamic congress of representatives from all across the Muslim world, who held debates to discuss Islamic socio-political revival. Rashid Rida popularised the work through Al-Manar in 1902.

=== The formation of the Syrian state ===
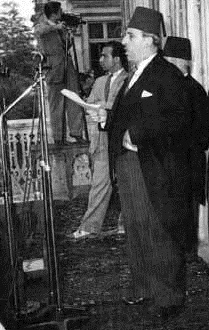
Syrian President Shukri al-Quwatli announcing declaration of independence from the French colonial rule, 17 April 1946. French military withdrawal was completed two days earlier

Flag of the First and Second Syrian Republics, which has been adopted by the Syrian opposition as the national flag

As in many other countries of the region, after the fall of the Ottoman Empire, the land now known as Syria was left without a common identity to bond the different ethnicities together. Already during the period of the Tanzimat, thinkers like Butrus al-Bustani, belonging to the Nahda movement, were claiming the existence of a natural Syrian nation, or Great Syria, also known as the region of the Levant.

Nonetheless, after World War I, the area was subject to the division into spheres of influence operated by the British and the French with the Sykes-Picot agreement. After a brief attempt in 1919 to establish an independent Arab Kingdom of Syria under King Faisal, in 1920 the territory was split into three separate regions under the control of France.

After years of conflict and revolts, in 1936 Syria managed to negotiate a treaty of independence from France and became a nation with Hashim al-Atassi as its first president. In the following years, Syria passed from being still under the influence of France to being controlled by Vichy France in 1940 during World War II, to becoming again occupied by British and Free French forces with the 1941 Syria–Lebanon campaign. After 1941, the Prime Minister of Iraq Nuri Pasha al-Said expressed his support for a Greater Syrian country that included Syria, Lebanon, Palestine and Jordan with Iraq associated to it.

After a five-year-long struggle, and with the end of the war, on 17 April 1946, Syria became a recognized independent state. However, the Israeli–Palestinian conflict of 1948, and the rise of pan-Arabist nationalist movements, led to multiple coups d'état, the most famous that of 1949 by Husni al-Za'im. It was during this revolutionary period that the Ba'ath Socialist Party emerged for the first time. The party, founded in 1947, promoted pan-Arabist and anti-imperialist ideas. It quickly gained popularity, becoming the second biggest party in the Syrian parliament in the 1954 elections. The Ba'ath party played a major role in offering the Syrian community a new imagined identity that could even connect them to other countries in the Arab world under existent traditions.

== Ideology ==
=== Syrian nationalism ===
Syrian nationalism posited a common Syrian history and nationality, grouping all the different religious sects and variations in the area, as well as the region's mixture of different peoples. However, Greater Syria does not have a history as a state, and its inhabitants do not identify as members of a Greater Syrian nation. The idea of a Greater Syria is not inherently political; it bases itself on culture, seeing that people from the region share many traditions. Pan-Syrian nationalism can be distinguished in two forms: a pragmatic and a pure form. The pragmatic form accepts pan-Arabism and sees the building of Greater Syria as a step forward to building an Arab nation. The pure form completely rejects the idea of an Arab nation, stating that Greater Syria is a complete nation on its own.

Syrian nationalism is a generally secular movement, believing that a Syrian can have any religion indigenous to the area: Sunni or Shia Muslim, Christian or Jewish. This has attracted many Christians to it (as well as to the equally non-religious Arab nationalism), since the Christian churches form a religious minority in the Middle East, and often fear being dwarfed by Muslim majority populations. Syria's geography as a crossroads also explains the diversity of the area of Syria.

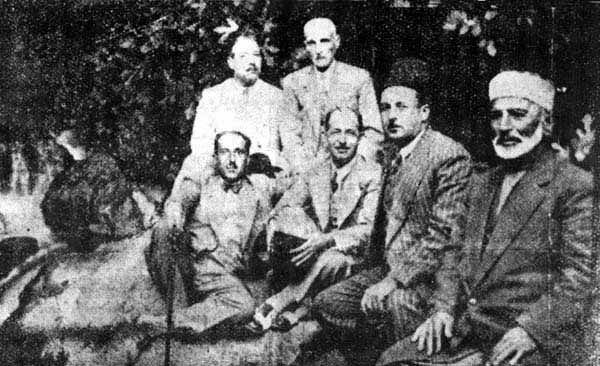
Seated from left to right: Shukri al-Quwatli (future president), Saadallah al-Jabiri (future prime minister), Rida al-Shurbaji (co-founder of the National Bloc), Sheikh Saleh al-Ali, commander of the Syrian Coastal Revolt of 1919. Standing are Hajj Adib Kheir (left) and Ibrahim Hananu, commander of the Aleppo Revolt

Syrian nationalism often advocates a "Greater Syria", based on ancient concepts of the boundaries of the region then known as "Syria" (stretching from southern Turkey through Lebanon, Palestine into Jordan), but also including Cyprus, Iraq, Kuwait, the Ahvaz region of Iran, the Sinai Peninsula, and the Cilicia region of Turkey.

Historically, it is mostly after the end of the First World War that the pan-Syrian nationalism became very political with the creation of many political parties from the Syrian diaspora. Amongst these organizations were: the Syrian Union Party and the Syrian Moderates Party (both originating in Cairo); the National Democratic Party (Buenos Aires); the New Syria Party and the Syrian National Society (both in the United States). The National Democratic Party, the Syrian Moderates Party, the New Syria Party, and the Syrian National Society advocated a unified, federated and independent state of Greater Syria, with the United States as a guarantor of its independence. However, this nationalism did not last for long as these parties sympathized with Lebanese and Arab nationalisms. The only party that did not wane was the Syrian Social Nationalist Party, later founded.

=== Role of language ===
As the pan-Syrian ideology is based on a shared geographical culture, it is open to different opinions about the state of languages. The pan-Arabism seemed to exclude minorities as they would not necessarily speak Arabic, the pan-Syrian ideology gained followers. While al-Bustani considered Standard Arabic an essential part of this identity, Saadeh considered Arabic to be one of the many languages of the Syrian people and instead believed that if a national language has to be used for shared communication and written culture, without losing everyone's other language, it has to be 'Syrianised' Arabic.

== Pan-Syrianism ==
Apart from the conventional pan-Arabism and Arab nationalism advocated by most Syrian nationalists, a minority of Syrian nationalists also articulated independent pan-Syrianism. Although pan-Syrian trends may include the idea that the nation is a part of the Arab world, it also claims Syria as the leader of the Arab people, opposing therefore pan-Arabist movements that would position all Arabs on the same level. The movement culminated in the creation of a party, the Syrian Social Nationalist Party (SSNP) founded in 1932 by Antoun Saadeh.

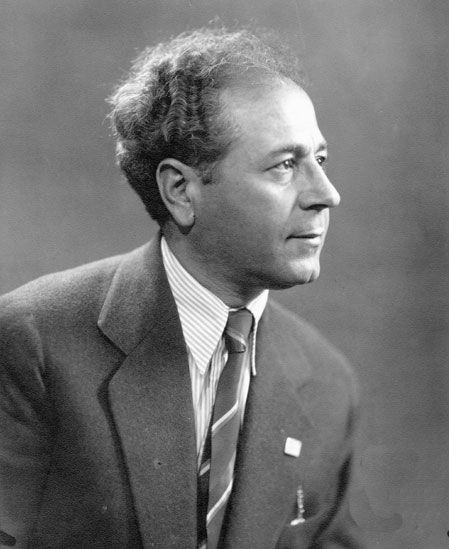
Antoun Saadeh, the founder of SSNP

=== Syrian Social Nationalist Party (SSNP) ===
A modern-day political movement that advocates the Greater Syria's borders with a pure form of pan-Syrian nationalism is the Syrian Social Nationalist Party (SSNP), founded in 1932 by Antoun Saadeh. Saadeh, a strong proponent of the irredentist notion of Greater Syria, was an admirer of Adolf Hitler and incorporated Nazi symbolism into his party insignia.

The SSNP considers the reason for its loss of territory to the "foreign" Israelis that many Syrians embraced pan-Arab views which led to the dominance of Egypt and Saudi Arabia over the conflict, where they did not care about sacrificing what Syrians had for their agenda and personal benefits instead of limiting other non-Syrian Arabs to supporting Syrians' decisions. According to Antoun, this happened when the Syrians had a weak ideology that did not unite them.

=== Arab Socialist Ba'ath Party – Syria Region ===
While Syrian irredentism is primarily associated with the SSNP, a more moderate form of pan-Arab irredentism, viewed through the lens of Syrian nationalism, was also central to the Syrian Ba'ath Party's foreign policy. Ba'athist Syria longed for the various territories it had lost over the years, including Alexandretta (now Hatay) to Turkey in 1939, Lebanon, which gained independence in 1945, Israel and Jordan in 1948, and the Golan Heights, which was occupied by Israel in 1967. In contrast to the SSNP, the neo-Ba'athist regime from the 1970s limited its territorial claims to Jordan, Lebanon, and the region of Palestine, while shifting from pan-Arabism to "Syro-centric Arabism."

== See also ==
- Fertile Crescent
