= Rashid Rida during World War I =

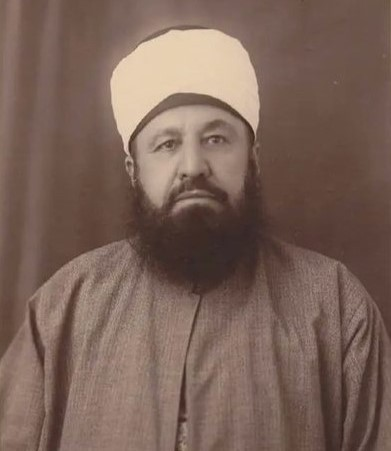
Rashid Rida

Before the outbreak of the First World War, scholars of the Arab Salafiyya movement represented the leading voice of Islamic religious dissent within the Ottoman Empire. Their most influential theologian Muhammad Rashid Rida, an ardent critic of Abdul Hamid II and Turkish nationalism, regarded Ottoman kings as unqualified to rule over the affairs of the Muslim World. While excoriating the Ottomans as an artificial caliphate based on unjust wars and conquests; Salafi scholars nonetheless strongly forbade rebellion against the Ottoman authority due to their insight of dangers posed by the expanding European colonialism. Rashid Rida and his pupils perceived the Ottoman state as an essential entity for allowing Muslims to successfully repel European imperial powers and rebuked the proponents for an alternative Caliphate; suspecting them of serving the aims of imperial powers. All of this changed with the Ottoman entry into World War 1 in October 1914, on the side of the Central Powers. Rashid Rida viewed the war as part of the secular Turkish nationalist programme of the Young Turks, a faction he vehemently denounced as murtadd (apostates).

In several Pan-Arabist journals of the time, the Ottoman Empire was condemned to the same extent as were the British and French, portraying it as a continuation of the Mamluk rule of oppression, humiliation, and impoverishment. Rida presented a more independent and sophisticated argument in Al-Manar, and dwelt much more intellectually on the consequences of the war for the people in the Middle East. He was far more critical of the French and the British empires and of their colonial ambitions. In his fatwas, Rashid Rida comprehensively explained the issue over political allegiance (bay'ah) to the Ottoman Empire, which had become one of the most important concerns in Salafi circles. During the early phase of the World War, Rida viewed the Ottoman Empire acted as one of the final barricades against encroaching European colonialism. He distinguished between the Young Turks, whom he opposed vehemently, and the Ottoman state, insisting that every Muslim's loyalty is only to the Ottoman Sultan-Caliph. As the war continued, Rida's stance shifted; as he saw the Ottoman state as synonymous with the tyranny of Young Turks. Rida described the Ottoman Empire as a client-state subservient to Germany and declared that German colonialism was as much evil as British empire. He was particularly critical of Berlin–Baghdad railway, which he considered as part of the wider expansionist project of German imperialism. Over the course of the war, Rida began warning about an imminent Ottoman collapse, motivating him to look to other Muslim rulers to wage the banners of Jihad against the European powers.

During World War I, Rashid Rida's activities primarily involved bolstering efforts to establish an alternative pan-Islamic state, led by a suitable candidate elected as Khalifa, in the increasingly likely scenario of an Ottoman collapse. Throughout this period he was most concerned about British imperial designs to divide and conquer the Arab World. His skepticism intensified when British officials turned a blind eye to his proposed caveats. After the public disclosure of Sykes-Picot agreement in 1917, Rida became a fervent enemy of the British empire and described it as one of the biggest imperial powers that sought to obstruct pan-Islamist efforts to re-establish the Islamic Caliphate.

== Outbreak of the war (1914) ==
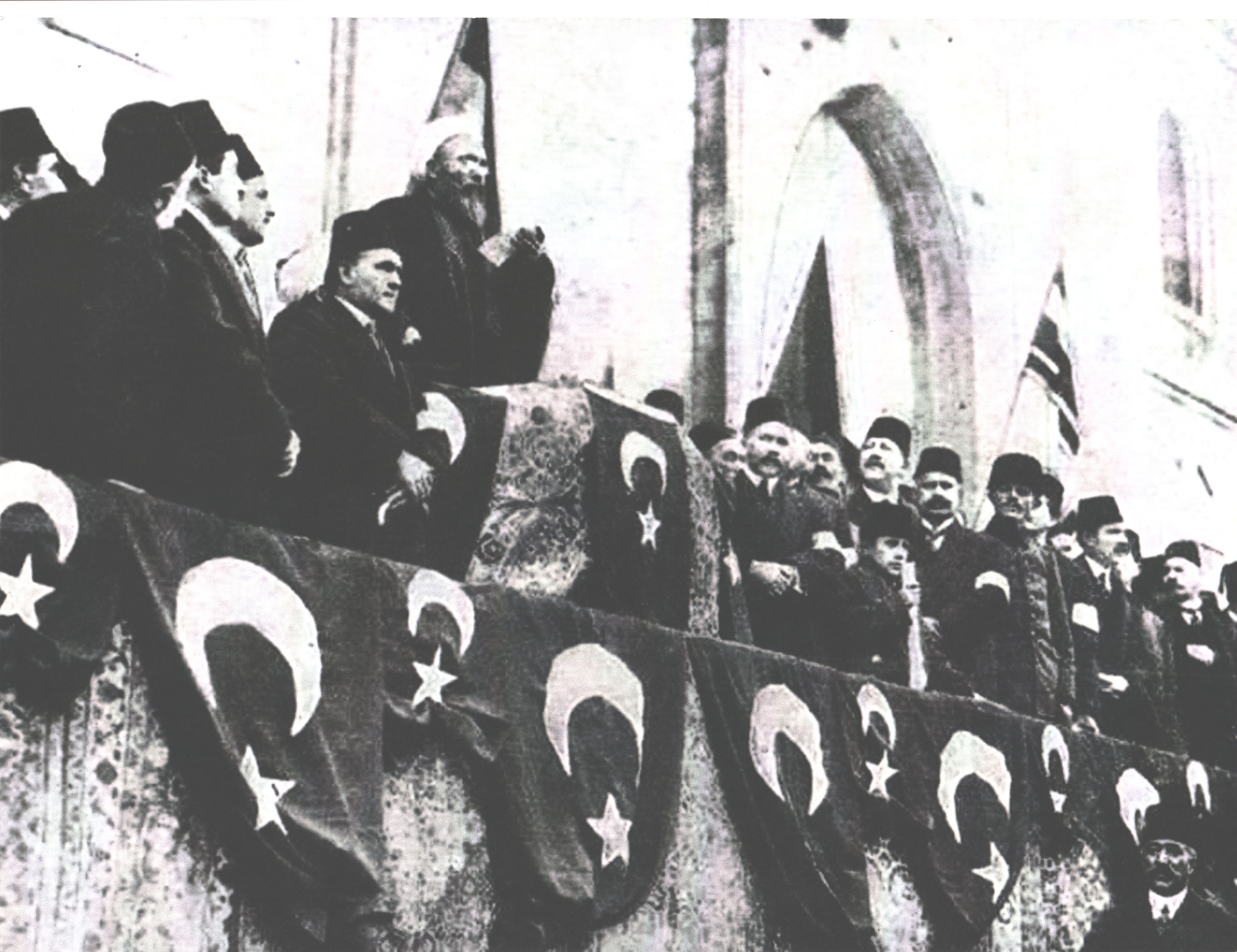
Fetva emini Ali Haydar Efendi declaring Jihad against the Allies in Istanbul, November 14, 1914

The First World War broke out in the Arab world in November 1914. The biggest concern of Rashid Rida during this period was the need to defend and maintain an Islamic Caliphate. While this priority had made him stress his Ottoman loyalty both before and during the war; it pushed him in the direction of trying to revive an Arab caliphate in the subsequent years. According to Rida, it was the non-Arabs who were responsible for the proliferation of pagan influences that threatened the Muslim Ummah. Rida believed that the re-establishment of an Arab leadership over the Islamic World was necessary to revive the Islamic prowess during the glorious epoch of the Salaf al-Salih. He pushed forward with his plans for an “Arab caliphate” through the activities of his secret society Al-jami‘a al-‘arabiyya, defying the Ottoman government, having perceived its political instability and foreign entanglements. He corresponded with various rulers of the Arabian Peninsula, seeking a pact among them for a future union of Arabian Peninsula and Arab provinces of the Ottoman Empire.

Abdallah I of Jordan, a son of Sharif Husayn of Mecca, met with British officials in 1914 in Egypt on preliminary talks that would lead to the McMahon-Husayn Correspondence the following year. In Cairo, Abdallah met Rida and joined Jam'iyyat al-Jami‘a al-Arabiyya. Per the society's goals, Rida called for an alliance among the Emirs of the Arabian Peninsula, which would pave the way for the regions of Hijaz, Najd, Yemen, and 'Asir to form an Islamic union that would uphold Tawhid, implement Sharia and wage Jihad to defend the peninsula from non-Muslim threats. Although Abdallah was positive to spirit of the program, his father Sharif Husayn rejected the proposal for fear of alienating the Allied Powers.

Despite Husayn's refusal, Rida issued a fatwa for the Syrian Muslims, calling upon them to fight on the side of the Ottoman Empire and assist in their Jihad against the Allied powers according to the norms of sharia. Rida argued that his calls for Islamic Renaissance had led to social and spiritual progress across the Muslim World, and that its purpose was not to destabilise the Empire; but rather to strengthen and reform it back to correct Islamic principles. However, this demonstration of loyalty was not unconditional. Rida warned: “But I remind you that ... duty to obey the Empire refers only to its official and legal commands.” Organisations and parties such as the ruling CUP should be opposed, since they were from the secularist apostates who transgressed the Sharia. Rida's underlying motivation was the goal to establish a Pan-Islamic supra-state uniting led by an Arab Caiph elected through Shura; and the implementation of Sharia (Islamic law) via such an Islamic state. In his fatwa issued to Syrians imploring them to wage Jihad against the Allies alongside the Ottoman armies, Rida also cautioned to not initiate hostilities against the native Syrian Christians.

== Disputes with British officials (1914–1915) ==
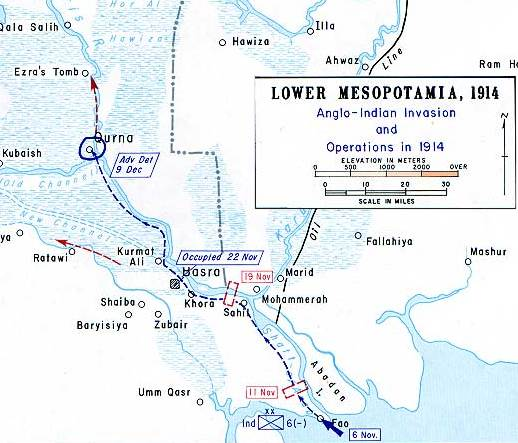
Map showing the British campaign in Basra, 1914

Rashid Rida and his Salafi disciples, wary of both the Central Powers and Allies, saw the worsening climate of the raging war as a chance for liberation of Arab lands from the Ottoman yoke. Rida was no longer able to maintain his former tight-rope approach towards the Ottomans as the war spread across the Empire. He concluded that Ottoman collapse was only a question of time, and this set him in a collision course towards what he had feared and tried to prevent the most: European control of Arab lands. As the war raged, Rida intensified his campaigning for the re-establishment of an Islamic caliphate or a Pan-Islamic confederacy led by Arabs to substitute the Ottoman Empire. Rida established direct contacts with British officials like Gilbert Clayton, the Director of British Intelligence in Cairo, and informed them that he was ready to mediate between Britain and Arab rulers as the war spread to the Middle East. Rashid Rida's Society of Arab Association commanded deep influence on Islamist elements in Ottoman army; particularly the Sunni Arab officers disaffected by the German dominance. These officers held Rashid Rida in high regard and was patiently waiting for his fatwa to wage Jihad against the Young Turk regime at the optimal moment. Rida persuaded the British Intelligence Department in Cairo to give military weaponry for his Mujahidin in establishing a pan-Islamic state led by an Arab Caliph. During the early stage of the war, certain British officers in Africa were receptive to the proposals of Rida. However, majority of British officials, particularly from the India Office outright dismissed his proposals as "fanatical" and outright dangerous to British imperial hegemony and this became their official policy. Rashid Rida reacted by turning vehemently anti-British; accusing Britain of waging a War on Islam and replace the implementation of Sharia (Islamic laws) with Western secularism.

British had sought an alliance with Arabs against the Ottomans through diplomatic engagement with both the Hashimite family in Mecca and various pan-Arab factions. Although he was encouraged by the initial positive tone of British officials, Rashid Rida firmly rejected any notions of a Caliphate dependent upon British power. In conversations with Rida, they argued that Britain was ready to assist the Arabs to free themselves from the Ottoman yoke and that Britain had no imperial ambitions in the Arab countries. According to Rashid Rida, prominent British officials in Egypt had assured that Britain would not occupy Arab lands and would recognise Arab proclamation of independence. In any scenario where British armies have to invade the Arab countries during the war to expel the Turks, they would evacuate the Arab lands as soon as the war was over. Rida suggested Britain to ratify these oral promises as an official declaration. A draft for the proclamation was written by Rida himself and conveyed to the British authorities on 4 December 1914. The draft was a record of promises given by British officials Ronald Storrs and Gilbert Clayton to Rida in Cairo. It specified the regions of the Arab Caliphate as "Arabia, Palestine, Syria, Mesopotamia, the countries lying between the Red Sea, Bahr El-Arab, Persian Gulf, frontiers of Persia and Anatolia and the Mediterranean Sea" which would be recognised by Britain without any interference on Arab sovereignty. Rida wanted these promises to be formalized by London, by publicly announcing unequivocal promises regarding their commitment to support Arab independence and refrain from trying to control them in any form whatsoever, whether by occupation or protection. However, London refused to ratify their secret promises and never published Rida's draft. Instead, the draft was altered, and an edited version was sent to Rida, which removed British denial of territorial expansion in the Muslim World. It was supplanted with "a promise of free trade to the Arabs in the Arab country which will become possessed by the English Government." Rida ardently denounced the alterations as an evil betrayal which departed from the earlier official assurances, thus making the document a potential justification for further British colonial aggression and "leaving it devoid of the spirit which would tend to gain the hearts and confidence of the Arabs". Rida condemned the British occupation of Faw and Basra and called on Muslims to expel them from Islamic Lands.

In addition to preserving an Islamic temporal power, Rashid Rida considered the Islamic sovereignty in the sacred lands of Arabian Peninsula to be of paramount priority. Outside the Arabian Peninsula, the Arab Asiatic regions of Syria, Palestine and Iraq were unnegotiable parts of Rida's Arab Caliphate since these regions included historically significant cities like Karbala, Baghdad, Damascus etc. as well as the third holiest city in Islam, Jerusalem. Rida considered the barbarism and tyranny of Russian colonial empire as far worse than British rule and feared a Russian take-over of Istanbul in an event of Ottoman collapse. He sought various diplomatic means to avert such a disaster and opened channels of communications with the British precisely on that basis. Rida warned the British not to misconstrue his overtures for Arab-British cooperation as justification for imposing British protectorates in Islamic holy lands. In December 1914, England abolished the Khedivate of Egypt by dethroning Abbas II and installed Husayn Kamel as sultan of Egypt, turning it into its protectorate. Rida protested these events; stating that Muslims would reject a puppet Sultan or Caliph nominally installed by them.

In February 1915, Rida advanced a detailed memo warning the British authorities to immediately abandon any and all imperial aspirations on Arab territories. He stated bluntly that should Britain proceed with its plans for usurping Muslim lands such as Iraq, Syria, and Egypt, or install their puppet Sultans; they would be met with a declaration of total Jihad not only against the British; but the entire Christendom. Since Germans were competing with the British for creating an alliance with the Islamic world, Britain should be wise enough to back efforts for an alternative Islamic Caliphate. The memo also reminded the British officials that if they did not issue an official announcement of British support for Arab independence; pan-Islamist revolutionaries by and large shall opt to fight alongside the Central Powers. Despite such warnings and threats, most British officials discarded Rida's programme for creation of Arab Caliphate as unrealistic and Utopian. The director of British intelligence in Cairo, Gilbert Clayton said to Rida: "[it is] only a sort of Utopia which cannot be reached except by very gradual stages. ... the British Empire took many hundred years to build and so will an Arab Empire!" Reginald Wingate, British Governor General of Sudan and Sirdar of the Egyptian army, corresponded to Clayton: "He [Rida] seems to think that the Arabs can become immediately an Empire, whilst as a matter of fact they are scarcely an embryo." Rida's vision for a pan-Islamic Caliphate was a minority amongst the Syrian activists in Cairo and the British officials refrained from granting any guarantees to assuage Rida.

=== Encounter with Mark Sykes ===
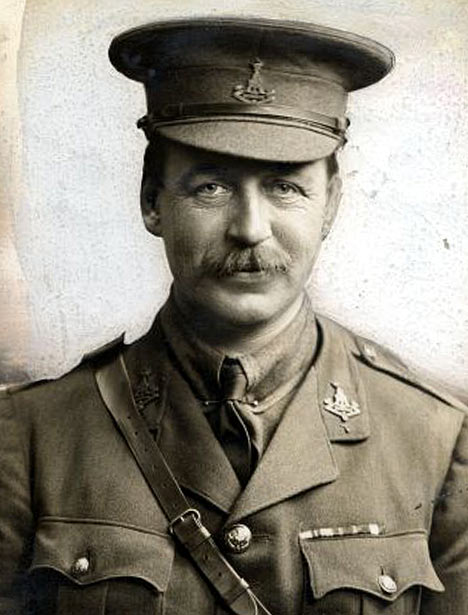
Colonel Mark Sykes

As the world war escalated, tensions and mutual hostilities between Rida and British officials deepened. More and more inflammatory articles were becoming published through Rida's Al-Manar, to which the British responded by censoring the magazine. In July 1915, Rida engaged in direct talks with the Assistant secretary of the British War Cabinet, Mark Sykes, outlining his vision of a sovereign pan-Islamic state. He argued that the era of Turkish domination of Muslims had ended and said that the time for an Islamic Caliphate led by Arab Muslims has approached. Rida's proposed pan-Arab Caliphate consisted of the Arabian Peninsula and extended north up to the Anatolian boundary of Marash-Diarbakr-Zakho-Ruwanduz. During the meeting, Sykes hinted the likelihood of distributing the area to the Allied imperial powers. Outraged by the suggestion, Rida threatened Sykes with the spectre of large-scale Jihadist uprisings across the British empire. If the British made any moves to disrupt efforts to establish the Pan-Islamic Caliphate, Rida warned of an enduring challenge from an Islamic-German Axis against the British empire. Rida bluntly stated that Islamic power would be expanded to subvert Christian influence as much as possible and stated to Sykes that Britain feared the Islamic World precisely due to its capability. The encounter ended on a rough note and a few months later, Sykes depicted Rida as a dangerous zealot in his official reports, writing:

"[Rashid Rida] is a leader of Pan-Arab and Pan-Islamic thought. In conversation he talks much as he writes. He is a hard uncompromising fanatical Moslem, the mainspring of whose ideas is the desire to eliminate Christian influence and to make Islam a political power in as wide a field as possible.... He resolutely refused to entertain any idea of control or advisers with executive authority of any kind. He held that the Arabs were more intelligent than Turks and that they could easily manage their own affairs; no argument would move him on this point;.. his ideas coincide with those of a considerable number of the Arab Ulema. It will be seen that it is quite impossible to come to any understanding with people who hold such views, and it may be suggested that against such a party force is the only argument that they can understand"

=== Husayn-MacMohan correspondence ===
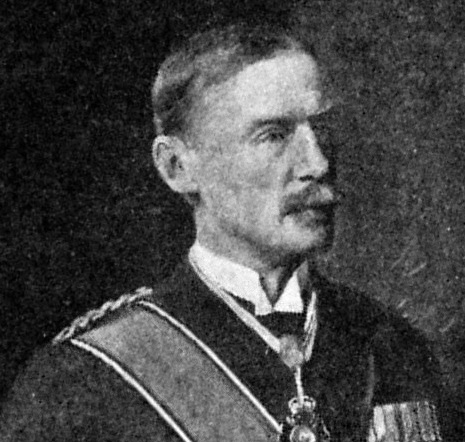
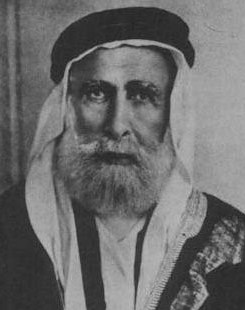
Sir Henry McMahon and Sharif Hussein

The encounter confirmed Rashid Rida's misgivings of future British plans for the Arab World. As Rida's Pan-Islamist campaign for Caliphate became more and more popular, British authorities became increasingly aggrieved. In October 1915, Sharif of Mecca Husayn ibn Ali received a dispatch from Arthur Henry McMahon, the British High Commissioner of Egypt, which assented to most of the territorial stipulations made by him. In return, he was to revolt against the Ottoman Empire in co-ordination with the Allied Powers. The original text of the dispatch consisted of numerous conditions that greatly reduced the size of the promised Arab empire, particularly along its north-west. These stipulations and their analysis were subject to public scrutiny and lead to hostile remarks from Pan-Islamist ideologues. With the purpose of toning down the controversy; Cairene Oriental secretary Ronald Storrs exposed Rida to the full text of the correspondence, two months later. Outraged by the terms of the correspondence, Rida responded:

"This is an agreement that only an enemy of the Arabs could possibly be satisfied with, or a donkey who does not understand its meaning."

=== "General Organic Law of the Arab Empire" ===
Rida engaged in a heated argument with Storrs over the letter. Rida condemned the ambiguities of most of the clauses in the agreement, particularly in relation to Syria's borders, and accused the British of opposing the establishment of the Pan-Islamic Caliphate. Rida would prepare a document which holistically explained his programme for a Qurayshite Caliphate in "The General Organic Law of the Arab Empire," and send it to Storrs after two days. It proposed the creation of a sovereign Islamic union that enforces sharia (Islamic laws), consisting of the regions of the Arabian Peninsula, Syria and Iraq.

The proposed Arab empire was a decentralised state and granted provincial autonomy. Legal system was to be based on Sharia, with Islam as the official religion of the state and Arabic as official language. Every province in the Caliphate had a state council elected by its inhabitants, which had independence in internal administration subject to the Central authority in general policy. The general administrative policy was to be managed by a 5-year term President, a shura of elected representatives from the Empire and a Council of Ministers chosen by the President. The president is nominated by the Khalifa from amongst the three candidates elected by the Shura of representatives. The Khalifa will be in charge of religious matters; recognize “General Organic Law of the Empire” and rule by the sharia. He will be assisted in this by a legal council of scholarly experts at whose head will be the “Shaykh al-Islam” who would check the powers of the Khalifa. The Khalifa had the authority to settle any dispute and the resolutions passed by the Council of Representatives needed his confirmation for execution. The headquarters of the Caliphate was to be in Mecca and the headquarters of the Government and the Council of Representatives was to be in Damascus. All inhabitants of the Islamic Union were guaranteed religious freedom. Non-Muslims were allowed to reach a ministerial post, but not judges in the Islamic Sharia courts. Internal problems of the non-Muslim communities had to be solved by their own clerical leadership. Rida's proposal went unheeded, since the British considered the plan as a challenge to their imperial hegemony, and calculated that most of the rulers of the Arabian Peninsula had little incentive to adopt the framework based on the General Organic Law.

== Arab revolt (1916–1918) ==
Sensing British schemes to impose its domination the Muslim World, Rida's anti-British stances exacerbated and he wrote: "England was trying to efface the Muhammedan authority and rule from the world". In June 1916, Sharif Husayn of Mecca launched his Arab Revolt against the Ottomans, with the support of the Allies. Rida simultaneously supported the Arab revolt in Hejaz while maintaining his oath of allegiance (bay'ah) to the Ottoman Sultan; due to his fear of an imminent defeat of Ottoman Empire which would justify colonial powers to occupy Arab territories. Differentiating between the Sultan and the Young Turks, Rida asserted that the revolt was the eventual consequence of Turkish nationalist programme implemented by the C.U.P. regime. In Rida's perspective, Sharif Husayn's announcement of sovereignty was the gateway to establish a wider Pan-Islamic Union of friendly Arab emirs in the Peninsula and a preliminary action to safeguard Hejaz from European occupation in the likely scenario of an Ottoman disintegration. Moreover, Rida lambasted the Young Turk regime as the thralls of German imperialists and argued that Hejazi separatism in and of itself would not lead to the collapse of the empire.

Justifying Hejazi independence as a "precautionary measure" to protect the holy land, Rida wrote:

"If [the Ottoman state] and its allies come out of this war victorious, then it would be easy for it to do as it wishes in the Hijaz. If, on the other hand, its enemies come out victorious then Ottoman concern with the situation in the Hijaz becomes irrelevant, since [Ottoman] unity would naturally be shattered to pieces and, it is feared, its enemies will end its independence. In that case every Muslim, whether he is an Arab or a Turk, would heartily wish that the Hijaz and other Arab lands should escape falling under the tutelage of the victorious Allies."

The early hopes of Rida were that the Hejazi rebellion would complement his efforts to build a robust, pan-Arab Islamic Empire that could stand up to colonialism and the infedility of apostate Young Turk regime that suppressed Islamists. In Rida's view, the CUP regime's irredentist Pan-Turkic ideology sought to separate Turkish people from their Islamic roots and wanted the Arabs serve as second-class citizens within a secular reconstruction of the Ottoman Empire. Therefore, it was incumbent upon all Muslims to oppose the CUP government and establish an Islamic state led by Arabs that would implement Sharia and bolster efforts to revitalise the Arab culture and Arabic language. At the same time, Islamic faith is undoubtedly superior to Arabism and an Islamic Arab Empire was duty-bound to implement the Islamic law and unite all Muslims, regardless of their race and nationality. British and French suspected Rida for his outspoken views and pro-Caliphate activities such as his correspondence in Hejaz with Sharif Husayn, as part of his efforts to organise a rebellion against the British in Egypt. When the British intelligence got hold of his several private letters revealing these activities, Rida was arrested and put under detailed surveillance. Although the authorities initially planned to exile him to Malta, they eventually abstained due to fear of potential backlash across the Arab World.

=== Pilgrimage to Hejaz and split with Sharif Husayn ===
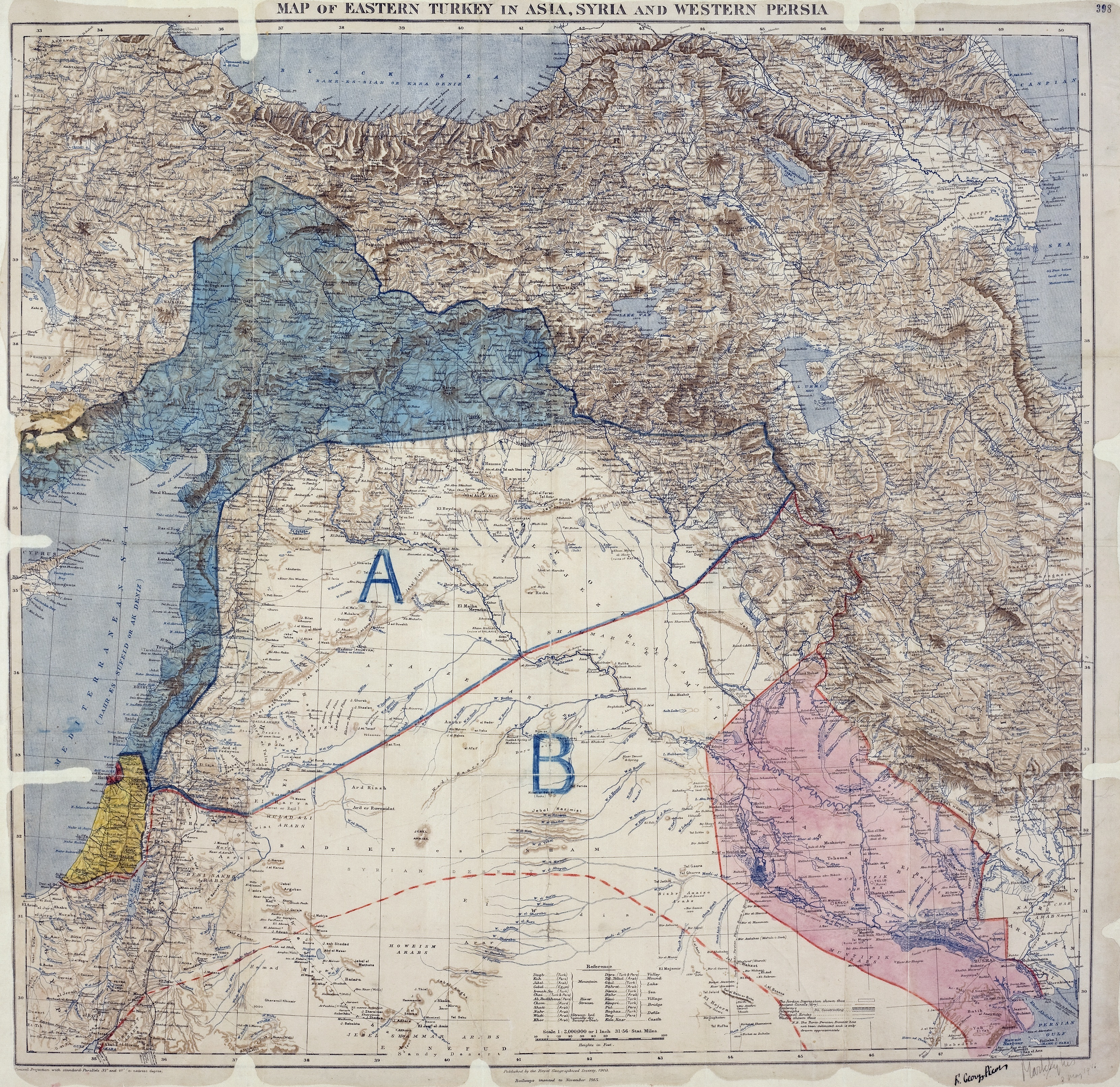
Map signed by Mark Sykes and François Georges-Picot, enclosed in Cambon's 9 May 1916 letter to Grey

Around four months after the Arab revolt, Rashid Rida was able to travel to Mecca as part of a delegation to perform the hajj and encountered Sharif Husayn personally to incite him against the British. In stark contrast to Rida's vision, Sharif Husayn had only aimed for establishing a kingdom independent from Istanbul and was unwilling to be part of the Pan-Islamic Union subject to the programme of General Organic Law of Arab Empire. While in Hejaz, Rashid Rida distributed pamphlets spreading anti-European propaganda and called upon the native Arabs to unite in preparation for the subsequent Jihad. Highly disturbed by Rida's campaign, he often discouraged his Pan-Islamist activities, even publicly stopping his sermons to Hajjis in one scenario. Husayn assuaged alarmed Allied delegates by stating that Rida didn't represent his political orientation. Rashid Rida also directly warned the sharif to refrain from declaring himself as caliph, since he had already given his bay'ah (oath of allegiance) to the Ottoman sultan Muhammad Reşâd. As per the classical Sunni doctrines, Rashid Rida believed that there can be only a single valid caliph at a particular time. Husayn was offended by Rida's opposition to his personal ambitions.

The biggest clash between Husayn and Rida occurred over the latter's plans to organise a pan-Islamic Arab Union, which was once rejected by Husayn before. Rida's main goal for visiting the Hijaz was to convince Sharif Husayn to join his "Society of the Arab Association"(Jam'iyyat ul-Jami‘a al-Arabiyya) to form an Islamic coalition consisting of the Sultans of the Arabian Peninsula. He reiterated the basic programme of the Society, i.e., to form an alliance with the Emirate of Nejd and the rulers of ‘Asir, Yemen; with each ruler retaining autonomy in their self-governance, uniting to defend the Arabian Peninsula from foreign threats, and cooperate in the future to defend Arab lands from foreign occupation. The alliance would be headed by the "Council of the Alliance" (Majlis al-Hilf), headquartered in Mecca, which would convene annually to discuss common interests and Husayn was offered candidacy for its presidency. However, Husayn was unwilling to share power and firmly rejected Rida's proposals, even revealing that he intended to attack the other rulers. Rida's anti-European attitudes, his advocacy of a pan-Islamic union and his rejection of Husayn's claims to the Caliphate, made him a persona non-grata in the Hijaz. Husayn's outright rejection of Rida's Pan-Islamist programme infuriated him and as soon as he returned to Egypt a public feud with the Sharif ensued. Through his journal Al-Manar, Rida started attacking Husayn, condemning him as a selfish, corrupt ruler propped up by the British. Rida vehemently condemned his secret dealings with the British empire that sold out the regions of Iraq and Syria to the whims of colonial powers. In May 1917 Al-Manar was banned in the Hashemite Kingdom. The Russian empire was party to the secret 1916 Sykes-Picot agreement and when the Bolsheviks came to power, Soviet Russia released the full-text of the agreement to the Press, embarrassing the British. Rida vehemently condemned the British and French for these imperial plans to occupy Arab lands.

=== Pan-Syrian activism ===
After his split with Husayn, Rida's activities during the year 1918 became more focused towards shaping the future of Syria, his land of birth. He began cooperating with various parties in working towards the independence of Arab states, although he was resentful of their political programs. The basis for joint cooperation between the various Syrian activists was their growing fear that Husayn might have sold out Syria in secret deals with the British and French. They also feared that Husayn would agree to the partition of Iraq and Syria between Britain and France to consolidate his personal gains in the Hijaz. Rashid Rida would forward a letter to US president Woodrow Wilson, asking him to prevent Britain from their ambitions to annex Iraq, Syria and parts of the Arabian Peninsula, which was contrary to the declared Wilsonian Principles of the Allies. In the letter, Rida described Sharif Husayn as a British vassal who was willing to sell-out Arab lands for personal ambitions.

== Religious and educational efforts (1911–1918) ==
Rashid Rida viewed the growing number of Christian missions in the Muslim world as one of the tools of colonialism. He mocked the Christian missionaries for preaching their faith "motivated by politics, followed by money, and protected by weapons." Rida likened the current predicament to the Spanish Inquisition, an era when the Catholic Church collaborated with Spanish rulers to forcibly convert Muslims and Jews to Christianity. He stressed that the Islamic Daʿwa had been "gaining millions of converts over the centuries", despite the scientific, social, military and political shortcomings widespread in the Muslim lands. Rida believed that this was because Islamic faith was harmonious with Fitrah (sound human nature), 'Aql (human intellect) and constituted the "truth" as opposed to "the ‘absurdity’ of the Christian creed." He was a prominent member of two Islamic associations – Shams al-ʾIslām (Sun of Islam) and Makārim al-ʾAkhlāq (Good Manners) – which rebutted the Christian missions, and made every attempt to rekindle Islamic religious awareness.

=== Dar al-Da'wa waI-Irshad ===
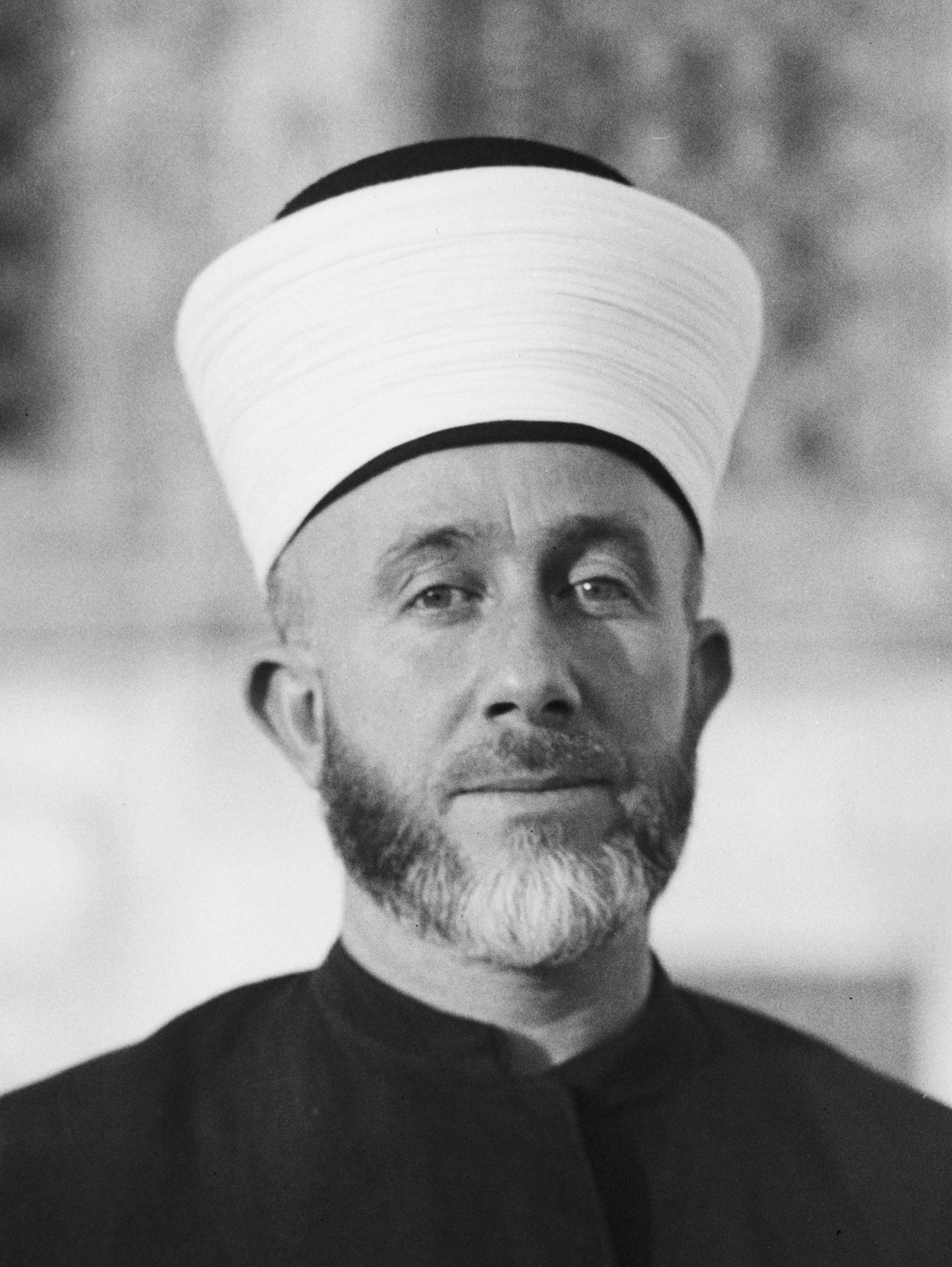
Palestinian Grand Mufti Muhammad Amin al-Husseini, was a close student of Sayyid Rashid Rida in the seminary of Dar al-Da'wa wa al-Irshad

Rashid Rida announced the founding of "the Society of Invitation and Guidance" (Jam'iyyat al-Da‘wa wal-Irshad) in January 1911. One of its aims was to counter the propaganda of Christian missionaries. This organisation would create "The House of Invitation and Guidance" ("Dar al-Da'wa waI-Irshad"), a seminary with the aim of educating Muslim students around the world. Al-Manar editorial offices served as the rendezvous for society meetings, and in October 1911, the school's regulations were formalised. The institution was officially non-political, and its graduates would be sent back to their native Islamic countries all across the World. Numerous Egyptian Islamic organisations sponsored the society, despite resistance from Egyptian nationalists. Regular classes started at Dār al-Daʿwa wāl-ʾIrshād from March 1912.

The seminary was a residential school that primarily educated two categories of students: murshids (guides), who worked inside the Muslim community to battle theological deviations, and the duʿāt (propagators), trained to effectively preach the religion to non-Muslims and defend Islam from attacks by missionaries. The curriculum also covered a wide range of material subjects such as international law, psychology, sociology, biology, mathematics, geography, and economics. The school sought out deserving Muslim students from all around the globe, particularly from underdeveloped nations like China and Indonesia, and provided them with housing, books, and living expenses. There was no fee for the studies. The students received instruction under the caveat that they adhere closely to Islamic principles. Rida furthermore mandated that any learner exhibiting symptoms of jinsiyya (citizenship/allegiance to a certain state), ʿaṣabiyya (collective feeling/sense of affiliation to something other than Islamic religion), or madhhabiyya (sole loyalty to an Islamic legal school), would be dismissed.The nationalist Wafd Party was highly critical of Rida's academy. The head editor of the party publication, ʿAbd al-ʿAzīz Jāwīsh (1876–1929), claimed that the school was a clandestine outfit which supported an Arab Caliphate in order to bring down the Ottoman Empire. Rida reiterated his commitment to not meddle in politics and refuted the accusations. Arab benefactors, Khadive Abbas Hilmi, and the Egyptian Awqaf Office provided the majority of the financial assistance.

British removed Abbas Hilmi from power when the First World War broke off, and the Khedivate was disbanded. Both the donations and the help from the Awqaf Office were terminated. After the First World War, the seminary was compelled to close because it ran out of funding. Its termination, according to Rida, was brought about by Bahāʾī advocates in Egypt and hostile British officials. The short-lived seminary's pupils and graduates included well-known, erudite scholars and leaders, such as Muhammad Bahjat al-Bitar (1894–1976), Muhammad Hamid al-Fiqi (1892–1959), Abd al-Zahir Abu al-Samh (1882–1951), Muhammad ibn ʿAbd al-Razzaq Hamza (1890–1972), future Grand Mufti of Jerusalem Hajji Amīn al-Ḥusaynī(1895–1974), Shaykh Yusuf Yāsīn (1888–1962), Muhammad al-ʿArabi al-Khatib (d. 1980), etc. Rida originally aimed the school to function as a worldwide missionary organisation and educational institute promoting an ecumenical Salafi Islam. Although Dar al-Daʿwa wal-Irshad foundered after the First World War due to political indifference and financial difficulties, it would inspire many Salafis like Taqi al-Din al-Hilali to promote the same kind of global mission and institutions that Rida had wished to cultivate, such as Dar al-Hadith al-Hasaniyya in Morocco.

== Evaluation of the war ==
Sayyid Rashid Rida decried the First World War's destruction and carnage as inevitable consequences of the West's ethical, spiritual and material decay. Rida did not refer to the conflict by its well-known Western appellation, "The Great War". Rida called it al-Harb al-Madaniyya (the crisis of civilisation); claiming that the "materialist European civilisation" ("al-madaniyya al-maddiyya") which had altogether forsaken religion in order to satiate its hegemonic avarice, was to blame for the War. In a piece titled "Harb al-madaniyya al-'urubiyya wa'l-muqarana baynaha wa-bayna al-madaniyya al-Islamiyya wal-futuhat al-'Arabiyya" ("The war of the European civilization and the comparison between it and the Islamic civilization and the Arab conquests"), Rida remarked that despite their technological accomplishments, the so-called civilised nations had shown that science, which in an ideal world should "be a source of justice, compassion, and happiness", could instead mutate into the "source of oppression and brutality". Asserting that Muslims could never have engaged in barbaric behaviour similar to that of Europeans, Rida argued that all materialistic civilizations inevitably reduce to a single prescription of "might is right". Rida at first was curious about Woodrow Wilson's proposals for a League of Nations that theoretically guaranteed all nations the right to self-determination. However, after the ending of war, Rida would become skeptical of the real intentions of the victorious European powers.

Rida believed that the conflict offered the Muslim community a potential for substantial transformation. He pointed to Mustafa Kemal's abolition of the Ottoman Sultanate as the start of a wider secularist, nationalist aggression on Islam, and expressed his concern that in the years following the war, fealty to states based on national identity would be enforced by secularists as the standard practice. The harmony between material civilization and spirituality, in Rida's opinion, can only be achieved via an Islamic order established by a real Caliphate. Rida thought that it was feasible to create a political community bounded by the ties of Islam, especially given the deteriorating state of the European international order. A representative government and smooth election of a caliph were made possible by the modernization of the globe, which was facilitated by the development of the steamship, the aeroplane, the railroad, the media, etc. So it was once again conceivable to choose a single Caliph in the current age who unites the Ummah much like the Khulafa Rashidun. Based on these principles, Rida proposed his solution to the present dangers of the world:

"The human need for spiritual and civilizational reform on the basis of sure foundations has intensified. Only with this will the enslavement of the weak by the powerful, the derision of the poor by the wealthy, and the danger to the wealthy [posed by] Bolshevism be ended. Moreover, it [reform] will negate distinctions of ethnicity so that the general brotherhood of humanity can be realized."

== Aftermath ==
=== Syrian independence movement ===
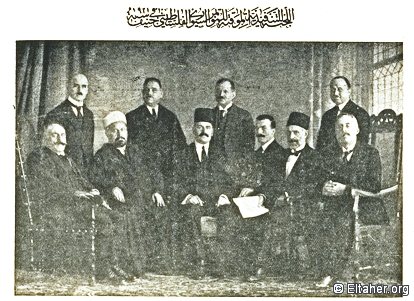
Meeting of the Interim Executive Committee of the Syro-Palestinian Congress in Geneva in 1921. Muhammad Rashid Rida is seated second from left.

The entire Fertile Crescent was occupied by the British by the end of World War One. The Hashemite Kingdom of Syria led by King Faisal, a child of Sharif Husayn, endured in Syria until July 1920. Rashid Rida was a vociferous opponent of any kind of European rule over Syria and Iraq and strongly advocated for Arab independence. Midway through 1919, he made his way to Syria, where he was chosen to the Syrian National Congress as a representative of Tripoli and held the position of chairperson for a brief period of time. Additionally, he was elected deputy chairman of the Syro-Palesitinian Congress. Rida was a fervent supporter of "complete absolute total independence" and rose to prominence in Al-Fatat, a Pan-Arab organisation, which mobilised the Syrian drive for complete independence. Rida also took part in marches of the Committee for National Defense, the most radical political group and the biggest anti-French organisation in Syria.

=== Memorandum to Lloyd George ===
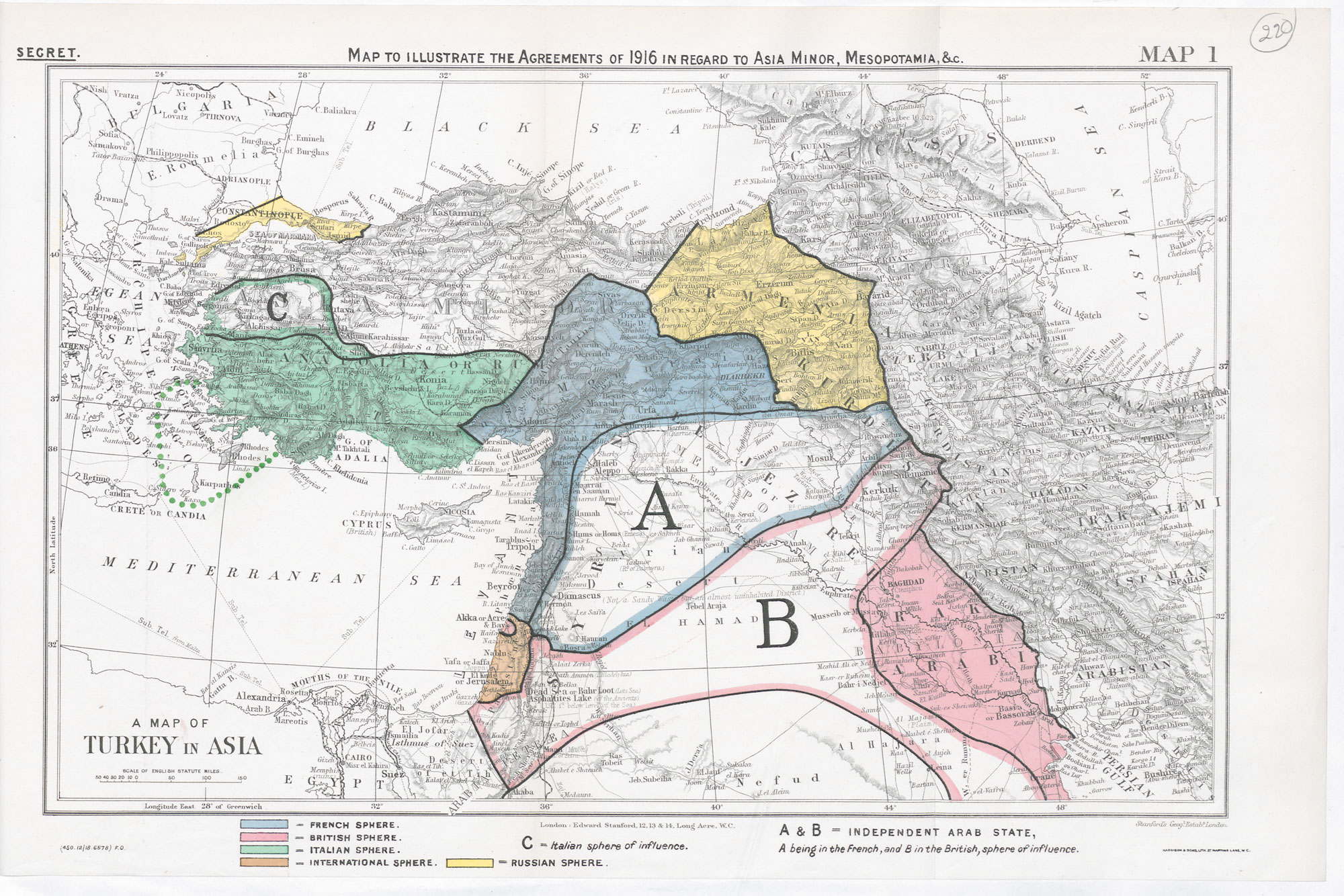
January 1919 British Foreign Office memorandum on modified Sykes-Picot agreement

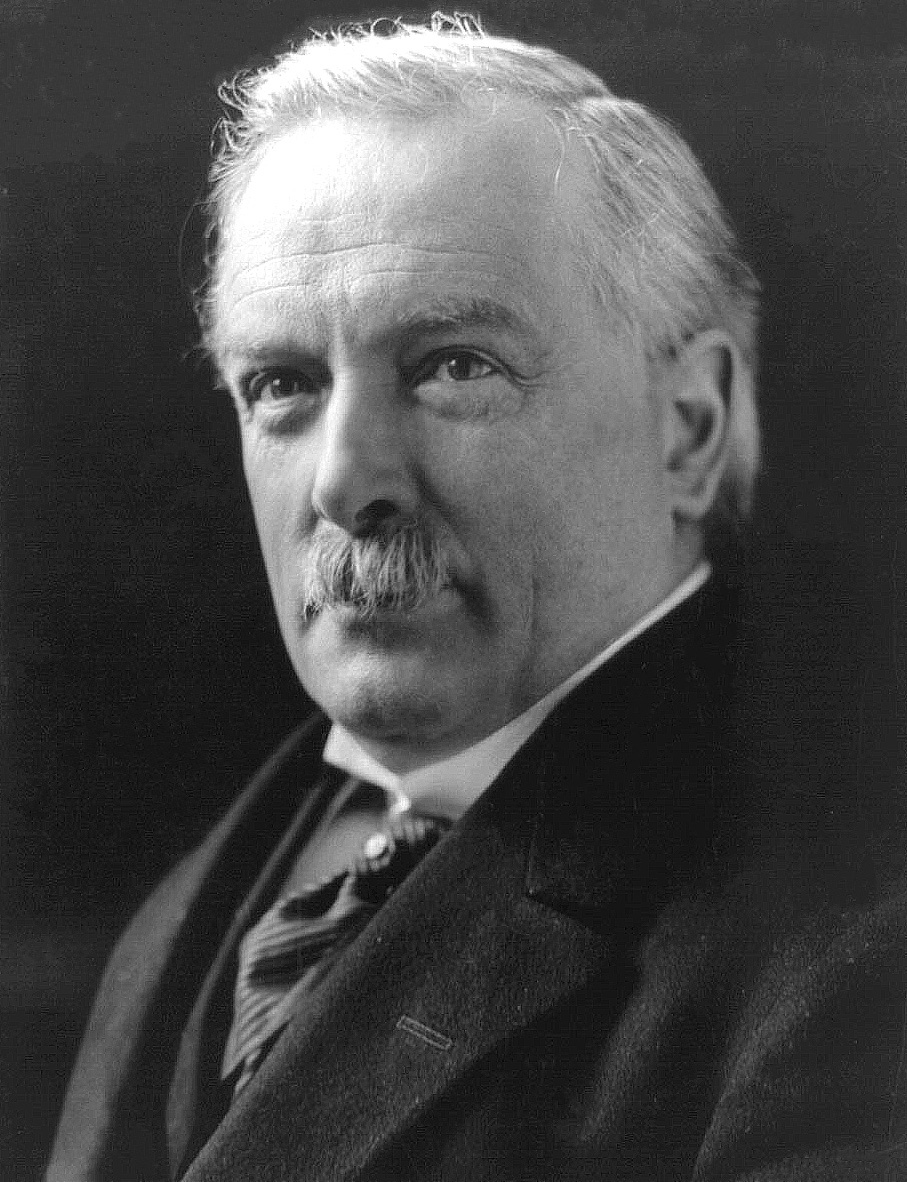
British Prime Minister David Lloyd George (1863–1945)

In a lengthy letter to British Prime Minister Lloyd George in June 1919, Rida underlined his stringent stance that a pan-Islamic administrative jurisdiction led by an Arab caliph should be sustained in order to rebuild the Arab World and also because "the good of the Arabs was the good of Islam." As soon as the Sykes-Picot Settlement became public, he denounced it as an attempt to eradicate Islam from the planet and said that European powers simply desired freedom, fairness, and dignity only for their Christian brethren. Lloyd was made aware of the widespread animosity toward the English prevalent in the Islamic World by Rida. He forewarned of a complete embargo of British trade together with Jihadi uprisings against British dominions throughout the Islamic lands, supported by Germans, should the ideas detailed in the Versailles Conference be put into action. The British could recover the goodwill of Muslims provided they chose to support Muslims at the Peace Summit and depart Syria and Iraq, even though Egyptians would have to keep fighting for their liberation. He expressed his readiness to visit Europe and advocate for Islamic causes. Rida wasn't welcomed, though, and his suggestions got yet again dismissed. Rashid Rida advocated for Arab-Turkish brotherhood and coordinated efforts against the common European danger during his activism in Syria in 1919–1920. The Turkish national movement's formative years were widely perceived as anything other than an Islamic religious uprising against the European invaders, and its membership mirrored its religious nature. Rida persisted in his belief that the Ottoman Caliphate was the only one that was currently valid and advocated an Arab-Turkish coalition to combat the danger presented by Europeans. Turkish nationalists and pan-Arabists were advocating for a confederacy of Syria, Iraq, and Turkey upon their liberation.

=== Disputes with Faysal ===
Similar to his parent Sharif Husayn, dictatorial impulses of Faysal in Syria ultimately set him towards a collision course against Sayyid Rashid Rida. Rida persisted in promoting the radical dream of a Pan-Islamic Arab state in the face of European invasion and the rise of independent Arab regimes. Even though Faysal had originally endorsed Rida's ideas, such as the Islamic-Arab Federation and rapprochement with Abd al-Aziz Ibn Saud of Najd, these attempts to bring together Faysal and different Syrian parties failed spectacularly. According to Rida, the country should be governed by Sharia; monitored by Islamic delegates (Ahl al-Hal wal-Aqd) elected to the General Syrian Congress. On the contrary, Faysal desired total power through the dissolution of the Congress and felt that it lacked the right to have any jurisdiction to check his power as king. Rida reminded Faysal that the Congress was indeed the primary governmental authority in the country, enforcing Sharia, and that the King was duty-bound to be deferential towards it in order to prevent despotism. Syrians shall never retreat to dictatorship, Rida warned Faysal, because "Unity can be achieved only by complying with the law". Faysal retorted that it was he who established the Congress and was unwilling to give it any power over him. Rida reacted angrily to his assertion and responded:

"No! The Congress created you. Before that, you were only a commander on behalf of Allenby, the supreme commander of the British army, and it was the Congress that made you King of Syria."

=== French invasion of Syria (1920) ===
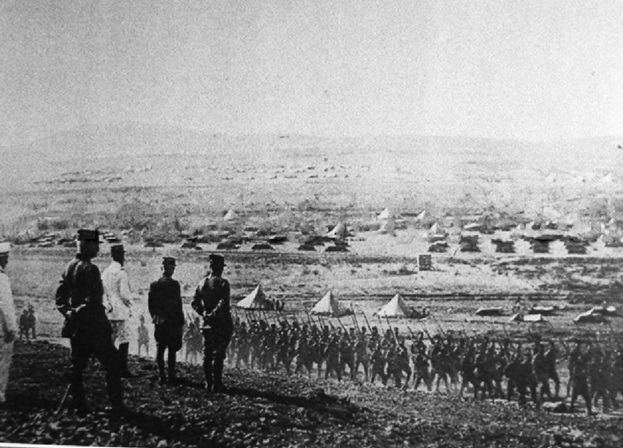
French General Henri Gouraud inspecting French imperial troops before the Battle of Maysalun

Rida was chosen to lead the Syrian Congress and was elected as its president in May 1920. But in the spring of 1920, the Allies amended their initial Sykes-Picot arrangement and proceeded to divide Syria and also the broader Fertile Crescent zone between each other under the guise of Mandates. This pitted the French into direct conflict with the Syrian Congress, which had declared the independence of Greater Syria (which included Palestine, Transjordan, and Lebanon) in March. On the 14th of July, French high commissioner in Beirut, General Henri Gouraud, threatened Faysal with a deadline, warning to occupy Syria with violence if he didn't unconditionally acknowledge the French mandate. Rida ardently objected and sought a military showdown with the French in the battlefield. However, Faysal dissented and would comply with the French demands, although his assent arrived late to the French. French armies launched an invasion of Syria during the summer; resulting in the Franco-Syrian War and crushed the Hashemite Kingdom by the 25th of July. Rida headed back to Egypt following the French occupation. A concurrent declaration by the Syro-Palestinian Congress, wherein Rida served as vice-chairman, was released in September 1921. It demanded the annulment of the pro-Zionist Balfour Declaration and emphasized the sovereignty of Syria, Lebanon, and Palestine as well as their desire to integrate. He publicly denounced Sharif Hussein and every one of his heirs during his addresses to the Syro-Palestinian Congress for their treasonous sell-out of Arab territories to colonial empires and abetting the British occupation of Palestine.

== Condemnation of the post-war world order ==
Rashid Rida's prior expectations for a righteous and impartial post-War global order were dashed by the terrible events that broke out throughout the Islamic World as a result of the imperialism of the victorious Allied powers done with little regard to their original pledges. As early as the spring of 1919, Rida had concluded that their post-war promises were "not intended for non-European nations." The defeats of 1919 Egyptian revolution and the French occupation of Syria would lead to the rise of a new phase of Islamist movements with a militant character led by Rashid Rida who rallied popular support with an anti-liberal, anti-Western agenda. He claimed that their political deceits, not their democratic or financial might, were what lead England to supremacy. By offering Palestine to Jews and simultaneously persuading Sharif Husayn to take Palestine on their behalf, their greatest deception involved winning the Americans over to their cause. Claiming that the British Empire had exploited the Jews through the Zionist programme as much as the Jewish elites manipulated the British; Rida branded Britain as "a cunning, deceitful nation." Covering these events closely in his influential Salafi religious journal Al-Manar, Rida condemned the peace conferences as worse than all the calamities of the war since "the rich, the strong, and the imperialists, who were the cause of this war, had reasserted their hold over other nations and people." The barbarity of the war, combined with the brutal betrayal of all the hopes and aspirations of freedom for the Arab World would plunge the region into further radicalisation, paving the way for militant Islamist movements like the Muslim Brotherhood. Condemning democratic values as hypocritical and designed to serve the interests of Western powers, Rashid Rida wrote:

"whenever the British exploited a people, there were voices in their press and parliament that denounced their government's action. These voices were a deceit intent on creating hope among the oppressed that the British oppressors would save them from their plight"

== Contemporary impact ==
Rida's fundamentalist theology and vocal anti-Western stances would inspire succeeding generations of Islamists like Hasan Al-Banna and Sayyid Qutb; who became important figures of the Egyptian Muslim Brotherhood movement. Almost a century after the Sykes-Picot Agreement signed by Britain and France, on June 30, 2014, Islamic State militants would announce the formation of a Worldwide Caliphate with the declared objective of erasing Middle East's national territories and boundaries drawn by the colonial powers since the Great War, and challenging the international order based on nation-state system. IS claimed that one of the goals of its insurgency was to reverse the effects of the Sykes-Picot Agreement and all state-borders; to establish a global Islamic State remodelled according to historical Arab empire of the Abbasids. Then-leader of the Islamic State, Abu Bakr al-Baghdadi, announced after the 2014 offensive:

"this blessed advance will not stop until we hit the last nail in the coffin of the Sykes-Picot conspiracy".

Some observers believe Islamic State's strategy was directly influenced by Rashid Rida's proposals. As a scholar who formed a link between the Wahhabi movement of Najd and the Muslim Brotherhood movement, Rida's works were avidly read by Abubakr al-Baghdadi. As part of his efforts to reconcile Arab and Turkish people to persuade them in forming an Islamic union with the goal to revive the Caliphate, Rashid Rida wrote his influential book al-Khilafa aw al-Imama al-‘Uzma (The Caliphate or the Exalted Imamate) which included a comprehensive program in rebuilding the Caliphate. In his treatise, Rida explained several steps that were needed to be undertaken for building a new system of caliphate. One of his suggestions were delineated in a chapter titled "Establishing the Caliphate in a Central Region", which proposed the establishment of a caliphate system in a limited area of the land, which would serve as a "central region" (Al-Mantiq Al-Wasat) to strategically manage the affairs of the surrounding lands. A just and eligible caliph was to be chosen from amongst the ulema, after shura(consultation).

Strikingly; Rida advised declaring the caliphate in Mosul, and did not suggest any Arab capital as a candidate for proclaiming the Caliphate. Rida saw Mosul as the "central region", which was intended to become the cradle of the project of Islamic caliphate, due to various strategic and cultural reasons. The "Islah Party" was to undertake the task of establishing the “Islamic State", restore respect for religion, guard Dar al-Islam (Muslim lands) and thus, demonstrate the might of Islam to the world. The strategic vision that guided Rashid Rida in choosing the location may have been the same for Al-Baghdadi and his fighters in their declaration of Caliphate on June 29, 2014.

== See also ==
- Sayyid Rashid Rida
- First World War
- Sykes-Picot Agreement
- Partition of the Ottoman Empire
