= Darkar =

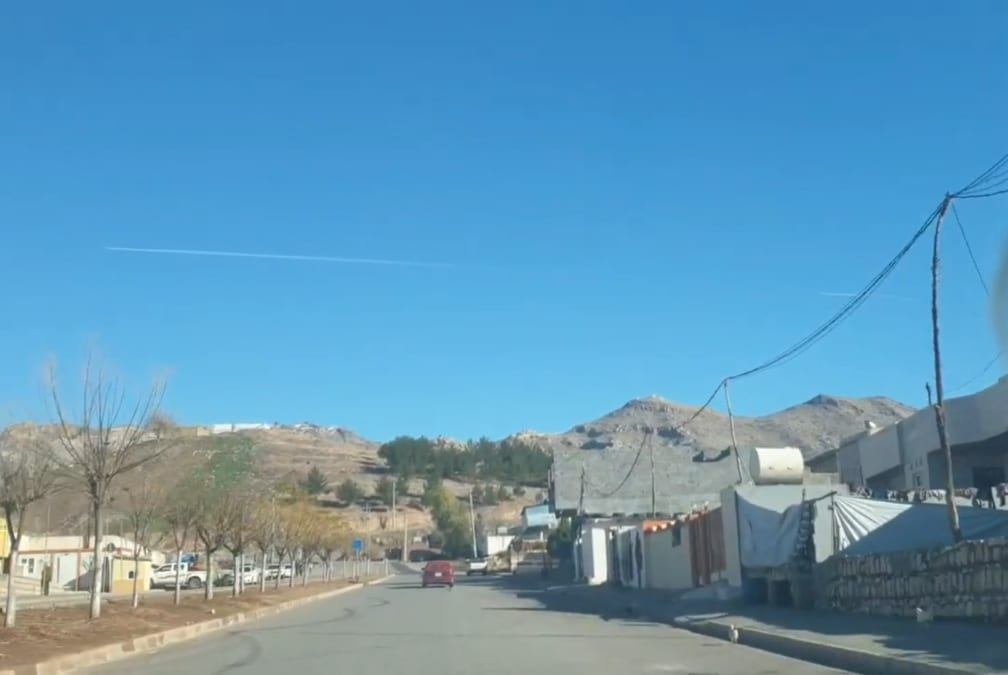

- Location in Iraq
- Coordinates: 37.1984137°N 42.8215742°E
- Country: Iraq
- Region: Kurdistan Region
- Governorate: Dohuk Governorate
- District: Zakho District
- Sub-district: Darkar

Darkar or Darkar Achem (Kurdish: دەركار عەجەم, Derkar Ecem) is one of the subdistricts of the Zakho District in Dohuk Governorate in Kurdistan Region of Iraq. The town is 15 km northeast of Zakho.

It has been the site of regular cross-border fighting with Turkey.

== Gallery ==
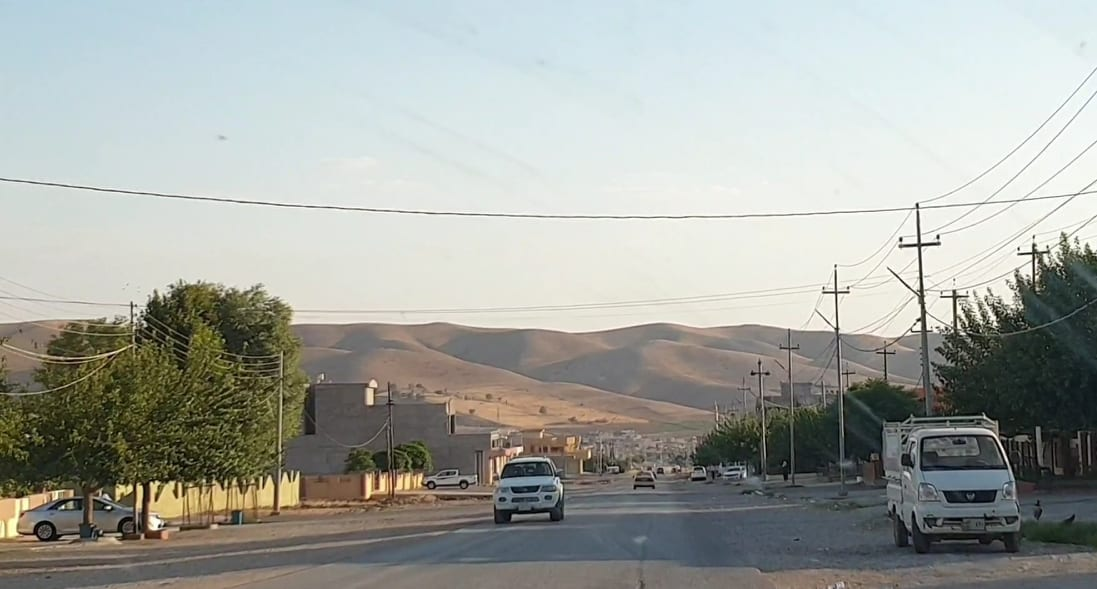

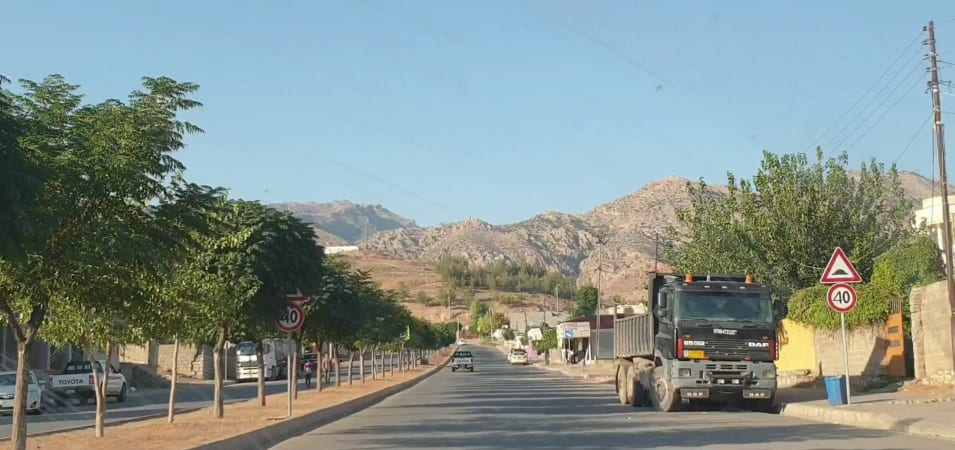
