= Batifa =

- District
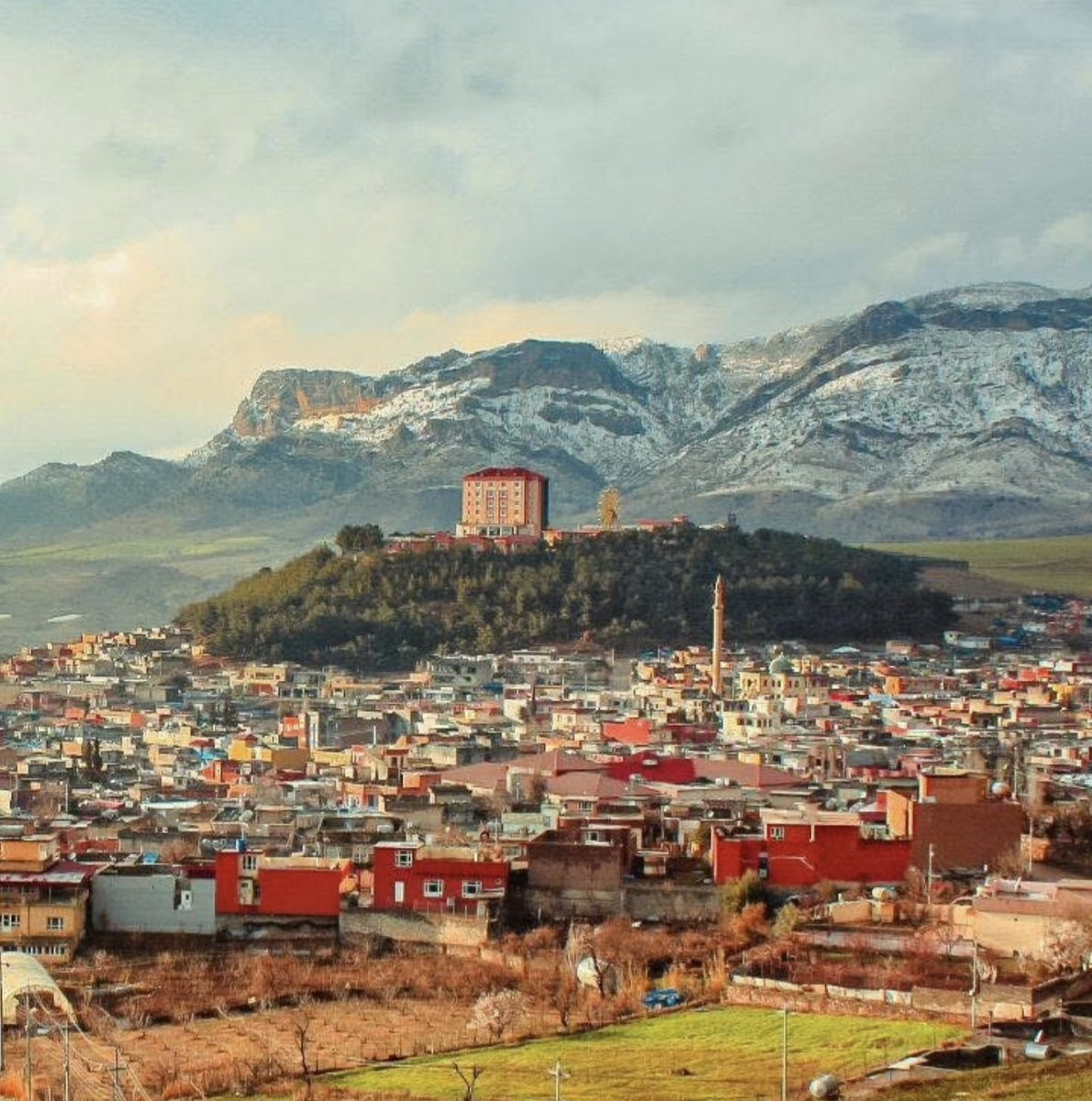

- Location in Iraq Batifa (Iraqi Kurdistan)
- Coordinates: 37.174372°N 43.013249°E
- Country: Iraq
- Region: Kurdistan Region
- Governorate: Dohuk Governorate
- District: Batifa

Population (2014)
  - Urban: 17,186
  - Rural: 5,665

Batifa (Arabic: باطوفا; Kurdish: باتيفا, romanized: Batîfa) is a town and district in Duhok Governorate in Kurdistan Region, Iraq. It was located in the Zakho District.

== Geography ==
=== Climate ===
Batifa has a hot-summer Mediterranean climate (Csa) with hot dry summers and cool, wet winters. Subfreezing lows are common in the winter, providing some frost. Snowfall may occur occasionally.

Climate data for Batifa
Month	Jan	Feb	Mar	Apr	May	Jun	Jul	Aug	Sep	Oct	Nov	Dec	Year
Mean daily maximum °C (°F)	7.7 (45.9)	9.4 (48.9)	13.7 (56.7)	19.1 (66.4)	26.3 (79.3)	33.3 (91.9)	37.7 (99.9)	37.5 (99.5)	33.2 (91.8)	25.3 (77.5)	16.8 (62.2)	9.8 (49.6)	22.5 (72.5)
Mean daily minimum °C (°F)	−0.6 (30.9)	0.3 (32.5)	3.7 (38.7)	8.1 (46.6)	13.2 (55.8)	18.2 (64.8)	22.2 (72.0)	21.7 (71.1)	17.6 (63.7)	11.8 (53.2)	6.2 (43.2)	1.5 (34.7)	10.3 (50.6)
Average precipitation mm (inches)	124 (4.9)	144 (5.7)	132 (5.2)	107 (4.2)	51 (2.0)	0 (0)	0 (0)	0 (0)	1 (0.0)	29 (1.1)	84 (3.3)	123 (4.8)	795 (31.2)
Source: Climate-Data

== See also ==
- Zembîlfiroş
- Grave of Zambil Froosh
