= Zakho District =

Zakho District قەزای زاخۆ ܪܘ݂ܣܬܵܩܵܐ ܕܙܵܟܼܘܿ
- District
- Location of Zakho in Iraq
- Coordinates (Zakho): 37°08′37″N 42°40′55″E
- Country: Iraq
- Region: Kurdistan Region
- Governorate: Dohuk
- Seat: Zakho
- Time zone: UTC+3 (AST)
- Area code: +964 62

Zakho District (Kurdish: قەزای زاخۆ, romanized: Qezaya Zaxo, Arabic: قضاء زاخو, romanized: qaḍāʾ Zāḫū) is a district in northwestern Dohuk Governorate in the Kurdistan Region of Iraq. The city of Zakho is the administrative center.

== Subdistricts ==
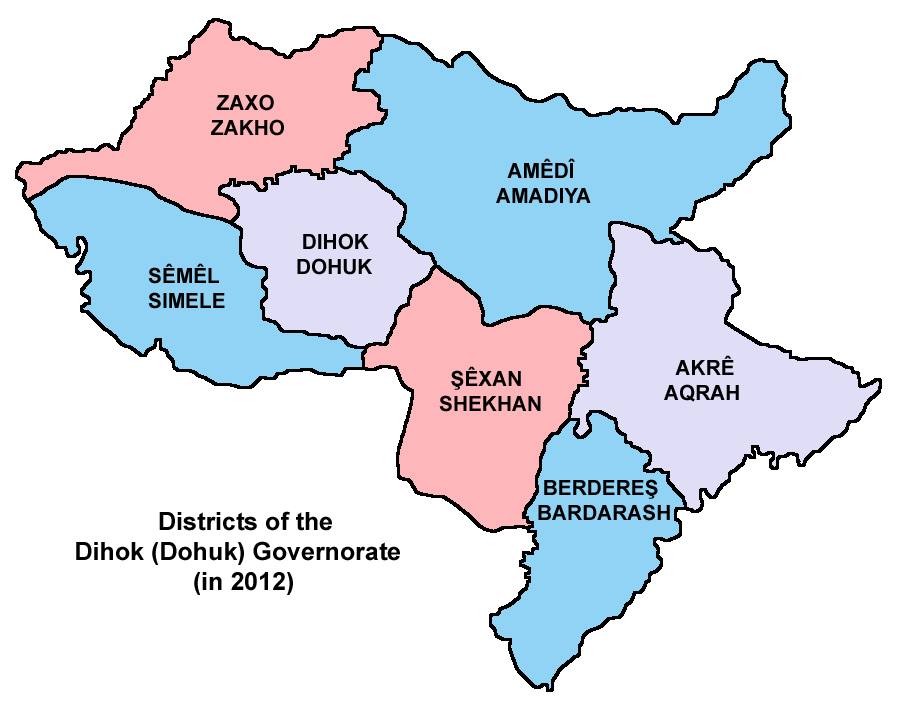
Districts of Dohuk Governorate (as of 2012)

The district has many sub-districts:

- Zakho
- Ibrahim Khalil
- Darkar
- Hizawa
- Batifa (became a district on 10-02-2021)
