= Alıçlı =

Alıçlı (literally "(place) with hawthorns") is a Turkish place name that may refer to the following places in Turkey:

- Alıçlı, Besni, a village in the district of Besni, Adıyaman Province
- Alıçlı, Kozluk, a village in the district of Kozluk, Batman Province
- Alıçlı, Ömerli, a village in the district of Ömerli, Mardin Province
- Alıçlı, Ulus, a village in the district of Ulus, Bartın Province
- Alıçlı, Yeşilli, a village in the district of Yeşilli, Mardin Province
- Alıçlık, Bayburt, a village in the district of Bayburt, Bayburt Province

== See also ==
- Alıç (disambiguation)
