= Freedom of religion in Syria =

The constitution of the Syrian Arab Republic guarantees freedom of religion. Syria has had two constitutions: one passed in 1973, and one in 2012 through the 2012 Syrian constitutional referendum. Opposition groups rejected the referendum; claiming that the vote was rigged.

Syria has come under international condemnation over its sectarian policies towards Syrian Sunnis, prohibition on religious groups like Jehovah's Witnesses, suppression of Protestant churches and for normalising antisemitic tropes through state media.

In 2023, the country was scored 2 out of 4 for religious freedom, with the government controlling the appointment of Muslim religious leaders.

In the same year, the country was ranked as the 12th most difficult place in the world to be a Christian.

== History of the constitutional clauses (1973) ==
=== Early Ba'athist rule: 1963–1970 ===
After a great deal of struggle between various groups for power, the Arab Socialist Ba'ath party seized power in Syria during the 1963 Syrian coup d'état. As an Arab socialist theoretician opposed to religion in general, the Ba'athist ideologue Michel Aflaq associated religion with the old corrupt social order, oppression, and exploitation of the weak; seeming to have been influenced by a mixture of radical Hobbesian and Marxist views.

Like Marxists, Syrian Ba'athist ideologues viewed religion as a tool used by traditional elites to oppress the weaker sections of the society and reinforce their conservative social order. Anti-religious propaganda has been a common ideological theme in the literature published by Syrian Ba'ath party. Militant secularism was emphasized in the "Declaration of Principles" manifesto published by the Ba'ath party in 1960; which declared that the party's "educational policy" was to build a "new generation of Arabs that believes in the unity of the nation and the eternity of its mission." Syrian Ba'athist documents regularly depicted religion as a social institution that advanced "the values of feudalism and imperialism". The manifesto also stated that this envisaged Ba'athist generation would be "committed to scientific thought freed from the shackles of superstition and backward customs" and replace religion with Arab nationalism as their belief system.

Despite the Ba'ath party's hardline anti-religious ideological stance, the Ba'athist Syrian constitution of 1964 stated in one of its clauses that "Islamic jurisprudence shall be the main source for legislation". Despite this proviso, there were a number of Sunni Muslims who felt that the secularization of the country had gone too far. They pressed for Islam as a state religion, demanding that all laws contrary to Islam should be abrogated. Their beliefs encompassed the understanding that the essential elements of the unity of Syria is the shari'a, which includes laws adequate to organize all aspects of life; at the level of the individual, the family, the nation and the state.

=== Salah Jadid's reign: 1966–1970 ===
After the 1966 Syrian coup d'état launched by the neo-Ba'athist faction led by Salah Jadid, the Ba'ath party postured itself as a strongly anti-religious political entity; adhering to the Marxist–Leninist approach of top-down regimentation of the society through liquidation of what it regarded as "reactionary" classes such as the traditional ulema. The Grand Mufti's official status was downgraded by the Ba'athist government and the conventional role of religious clergy in state functioning was curtailed. While state ministers, officials, educators, etc. regularly preached about the "perils of religion"; party periodicals and magazines during the 1960s regularly made predictions about the "impending demise" of religion through the socialist revolution.

During Salah Jadid's reign in power, neo-Ba'athist ideologues openly denounced religion as a source of what they considered as the backwardness of the Arabs. Jadid regime also banned religious preaching, restricted religious education, intensified government control of religious institutions and persecuted the religious clergy. Religious scholars and activists alleged to be critical of the Ba'ath regime were detained, tortured or killed by the Ba'athist secret police.

=== Assadist rule: 1970–2024 ===
Following popular revulsion against Jadid's blatant anti-religious policies, Hafez al-Assad began to tone down the secularisation programme during the 1970s, by co-opting some pro-government clerics like Ramadan al-Bouti to counter the Islamic opposition and granted them a degree of autonomy from the regime. Simultaneously, the regime began the "nationalization" of religious discourse through a loyal clerical network, and condemned anyone deviating from the state-promoted "Ba'thist version of Islam" as a threat to the society. The state-sponsored religious discourse during the rule of Hafez al-Assad promoted a left-wing nationalist worldview that sought to anathematize Islamists and re-inforce loyalty towards the Alawite president.

In 1973, a new constitution was drafted after demands from the opposition for stricter Islamic law. The Constitution was adopted by the People's Council at the end of January 1973 but had no provision to that effect. Viewing the Constitution as the product of an Alawite-dominated, secular, Ba'athist ruling elite, Sunni militants staged a series of riots in February 1973 in conservative and predominantly Sunni cities such as Hamah and Homs. Numerous demonstrators were killed or wounded in clashes between the troops and demonstrators. After these demonstrations took place, the Assad government had the draft charter amended to include a provision that the President of Syria must be Muslim, and that Islamic law is a main source of legislation as a compromise to the Islamists. On March 13, 1973, the new Constitution (which is no longer applicable, having been amended in 2012) went into effect.

The religion of the President of the Republic has to be Islam. Islamic jurisprudence is a main source of legislation.

Paragraph 2 of Article 3 declares that Islamic jurisprudence is "a" source of law, but not "the" absolute source. Bernard Botiveau notes that from a Ba'athist perspective "Islam was one of the fundamental components of Arabness, but required to be located at the religious, and not the political end." Sunni Shaykh Muhammad al-Habash interprets the provision to mean that it "refers to the situation where there is another source of law. Islam is a main source, but not the unique source. There are other sources for a wide area of law." Scholarly commentator Nael Georges supposes that if there is no Islamic law that regulates a specific circumstance, secular law is applied. However, Georges concludes that there is not strict separation between Islam and the state in its present constitutional setup. Despite this Article in the Constitution, Syria identifies itself as secular, and does not follow Islamic law. In Bashar al-Assad's speech in 2013, he reaffirmed his commitment to keeping Syria a secular state.

== Religious and ethnic landscape ==
Syria's eighteen million population is a mosaic of ethnically, culturally, and religiously distinct communities. Ninety percent of the Syrians adhere to an Arab identity; another roughly nine percent is Kurdish, Armenian, Circassian, and Turkomans filling out the mix. It is estimated that Sunni Muslims make up seventy-four percent of Syria's overall population. As such, Sunnis provide the central symbolic and cultural orientation. Of these, a minority are of Kurdish descent, reducing the core Sunni Arab majority to roughly two-thirds of the populace. Approximately another sixteen percent of the population, while Arab in ethnicity, consists of a few Twelver Shi`a, and various offshoots of Shi'a Islam – Alawite, Druze, and Isma'ilis. The 'Alawis are by far the largest community in the category of non-Sunni Muslims. Their number is estimated at eleven percent of the overall population. Christians, of various Eastern Orthodox and Uniate traditions and the Latin Rite, along with a smattering of Protestants, make up ten percent of the population. Syria's Arab Jewish community has, to a great extent, disappeared as a result of emigration in the early 1990s. In 1993, it was reported that there were 3,655 individuals of the Jewish faith comprising 584 families distributed throughout the various Syrian governantes.

== Religious clauses are constitutionally entrenched ==
The Constitution of the Syrian Arab Republic that was passed in 2012 guaranteed religious freedom in Article 3 and Article 33. Article 3 stipulates:

The State shall respect all religions, and ensure the freedom to perform all the rituals that do not prejudice public order; The personal status of religious communities shall be protected and respected.

Despite claiming to be a secular state, the 2012 constitution also states in Article 3 that the President must be a Muslim, and that the majority of laws will based on Islam. Despite being prevalent in the constitution, Syria is seen as a secular state without having its laws based on Islam.

The religion of the President of the Republic is Islam; Islamic jurisprudence shall be a major source of legislation;...

== Personal status laws ==
In Syria, two kinds of judicial systems exist: a secular and a religious one. Secular courts hear matters of public, civil and criminal law. Religious courts that exercise specialized jurisdiction are divided into shari'a courts, doctrinal courts, and spiritual courts. They hear personal status law cases only. Shari'a courts regulate disputes among Syrian Muslims, whereas doctrinal courts are empowered to guarantee the personal status decisions of members of the Druze faith. Spiritual courts can also settle personal status matters for Jewish, Christian and other non-Muslim groups. Decisions of all of the religious courts may be appealed to the canonical and spiritual divisions of the Court of Cassation.

However, in 2016 the de facto autonomous Federation of Northern Syria - Rojava for the first time in Syrian history introduced and started to promote civil marriage as a move towards a secular open society and intermarriage between people of different religious backgrounds.

== Public endowments ==
The second preponderant element of collective religious self-determination under Article 35 of the Syrian Constitution is the ability to manage and control public waqf. Making available the waqf institution is not so much a new innovation of the Syrian state, but all the more a continuation of an ancient practice which has its roots in Byzantine and Sasanian trust law. Mainly the Umayyads and the Ottomans developed what can nowadays be seen as constitutional custom. For historians the waqf institution provided the foundation for much of what is considered Islamic civilization.

=== Islamic waqf ===
In 1947 the Syrian waqf administration, headed by the prime minister, was formed. For the first time in Syrian history, the members of the High Council of Awqaf were nominated and not voted for. The law was later reversed, as in the year 1961, and a new statutory source came into effect. Parts of the council's initial authority were definitely curtailed in 1965. The competences to nominate leaders and teachers of mosques as well as religious administrators were eventually transferred to the powers of the Syrian Prime Minister in 1966.
In spite of that, notable Sunni Islamic leaders retained their influence in the waqf administration and Ministry in that they were given important offices. Today, the competences of the waqf Ministry encompass, inter alia: the administration of waqf wealth (which includes much of Syria's property); mufti organization; administration of mosques and shari'a schools; control of charitable state functions; and the preparation of parliamentary bills. The waqf administration as part of the waqf Ministry, is composed half of secular and half of religious personnel. Its minister is nominated by the President of the Syrian Arab Republic. Since the establishment of the Ministry, waqf ministers have always been adherents of Sunni Islam.

=== Non-Muslim waqf ===
Non-Muslim waqf – those of the Druze, Christians, and Jews – were not included under the French programme and mandate reforms. Non-Muslim waqf continue to be administered by the leaders of the respective religious community, but is overseen by the waqf Ministry. Act No. 31 of 2006 contains an entire body of legal provisions regulating the waqf institution of the Catholic rites. Similar Acts were adopted for all non-Muslim waqf institutions. Many Christian or Jewish founders of pious trusts donated the revenues to their non-Muslim institutions. This kind of public waqf pays for the construction and maintenance of churches, schools, or the salaries of their personnel. Waqf revenues likewise pay for religious orders and other religious constructions and buildings such as cemeteries and tombs. Waqf funds are used for libraries, translation centres, and students' scholarships. Orphanages, needs of widows, the blind or other handicapped or poor people are all cared for with waqf money.

== Adoption, change, and renunciation of religion ==
Syrians are free to engage or refrain from engaging in belief or religious observance in any manner other than is prohibited by law. Article 35(1) of the Syrian constitution holds that: "Freedom of faith is guaranteed [...]." The provision includes the freedom to retain or choose one's religion, or to replace the current religion with another, or to adopt atheistic views. There is no official legal punishment under Syrian law for apostasy of Islam, or any other religion. Article 35(2) of the Syrian Constitution stipulates that "the state guarantees the freedom to hold any religious rites [...]," as long as "they [the apostates] do not disturb public order." As far as can be established, there is no Syrian case tying apostasy to "disturbing public order." The provision is interpreted by scholarly means in the sense that a person who wishes to convert is free to do so as long as such activity is "made in private." The meaning of the words "in private" in association with the requirement not to "disturb public order" need to be looked at from two varying angles: converting from a specific religion to another religion; and vice versa.

=== Conversion away "from" Islam ===
A Muslim is disallowed by virtue of Islamic jurisprudence to challenge society. Former Judge Haitham Maleh comments, "any Syrian Muslim is allowed to change his religion provided that conversion is exercised behind closed doors and without affecting neighbours." Judge Maleh reiterates more specifically, "an effect must not even be felt by the closest family members." This can be construed as a condemnation of publicly announcing a change in religion; although no case exists of a person being charged for publicly converting to a different religion. However, an apostate from a religion has no legal right to speak about or act upon his or her new belief. The word "private" means the forum internum of a person. This interpretation approach is also reflected, for instance, in the general inability to change a Muslim's birth certificate or other personal documents. Moreover, it is a generally accepted practice that there are no religious ceremonies for such personal, highly intimate events.
The primary listed reason why Syrian Muslims cannot change their religion is not the passive role of the state, but Syrian society. Father Paolo Dall'Oglio comments "freedom of religion is virtually unthinkable with regard to the cultural role religion plays in everyday Syrian society." He opines that the "replacing of one's current religion would not only mean the complete loss of one's social ties, including one's own family, friends, and acquaintances, but maybe also professional position." From this perspective there are no legal but a fortiori social sanctions. Islamic scholar Jørgen S. Nielsen says in the same regard "the state obviously discourages it because it simply rocks the boat."
However, the desire to adopt a new religion is a relatively rare phenomenon. Father Paolo believes that "there are only a few such cases."

In Syria, the often-cited Hadith Sahih al-Bukhari is of no direct legal effect. The Hadith demand, "if someone changes the religion you have to kill him" is not incorporated into the Syrian Penal Code of 1949. Judge Maleh argues that the idea of Sahih al-Bukhari in 9:57 was "to protect the Islamic society from Muslims who change their religion and start to work as enemies against Islam." Shaykh al-Habash muses similarly "maybe Prophet Muhammad mentioned it for someone who changed his religion and began to fight as an enemy against Islam at that moment in history." Al-Habash cannot accept it as tradition that generally applies to all people changing from one religion to another, even in the case of Islam. To him, this tradition is not part of the precious Qur'an, but "is a statement made by Prophet Muhammad and was later narrated by the people." Finally, Shaykh al-Habash emphasizes, "ninety-nine percent of all Syrian Muslims believe that it is forbidden to use force against others."

=== Conversion "to" Islam ===
Conversion to Islam is similarly regarded as private affair with one significant difference. Rule No. 212 of the Personal Status Act of 1953 holds that when a Muslim woman marries a non-Muslim man, Islam is offered to the husband. Moreover, the same rule reads, if he becomes Muslim his change in faith, it is written down in their marriage contract. But if he declines, the judge should keep them apart. In cases other than interfaith relationships, the act of conversion to Islam is not state institutionalized. Conversion from a Christian sect to another Christian sect or Islam, while legal, is also problematic. Negative implications are felt on one's social ties including relations with family, friends and acquaintances. Patriarch Ignatius IV expressed his aversion to community members who adopt the faith of another Christian rite, by stating:

There are new sects coming from Europe and America to Syria. As long as they are of Christian faith they are subject to few limitations. From the Greek-Orthodox point of view we dislike them, because not only are they involved in missionary work, but divide us as a Christian community. We are fully against any division, we want to stay visible. Our belief is that Jesus comes from Bethlehem, and not from London or New York.

== Situation of minority groups ==
Membership in the Syrian Muslim Brotherhood is illegal, as is membership in any organization accused to be "Salafist", a designation in the Assad government's parlance to denote Saudi-inspired fundamentalism. The Syrian government and the State Security Court have not defined the exact parameters of what constitutes a Salafist or why it is illegal. Affiliation with the Syrian Muslim Brotherhood is punishable by death, although in practice the sentence is typically commuted to 12 years imprisonment.

All religions, religious orders, political groups, parties, and news organizations must register with the government, which monitors fund raising and requires permits for all religious and non-religious group meetings; with the exception of worship. The registration process is complicated and lengthy, but the government usually allows groups to operate informally while awaiting its response. This was re-affirmed in the 2012 constitution.

There is a de facto separation of religion and state in that the Syrian government generally refrains from involvement in strictly religious matters and religious groups tend not to participate in internal political affairs. However, Syria has increased its support for the practice and study of government-sanctioned, moderate forms of Islam, and Syrian state radio also began broadcasting the dawn and afternoon Muslim prayers, in addition to its traditional broadcast of noon prayers. Syrian state television also broadcasts recitations from the Qur'an in the morning.

Syria permits the use of religious language in public spaces, including the placement of banners bearing religious slogans at the site of prominent public landmarks during religious holidays. However, there have been no recent examples of prominent religious figures addressing government functions.

Syria's government policy officially disavows sectarianism of any kind, although religion can be a key factor in determining career opportunities. For example, Alawites hold dominant positions in the security services and military that are extremely disproportionate to their percentage of the population. Also, Jehovah's Witnesses are discriminated against in the area of employment as their religion is banned as a "politically motivated Zionist organization".

The April 2007 parliamentary elections for the Syrian Peoples Assembly saw an increase in the number of Islamic clerics elected to the Parliament from one in 2003 to three.

The government promotes Islamic banking. In early 2007 two Islamic banks were allowed to conduct initial public offerings: The Cham Islamic Bank and the Syria International Islamic Bank.

Syrian regime is intolerant of, and suppresses, what it deems as extremist and conservative forms of Islam. Accordingly, it selects what they believe to be "moderate Muslims" for religious leadership positions. These people typically have no intention of altering the secular nature of the government and are highly supportive of Assad . Ahmad Badreddin Hassoun, the Grand Mufti of Syria, continued to call on Muslims to stand up to Islamic fundamentalism and has urged leaders of the various religious groups to engage in regular dialogues for mutual understanding.

All schools are officially government-run and non-sectarian, although in practice some schools are run by the Christian and Druze communities. There is mandatory religious instruction in schools for all religious groups, with government-approved teachers and curriculum; religious instruction is provided on Islam and Christianity only, and courses are divided into separate classes for Muslim and Christian students. Groups that participate in Islamic courses include Sunni, Shi'a, Alawi, Ismaili, Yezidi, and Druze. Although Arabic is the official language in public schools, the government permits the teaching of Armenian, Hebrew, and Aramaic in some schools on the basis that these are "liturgical languages." There is no mandatory religious study at the university level.

Religious groups are subject to their respective religious laws for matters dealing with personal status. Syria has not yet passed legislation pertaining to personal status issues for Orthodox Christians.

A new Civil Law for Catholics went into effect in 2006. It contains strict rules on the order of inheritance with regard to the relatives of the deceased, as well as on the jurisdiction of Christian courts. Additionally, there are laws that establish the legal marriage age and prohibit some instances of mixed marriage for Catholics, according to AsiaNews, the official press agency of the Roman Catholic Pontifical Institute for Foreign Missions. The law gives the bishop of a diocese and the Christian courts expanded authority to determine the validity of an adoption. The new law also clarifies parental rights and inheritance rules between adopting parents and the adopted child. The Catholic leadership generally received the law positively.

Syrian law specifically provides for reduced or commuted sentences in "honor crimes", which involve violent assaults by a direct male relative against a female. Section 548 of the Syrian penal code stipulates that a man can be absolved of any killing if he witnesses a direct female relative in the act of adultery. Moreover, a man's sentence for murder will be greatly reduced if he sees a direct female relative in a "suspicious situation" with a member of the opposite sex who is not a relative.

Under Syria's interpretation of Shari'a, the legal standard for men to be granted a divorce is much lower than that for women. Husbands may also claim adultery as grounds for divorce, while wives often face a higher legal standard when presenting the same case. A man can only be found guilty of adultery if the act takes place inside the home. If a wife requests a divorce from her husband, she may be denied alimony and the return of her dowry in some instances.

In the event of divorce, a woman loses the right to custody of her sons when they reach the age of 13, and her daughters when they reach the age of 15, regardless of religion. Women can also lose custody before this age if they remarry, work outside the home, or move outside of the city or country. In such cases the custody of the children reverts to the maternal grandmother until the age of 13 and 15 respectively. After that, custody reverts to the father until the children reach the age of majority.

Inheritance for all citizens except Catholics is based on Shari'a. Accordingly, married women usually are granted half the inheritance share male heirs receive. In all communities, however, male heirs must provide financial support to unmarried female relatives who inherit less. For example, a brother would inherit his and his unmarried sister's share from their parents' estate, and he is obligated to provide for the sister's well-being with that inheritance. If the brother fails to do so, she has the right to sue. Polygamy is legal for Muslim men but is practised only by a minority of them.

The Syrian government generally does not prohibit links between its citizens and co-religionists in other countries or between its citizens and the international hierarchies that govern some religious groups. It does however prohibit contact between the Jewish community and Jews in Israel.

The following holy days are national holidays: Western Christmas, Orthodox and Western Easter, Eid al-Adha, Eid al-Fitr, the Islamic New Year, and the Birth of the Prophet Muhammad.

=== Restrictions on religious freedom ===
In 2007, Syria licensed the so-called Quabasis to hold their female-only Islamic study groups inside of mosques. Until then, they were held in private homes. Some regard the licensing as a cynical attempt by the security services to make it easier to monitor the Quabasis rather than to help facilitate their activities. However, Quabasis groups were still allowed to meet in private residences.

The era of d'tente between the religious establishment and the ruling Ba'athist elites came to an end in 2008, when Bashar al-Assad appointed Muhammad al-Sayyid as Chief of the Ministry of Awqaf, which marked an era of harsh regulations in the religious landscape. Numerous private religious educational institutes, religious charities, independent preaching organisations, female religious centres, etc. were forcibly shut down as part of a revamped state-sponsored secularization drive. The state also tightened its grip over the official religious institutions and dissident Islamic voices were imprisoned, leading to open rift with the ulema. Private religious institutes were allowed donations only after official permission from the Ministry of Awqaf, which also controlled the expenditures. The state was also entrusted with a broad range of powers including the hiring and firing of its instructors as well as the standardisation of their religious curriculum with the Ba'thist religious policy advocated by the Assad government, effectively nationalising the private religious institutes.

In 2009, Ba'ath party activists launched ideological campaigns against the Niqab (Islamic face veils) and alleged "extremist trends" in the society, which was complemented by the regime's revamped clampdown on religious activists, independent religious scholars and private schools. Popular display of religious symbols of all religious sects was banned in 2010 and officials close to the ulema were suspended by the Assad government, under the pretext of preserving the "secular character" of the country. The regime also implemented nation-wide ban on the Niqab (face-covering) and imposed restrictions on female Islamic organisations like the Al-Qubaisiat, which ignited a region-wide controversy. By the onset of Arab Spring in late 2010, relationship between the ulema and the Assad regime had sunk to its lowest level, with even staunch Assad-loyalists like the Grand Mufti Ramadan al-Bouti expressing public discontent.

Proselytism is not prohibited by civil law; however, the government discourages it as a potential threat to the relations among religious groups. Nevertheless, foreign missionaries were present; operating discreetly. There were no reported cases of anyone being prosecuted for posing a threat to the relations among religious groups in recent years. Instead, there were several reports that Syria gave the Shi'a favorable treatment and allowed Shi'a missionaries to construct mosques and convert Sunnis to Shiites.

All groups, religious and non-religious, are subject to surveillance and monitoring by government security services. The Government particularly considers militant Islam a threat to the government and closely follows the practice of its adherents. While the Syrian government allows many mosques to be built, in 2022 it monitored and controlled sermons and often closes mosques between prayers.

Religious minorities, with the exception of Jews, are represented among the senior officer corps. In keeping with the Syria's secular policy, though, the military does not have a chaplain corps; members of the military do not have direct access to religious or spiritual support; and soldiers are expected not to express their faith overtly during work hours. For example, Muslims are discouraged from praying while on duty. Syria canceled an Islamic religious program that had been broadcast just before the major weekly prayers were shown on government-run television. On April 20, 2007, the son of the late Grand Mufti, Sheikh Salah Khuftaro, in a speech at the Abu Nur Islamic Center, denounced the Information Minister for this decision.

Since 2000, Protestant Christians are also victims of a renewed state-led clampdown on its churches and religious services. The regime's policies target both foreign-affiliated religious organisations as well as independent regional churches and religious educational centres.

=== Repression of Islamists ===
Before the 2011 revolution, European diplomats and human rights organizations around the world characterized the level of repression against alleged Islamists as consistent throughout the years, with discrimination neither increasing nor decreasing. Some religious leaders insisted they faced increased repression at the hands of the Syrian government, however.

Human rights organizations documented the arrest of at least 30 persons for alleged ties to Islamist groups. The Government rarely furnishes documentation on the number of detained persons. Human rights groups have reported on the amount Syrians who have been arrested or detained for alleged ties to Islamist groups in previous years but whose detention have not been confirmed nor denied by the government.

Since 2007, the Syrian Supreme State Security Court has sentenced at least 22 alleged Islamists to lengthy prison sentences.

Syria continues to hold an unknown number of members of the Muslim Brotherhood and other Islamists as political detainees and prisoners. Many alleged Islamists not connected to the Muslim Brotherhood have been charged and convicted for membership in a Salafist organization. Arrests of alleged Islamists and, in some cases, convictions, were motivated primarily by the Syrian government's view of militant Islamists as potential threats to government stability.

=== Syrian Jews ===
In 2007, the small Jewish community was prohibited from sending historical Torahs abroad under a law against exporting any of the country's historical and cultural treasures, leading to concerns about the preservation of its ancient religious texts. In 2020, the Jewish Chronicle reported that there were no known Jews left in Syria.

=== Improvements and positive developments in respect for religious freedom ===
On June 24, 2007, Syrian Grand Mufti Sheikh Ahmad Badreddin Hassoun called on Jews of Syrian origin to return to Syria, claiming that the property and synagogues of Jews who left Syria remained as they were and would be placed at the disposal of their original owners. There have been no noticeable increase of Jews in Syria since, with no change in the discrimination and barring from the work force that those of the Jewish faith.

On 14 March 2007, during a lecture at Damascus University, Syrian Grand Mufti Sheikh Ahmad Badreddin Hassoun called for amending the laws that allow honor killings, which he said violate the Islamic spirit of the law.

=== Religious freedom since the revolution ===
During the course of the Syrian civil war, Assad regime's crackdown on religious dissidents have increased, particularly those of Sunni background, over allegations of sympathies with rebel groups. In November 2021, Bashar banished the office of Grand Mufti of Syria.

Since the uprising began in Syria, the country has grown increasingly sectarian, with a sharp divide between Alawites and Shia fundamentalist groups generally supporting the government, and Sunni Muslims and Palestinian refugees generally supporting the Free Syrian Army. The presence of Jews in Syria is almost non-existent, and they have not played a significant role in the revolution.

Syrian Sunnis became subject to relentless persecution and discrimination from the Alawite dominated Baathist apparatus; since the party associates them of being linked with the Syrian opposition. As a result, Syria's Sunni community has endured vast majority of the brutalities, ethnic cleansing, massacres and other war crimes perpetrated by the Syrian Arab Army and pro-Assad Alawite militias throughout the course of the deadly Syrian Civil War.

=== Societal abuses and discrimination ===
There have been occasional reports of minor tensions between religious groups, mainly attributable to economic rivalries rather than religious affiliation.

In March 2007 there were reports of riots in Al-Hasakah Governorate between Christians and predominantly Muslim Kurds. There were reports of three deaths. It was unclear whether there was any religious basis to the conflict.

No official statistics were kept on honor crimes, but there were scattered reports of them in the local media. Most prominent was the case of Zahra Ezzo. On January 31, 2007, Ezzo was murdered by her brother after being kidnapped and forced to run away by a friend of the family. The incidence of honor crimes is believed to be considerably higher in rural areas.

Social conventions and religious and theological proscriptions made conversion relatively rare, especially Muslim-to-Christian conversion. In many cases, societal pressure forced such converts to relocate within the country or leave the country to practice their new religion openly.

=== Banning of head and face coverings ===
On 21 July 2010, the government in Damascus ordered the banning of face-covering niqab in public and private universities amid fears of increasing Islamic extremism among young Muslim students; with hundreds of teachers wearing niqabs were transferred out of Syrian schools and universities and reassigned to administrative jobs, where they would not come into contact with students. In October 2022, large protests were held in northeastern Syria in the areas controlled by the Syrian Democratic Forces (SDF) following the imposition of a ban on students donning the niqab and called for the ban to be ended.
