= Bülbül, Yeşilli =

Village in Mardin Province, Turkey

Bülbül
- Neighbourhood
- Location within Turkey
- Coordinates: 37.314°N 40.838°E
- Country: Turkey
- Province: Mardin
- District: Yeşilli
- Population (2021): 67
- Time zone: UTC+3 (TRT)

Bülbül (Note: "Nightingale" in Turkish.) (Kurdish: Binêbil; Syriac: Banābīl) (Note: Also known as Banabil, Benabil, Bénébil, Benebil, Benibil, Binebil, Bnabil, Bnāy-Īl, Bna Bil, Bnailbil, Bnēbīl, Bnebil, Bnebile, Bülbülköy, or Bülbülkoyu.) is a neighbourhood in the municipality and district of Yeşilli, Mardin Province in Turkey. The village is populated by Syriacs and had a population of 67 in 2021. They speak the Mardin dialect of Arabic. It is located in the historic region of Tur Abdin.

== History ==
Banābīl (today called Bülbül) is named after the Roman fortress (κάστρα) of Benabelon or Banabela (Greek: Βαναβήλων, romanized: Banabelon), identified with the ruined castle of Numan Bey Kalesi or Kalat Numan Beg located southeast of the village. Benabelon is mentioned by the 7th-century geographer George of Cyprus in Descriptio Orbis Romani. It is believed that Benabelon was particularly significant in the Late Roman period. Benabelon belonged to the province of Mesopotamia and the district of Dara at the time of George of Cyprus. Banābīl was historically inhabited by Syriac Orthodox Christians. The Monastery of Mar Stephen, also called the Bukhre or Bokhre (the First-Born), at Banābīl was renovated by Yuhanna, metropolitan of Mardin, in the mid-12th century. He also built a small church in the village.

14 deacons and 2 priests were ordained for the Church of Morī Ya‛qūb at Banābīl in 1573–1585. The village was inhabited by 600 Syriac families in the 16th century. 9 deacons and 3 priests were ordained for the Monastery of Ḥbīštō or of Morī Barṣawm and Morī Bihnām in 1573–1672. In the Syriac Orthodox patriarchal register of dues of 1870, it was recorded that the village had 69 households, who paid 103 dues, and had one priest. Patriarch Ignatius Peter IV (r. 1872–1894) endowed the Mor Hananyo Monastery with nine orchards at Banābīl in 1891. The village was targeted in a pogrom on 9 November 1895. It was located in Mardin merkez kaza (central district) in the Mardin sanjak in the Diyarbekir vilayet in c. 1900. There were Syriac Orthodox churches of Mor Quryaqos, Mort Shmuni, and Mar Gurgis.

In 1910, Muslims from Reshmel built a small mosque by the River Nahrasa near Banābīl on territory that did not belong to Reshmel. Upon learning of the mosque, men from Banābīl secretly demolished it in a single night and planted and irrigated barley on the same spot using a hastily built aqueduct from the river. The mullah of Reshmel complained about the missing mosque to the Pasha of Mardin, who visited Banābīl and dismissed the complaint after having concluded that the village was entirely populated by Christians and that barley was growing at the location of the alleged mosque. Ḥannā, son of Qas Shamʿūn, was ordained as diyāqūs (servant of the church) for the Church of the Virgin Mary at Banābīl on 12 June 1330 AH by Metropolitan Ilyās. Banābīl was populated by 300 Syriacs in 1914, according to the list presented to the Paris Peace Conference by the Assyro-Chaldean delegation.

Amidst the Sayfo, the villagers became aware of the massacres of Christians in June 1915 following the arrival of refugees from Ma’sarte and Bafayya. The women and children were sent to the Mor Hananyo Monastery whilst the men armed themselves and took up positions in the vineyards and the orchards. Banābīl was besieged by Ghamrian Kurds from Mahmoudkiye and the Reshmel Mhallami, who made camp atop a hill overlooking the village, on 9 or 10 June and the first battle took place on 17 or 30 June. After having made contact with the Omeran Kurdish leader Khalil Ghazale, 60 Kurdish warriors were sent to protect the village. 18 Ottoman soldiers also arrived at the village ostensibly to guard the village. According to Abed Mshiho Neman of Qarabash, who saw the battle from the roof of the Mor Hananyo Monastery, Banābīl was attacked by 5000 Kurds whilst the Syriac Catholic priest Ishaq Armalto recorded that it was attacked by 10,000, including 20 tribal chiefs and Bedouins. The Ottoman soldiers joined the attackers in the battle against the villagers whereas the Omeran Kurds led by Khalil Ghazale upheld their promise to defend Banābīl and fought alongside the villagers. Khalil Ghazale initially refused to support the Ottoman soldiers in their attack on the village.

However, Banābīl lost the support of Khalil Ghazale after he received a written order from Qaddur Jalabi, mayor of Mardin, which threatened that anyone who protected Christians would be executed and their property would be confiscated. Khalil Ghazale consequently took part in the attack and plunder of the village. Many of the villagers were killed as they then fled to the Mor Hananyo Monastery, but were refused entry by the Ottoman guards posted there. Three men who climbed into the monastery were seized by the Ottoman guards and imprisoned at Mardin before they were sent to Diyarbakır for execution. The other men from Banābīl who had fled to the monastery, numbering approximately 70 in total, hid in caves for a few days before returning to the village and hiding in a building. They were forced to flee to the Mor Hananyo Monastery again after they were discovered and attacked by Kurds, but they were able to take refuge at the monastery after bribing the guards with 35 liras. The men remained at the monastery for three months, paying more bribes each month, until they were arrested by a new chief of guards and sent to Mardin to perform slave labour during the harvest time, after which most of them were killed.

The village had a priest in 1979. The mukhtar of Banābīl was murdered in the early 1990s. By 2013, there were 12–13 families and did not have a priest.

== Demography ==
The following is a list of the number of Syriac Orthodox families that have inhabited Banābīl per year stated. Unless otherwise stated, all figures are from the list provided in The Syrian Orthodox Christians in the Late Ottoman Period and Beyond: Crisis then Revival, as noted in the bibliography below.

- 1915: 150
- 1978: 36
- 1979: 35
- 1995: 18

== Bibliography ==
- Abed Mshiho Neman of Qarabash (2021) [1918]. Sayfo – An Account of the Assyrian Genocide. Translated by Michael Abdalla; Łukasz Kiczko. Edinburgh University Press.
- Barsoum, Aphrem (2008). History of the Za'faran Monastery. Translated by Matti Moosa. Gorgias Press.
- Bcheiry, Iskandar (2009). The Syriac Orthodox Patriarchal Register of Dues of 1870: An Unpublished Historical Document from the Late Ottoman Period. Gorgias Press.
- Bcheiry, Iskandar (2010). A List of Syriac Orthodox Ecclesiastic Ordinations from the Sixteenth and Seventeenth Century: The Syriac Manuscript of Hunt 444 (Syr 68 in Bodleian Library, Oxford). Gorgias Press.
- Bcheiry, Iskandar (2023). "A Syriac Orthodox List of Diyāqūs (Servants of the Church) from the Late Ottoman Period" (PDF). The International Journal of Levant Studies. 5: 25–74.
- Biner, Zerrin Özlem (2020). States of Dispossession: Violence and Precarious Coexistence in Southeast Turkey. University of Pennsylvania Press.
- Courtois, Sébastien de (2013). "Tur Abdin : Réflexions sur l'état présent descommunautés syriaques du Sud-Est de la Turquie, mémoire, exils, retours". Cahier du Gremmamo (in French). 21: 113–150.
- Dinno, Khalid S. (2017). The Syrian Orthodox Christians in the Late Ottoman Period and Beyond: Crisis then Revival. Gorgias Press.
- Gaunt, David (2006). Massacres, Resistance, Protectors: Muslim-Christian Relations in Eastern Anatolia during World War I. Gorgias Press.
- Jongerden, Joost; Verheij, Jelle, eds. (2012). Social Relations in Ottoman Diyarbekir, 1870-1915. Brill.
- Marciak, Michał (2017). Sophene, Gordyene, and Adiabene: Three Regna Minora of Northern Mesopotamia Between East and West. Brill.
- Silver, Kenneth; Silver, Minna; Pappalardo, Raffaella (2024). Satellite and Archaeological Reconnaissance in the Ṭūr ’Abdīn, Turkey: Final Report of the Finnish-Swedish Archaeological project in Mesopotamia (FSAPM), 2014-2016. Archaeopress.
- Sinclair, T.A. (1989). Eastern Turkey: An Architectural & Archaeological Survey. Vol. III. Pindar Press. ISBN 9780907132349.
