= Al-Qubaysiat =

Islamic women's organization and religious movement

Al-Qubaysiat, or Al-Qubaisiat (Arabic: القبيسيات) in Syria, Al-Tabba'iyyat (Arabic: الطباعيات) in Jordan, and Al-Sahariyyat (Arabic: السحريات) in Lebanon, is an Islamic women's organization and religious movement established in the early 1960s, based in Damascus, founded by Sheikha Munira al-Qubaysi in Syria.

The Qubaysi group is for women only and is an active part of Syria's Islamic revivalist movement. The group calls for an apolitical Islam. It aims at teaching young Syrian women and girls the Quran, hadith, Sunnah, tafsir and Islamic values and traditions. It organizes religious lessons in homes and has been instrumental in spreading religious sentiment among young women. Since its early days, the movement has operated semi-openly until it was officially recognized by the Syrian state under Bashar al-Asad’s government in 2003 and was allowed to openly operate its activities from official mosques.

== History ==
The activities of the Qubaysiat women started in the early 1960s. Munira al-Qubaysi, the group’s founder, was a certified school teacher in natural sciences. After graduation, she was appointed as a teacher in various schools in Damascus. Her position as a school teacher enabled her to combine her education work with Islamic preaching. These preaching activities were the reason for her imprisonment a couple of times during the early 1960s. After the Hama massacre of 1982, the group was forced to clandestinely carry out its preaching activities until 2003 when they were recognized by the state. The group has greatly benefited from the change in the Syrian government's policies towards Islamic revival in the Syrian society. First, Bashar al-Assad removed the law that forbids girls from wearing hijab at public schools, then he recognized al-Qubaysiat and called them to openly carry out their activities in public mosques.

== Ideology ==
There is controversy surrounding the ideology of the group. Some claim that the group is influenced by the Sufi ideology of the Kuftariya Naqshbandiya order. The basis for this assumption is the fact that Munira al-Qubaysi herself was a discipline of Sheykh Ahmad Kuftaro. Also, the nature of the group's work has a Sufi characteristic; it calls for elevating religious and moral consciousness of society by stimulating individuals’ ethical habits and behavior. The other assumption is that al-Qubaysiat’s ideology is influenced by Baathism due to some members of the movement being sisters and daughters of Baathists. This assumption is rather strong since the group assumed Baathi posts after the 2011 Revolution.

== Organization ==
Like all Sufi orders, the group has a hierarchical organization. Women are distributed among various ranks within the organization. A rank of a member of the group is known by the color of her Hijab. Members of the group are often identified by their distinctive style of dress: a hijab tied with a large knot under the chin, and buttoned overcoats coming down the mid-shin level. White hijab is worn by newly recruited members or members with a low degree of commitment to the group's activities. Light blue hijab is worn by members who have been upgraded and are in the middle ranks. Besides working on recruiting new girls to the group, members of this rank are entrusted with organizational and educational tasks. Organizational tasks range between organizing events and arranging meeting places. Educational tasks are mainly about reciting the Quran and teaching the Sunna to young members of the group. Dark blue hijab is worn by active and senior members; these members are entrusted with the task of teaching and preaching texts about more sophisticated topics like fiqh (Islamic jurisprudence), and Shariah (Islamic law).
