= Yeşilli =

- District and municipality
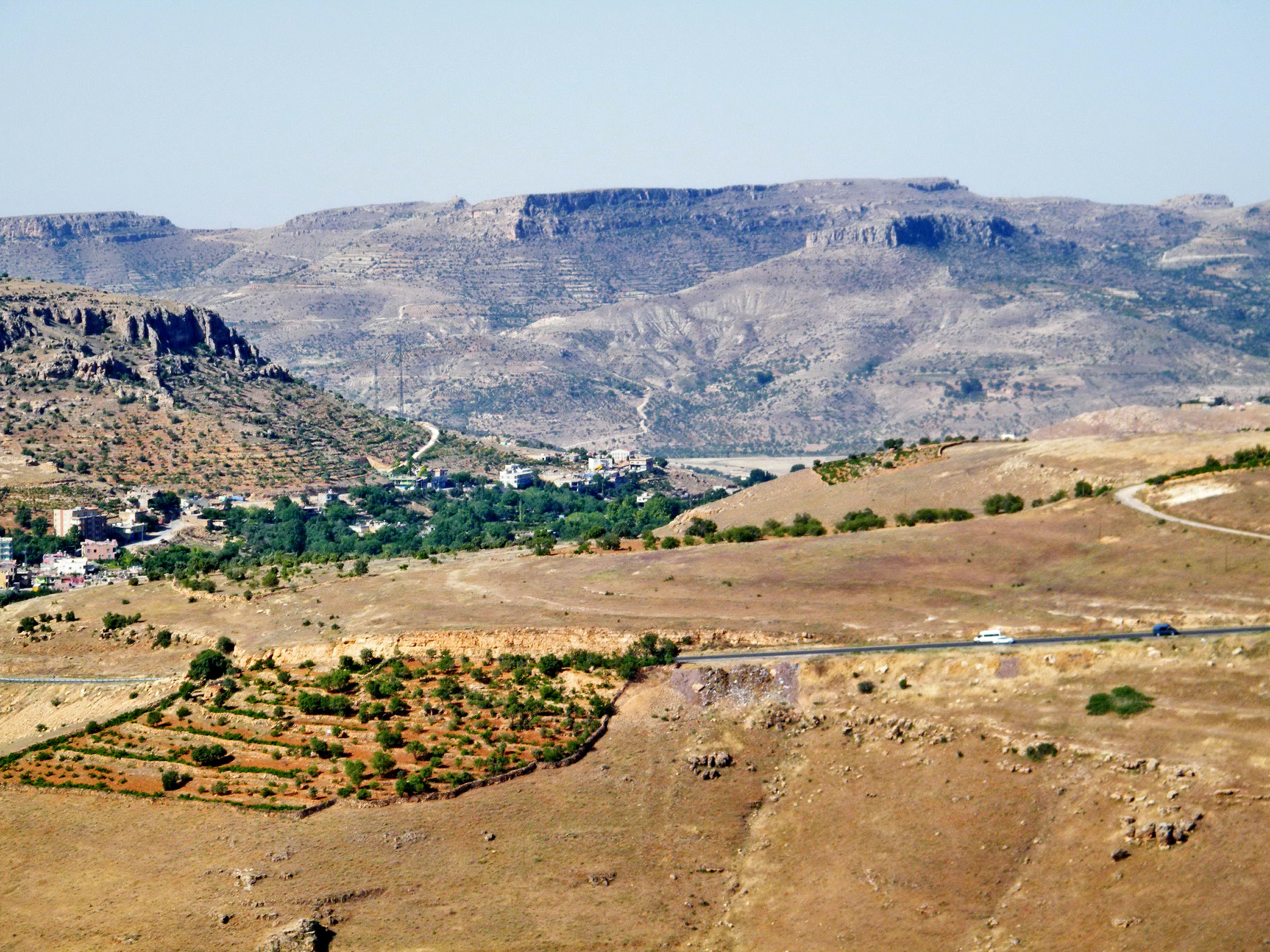
- Şirinevler neighbourhood

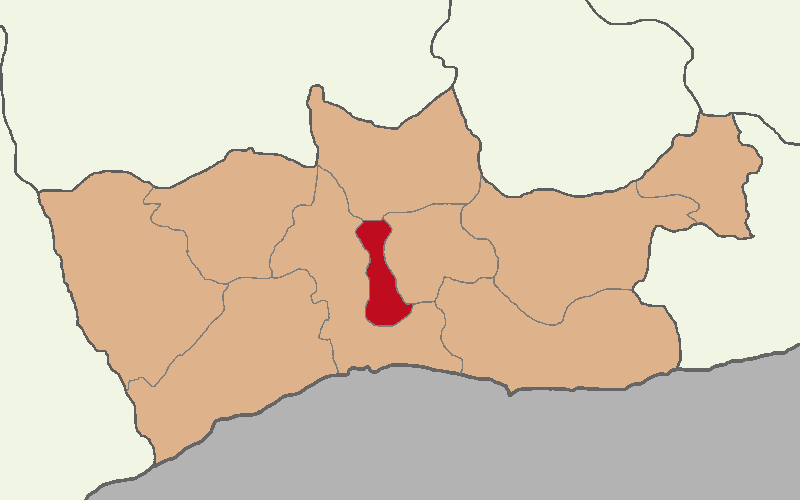
- Map showing Yeşilli District in Mardin Province

- Location within Turkey
- Coordinates: 37°20′26″N 40°49′33″E
- Country: Turkey
- Province: Mardin

Government
  - Mayor: Hayrettin Demir (AKP)
- Area: 168 km^{2} (65 sq mi)
- Population (2022): 13,621
  - Density: 81.1/km^{2} (210/sq mi)
- Time zone: UTC+3 (TRT)
- Area code: 0482
- Website: www.yesilli.bel.tr

Yeşilli (Classical Syriac: Rišmil, Arabic: رشمل, romanized: Rişmil, Kurdish: Rişmil) is a municipality and district of Mardin Province, Turkey. Its area is 168 km^{2}, and its population is 13,621 (2022). It is the smallest district in the province by population and by area. The district was created in 1990 from parts of the former central district of Mardin Province and of Ömerli district.

== Demographics ==
The town is populated by Arabs and by Kurds of the Omerkan tribe.

== Composition ==
There are 14 neighbourhoods in Yeşilli District:

- Alıçlı (Elûca)
- Bahçebaşı
- Bülbül (Benabil)
- Dereyanı (Şûrî)
- Gül
- Karşıyaka
- Koyunlu (Dandanê)
- Kütüklü (Kurima)
- Ovaköy (Bikêrê)
- Sancar (Tixus)
- Şirinevler
- Tepebaşı
- Uzunköy (Qelenderan)
- Zeytinli (Zeytunat)
