= Wafa Kaftaru =

- Born: 1961 (age 64–65)
- Children: four
- Parent: Ahmad Kaftaru

Wafa Kaftaru is the daughter of the deceased Grand Mufti of Syria, Shaikh Ahmad Kaftaru (Kurdish: Ahmad Kuftaro ) and his first wife Hawa Milli. She was born in 1961 in Damascus and has eleven sisters and brothers: Umar, Fu'ad, Khadija, Wisal, Muhammad, Muhammad Amin, Mahmud, Zahir, Hasan, Ihsan and Salah. She received a classical education in Quran, Tafsir, and Islamic Jurisprudence. At the same time, she was introduced to the Kaftariya Sufi order, which was a subbranch of the Naqshbandi-Mujaddidi-Khalidi-tradition. She received an Ijazah for the spiritual guidance Irshad of Sufi adepts from her father and started teaching female disciples in the Abu al-Nur Islamic Center and other mosques in Damascus from an early age on. She studied Sharia at the Faculty of Sharia at the University of Damascus and in the Abu al-Nur Islamic Center.
