= Kayadere, Ömerli =

Village in Mardin Province, Turkey

Kayadere
- Neighbourhood
- Location within Turkey
- Coordinates: 37.455°N 40.897°E
- Country: Turkey
- Province: Mardin
- District: Ömerli
- Population (2021): 305
- Time zone: UTC+3 (TRT)

Kayadere (Kurdish: Befewe; Syriac: Bāfāwā) (Note: Alternatively transliterated as Bafava, Bafayya, Bafawa, Bafawah, Bafawe, Bafova, Bāfōwā, or Bafowa.) is a neighbourhood in the municipality and district of Ömerli, Mardin Province in Turkey. The village is populated by Kurds of the Surgucu tribe and had a population of 305 in 2021. It is located in the historic region of Tur Abdin.

== History ==
Bāfāwā (today called Kayadere) was historically inhabited by Syriac Orthodox Christians. It was part of the Syriac Orthodox diocese of the Monastery of Mar Abai until the death of its final metropolitan bishop Ishaq Saliba in 1730, at which time it was subsumed into the diocese of Mardin. In the Syriac Orthodox patriarchal register of dues of 1870, it was recorded that the village had 22 households, who paid 47 dues, and it did not have a priest. There was a church of Yūldaṯ Alohō. The village was besieged for five days by Kurds in November 1895 during the Hamidian massacres. There was a church of Mar Malke.

In 1914, Bāfāwā was inhabited by 500 Syriacs, according to the list presented to the Paris Peace Conference by the Assyro-Chaldean delegation. There were 300 Syriac Orthodox Christians with three priests, 50 Syriac Catholics with one priest and one church, and 150 Protestants. It was located in the kaza (district) of Savur. Amidst the Sayfo, on 4 or 10 June 1915, Turkish soldiers and Kurds led by Hussein Bakro plundered the village and slaughtered the villagers. The massacre at Bāfāwā was one of the first in the region. The Syriac Orthodox priest and village headman were burned alive whilst the village headman's son was beheaded. Only 8 Syriacs escaped the massacre, of whom two fled towards the village of Rasin, but were killed by Kurds, four fled to Benebil, and two reached the Mor Hananyo Monastery. The rest of the village's population was taken to Shauro. The village was subsequently seized by Kurds.

== Bibliography ==
- Abed Mshiho Neman of Qarabash (2021) [1918]. Sayfo – An Account of the Assyrian Genocide. Translated by Michael Abdalla; Łukasz Kiczko. Edinburgh University Press.
- Barsoum, Aphrem (2008). The History of Tur Abdin. Translated by Matti Moosa. Gorgias Press.
- Barsoum, Aphrem (2009). History of the Syriac Dioceses. Vol. 1. Translated by Matti Moosa. Gorgias Press.
- Bcheiry, Iskandar (2009). The Syriac Orthodox Patriarchal Register of Dues of 1870: An Unpublished Historical Document from the Late Ottoman Period. Gorgias Press.
- Bcheiry, Iskandar (2019). "Digitizing and Schematizing the Archival Material from the Late Ottoman Period Found in the Monastery of al-Zaʿfarān in Southeast Turkey" (PDF). Atla Summary of Proceedings. 72 (January): 50–61. doi:10.31046/proceedings.2018.113.
- Brock, Sebastian (2017). "A Historical Note of October 1915 Written in Dayro D-Zafaran (Deyrulzafaran)". In David Gaunt; Naures Atto; Soner O. Barthoma (eds.). Let Them Not Return: Sayfo – The Genocide against the Assyrian, Syriac and Chaldean Christians in the Ottoman Empire (PDF). pp. 148–156.
- Courtois, Sébastien de (2004). The Forgotten Genocide: Eastern Christians, The Last Arameans. Translated by Vincent Aurora. Gorgias Press.
- Gaunt, David (2006). Massacres, Resistance, Protectors: Muslim-Christian Relations in Eastern Anatolia during World War I. Gorgias Press.
- Jongerden, Joost; Verheij, Jelle, eds. (2012). Social Relations in Ottoman Diyarbekir, 1870-1915. Brill.
- Tan, Altan (2018). Turabidin'den Berriye'ye. Aşiretler - Dinler - Diller - Kültürler (in Turkish). Pak Ajans Yayincilik Turizm Ve Diş Ticaret Limited şirketi. ISBN 9789944360944.
- Wannes, Sűleyman (2006). Syrisk-ortodoxa kyrkan, en överblick över Institutioner, stiftelser och medlemmar, samt civila och profana organisationer i världen (PDF) (in Swedish).
- Wießner, Gernot (1982). Christliche Kultbauten im Ṭūr ʻAbdīn (in German). Vol. I. Harrassowitz Verlag.
