= Mehmet Sincar =

Turkish politician (1953–1993)

Mehmet Sincar (1953 in İkipınar, Mardin Province – 4 September 1993 in Batman) was a Kurdish politician from Turkey and a Democracy Party (DEP) member of the Grand National Assembly of Turkey. He was assassinated in September 1993 together with the local chairman of the DEP in Batman. The Turkish Revenge Brigade took responsibility.

== Career ==
Sincar was first elected to the Grand National Assembly of Turkey in 1991, for the Social Democratic Populist Party (SHP). He joined the Democracy Party (DEP) in 1993.

== Death ==
Sincar was murdered in September 4, 1993, while leading a group in an investigation into political murders in Batman. In the same attack, the provincial HEP chairman of Batman Metin Özdemir was also killed while HEP MP Nizamettin Toguç was wounded. During the journey from Diyarbakir to Batman Sincar was protected by the police, but not at the time of his murder. He was buried in the cemetery of Kiziltepe. He was the first acting Member of Parliament who was killed.

== Recognition ==
In Siirt and Kiziltepe a park was named after him.

== Personal life ==
He was married to Cihan Sincar, who after his death turned politician and was elected Mayor of Kiziltepe.

== Books ==
- Aydın Bolkan (2005), Faili Meçhul Bir Milletvekili Cinayetinin Öyküsü: Mehmet Sincar, Istanbul: Aram Yayınları. ISBN 978-958-24-2115-1
