= Salihköy, Ömerli =

Village in Mardin Province, Turkey

Salihköy
- Neighbourhood
- Location within Turkey
- Coordinates: 37.458°N 41.004°E
- Country: Turkey
- Province: Mardin
- District: Ömerli
- Population (2021): 425
- Time zone: UTC+3 (TRT)

Salihköy is a neighbourhood in the municipality and district of Ömerli, Mardin Province in Turkey. The village is populated by Arabs and had a population of 425 in 2021.
