= Ərməki =

- Municipality
- Location within Azerbaijan
- Coordinates: 41°16′33″N 48°29′54″E
- Country: Azerbaijan
- District: Quba

Population
  - Total: 1,582
- Time zone: UTC+4 (AZT)
  - Summer (DST): UTC+5 (AZT)

Ərməki (also, Ermeki and Ermaki) is a village and municipality in the Quba District of Azerbaijan. It has a population of 1,582. The municipality consists of the villages of Ərməki, Digah, and Alıc.
