= Taşgedik, Ömerli =

Village in Mardin Province, Turkey

Taşgedik
- Neighbourhood
- Location in Turkey
- Coordinates: 37.390°N 40.923°E
- Country: Turkey
- Province: Mardin
- District: Ömerli
- Population (2021): 70
- Time zone: UTC+3 (TRT)

Taşgedik (Kurdish: Kafsenor) is a neighbourhood in the municipality and district of Ömerli, Mardin Province in Turkey. The village is populated by Kurds of the Omerkan tribe and has a population of 70 in 2021.
