= Kayabalı, Ömerli =

Village in Mardin Province, Turkey

Kayabalı
- Neighbourhood
- Location in Turkey
- Coordinates: 37.365°N 41.141°E
- Country: Turkey
- Province: Mardin
- District: Ömerli
- Population (2021): 205
- Time zone: UTC+3 (TRT)

Kayabalı (Kurdish: Kermêtê) is a neighbourhood in the municipality and district of Ömerli, Mardin Province in Turkey. The village is populated by Kurds of the Omerkan tribe and had a population of 205 in 2021.

== Notable people ==
- Ahmed Kuftaro
