= Kovanlı, Ömerli =

Village in Mardin Province, Turkey

Kovanlı
- Neighbourhood
- Location in Turkey
- Coordinates: 37.312°N 41.084°E
- Country: Turkey
- Province: Mardin
- District: Ömerli
- Population (2021): 79
- Time zone: UTC+3 (TRT)

Kovanlı (Kurdish: Mistînê) is a neighbourhood in the municipality and district of Ömerli, Mardin Province in Turkey. The village is populated by Kurds of the Omerkan tribe and had a population of 79 in 2021.
