= Kütüklü, Yeşilli =

Village in Mardin Province, Turkey

Kütüklü
- Neighbourhood
- Location in Turkey
- Coordinates: 37.253°N 40.880°E
- Country: Turkey
- Province: Mardin
- District: Yeşilli
- Population (2021): 263
- Time zone: UTC+3 (TRT)

Kütüklü (Kurdish: Kurima) is a neighbourhood in the municipality and district of Yeşilli, Mardin Province in Turkey. The village is populated by Kurds of the Omerkan tribe and had a population of 263 in 2021.
