= Alıç =

Alıç may refer to:

- Alıç, Gölpazarı, a village in the district of Gölpazarı, Bilecik Province, Turkey
- Alıç, Ilgaz
- Alıc, a village in Quba Rayon, Azerbaijan
