= Kocasırt, Ömerli =

Village in Mardin Province, Turkey

Kocasırt
- Neighbourhood
- Location in Turkey
- Coordinates: 37.360°N 40.877°E
- Country: Turkey
- Province: Mardin
- District: Ömerli
- Population (2021): 114
- Time zone: UTC+3 (TRT)

Kocasırt (Kurdish: Şêxkir) is a neighbourhood in the municipality and district of Ömerli, Mardin Province in Turkey. The village is populated by Kurds of the Omerkan tribe and had a population of 114 in 2021.
