= Anıttepe, Ömerli =

Village in Mardin Province, Turkey

Anıttepe
- Neighbourhood
- Location in Turkey
- Coordinates: 37.457°N 41.039°E
- Country: Turkey
- Province: Mardin
- District: Ömerli
- Population (2021): 320
- Time zone: UTC+3 (TRT)

Anıttepe is a neighbourhood in the municipality and district of Ömerli, Mardin Province in Turkey. The village is populated by the Mhallami and had a population of 320 in 2021.
