= Kaynakkaya, Ömerli =

Village in Mardin Province, Turkey

Kaynakkaya
- Neighbourhood
- Location in Turkey
- Coordinates: 37.340°N 40.932°E
- Country: Turkey
- Province: Mardin
- District: Ömerli
- Population (2021): 505
- Time zone: UTC+3 (TRT)

Kaynakkaya (Kurdish: Kudê) is a neighbourhood in the municipality and district of Ömerli, Mardin Province in Turkey. The village is populated by Kurds of the Omerkan tribe and had a population of 505 in 2021.
