= Zeytinli, Yeşilli =

Village in Mardin Province, Turkey

Zeytinli
- Neighbourhood
- Location in Turkey
- Coordinates: 37.230°N 40.842°E
- Country: Turkey
- Province: Mardin
- District: Yeşilli
- Population (2021): 709
- Time zone: UTC+3 (TRT)

Zeytinli (Kurdish: Zeytunat) is a neighbourhood in the municipality and district of Yeşilli, Mardin Province in Turkey. The village is populated by Kurds of the Qelenderan tribe and had a population of 709 in 2021.
