= Yuxarı Digah =

- Location within Azerbaijan
- Coordinates: 41°16′11″N 48°29′58″E
- Country: Azerbaijan
- Rayon: Quba
- Municipality: Ərməki
- Time zone: UTC+4 (AZT)
  - Summer (DST): UTC+5 (AZT)

Yuxarı Digah (also, Digyakh) is a village in the Quba Rayon of Azerbaijan. The village forms part of the municipality of Amsar.
