= Topağaç, Ömerli =

Village in Mardin Province, Turkey

Topağaç
- Neighbourhood
- Location in Turkey
- Coordinates: 37.4369°N 41.0385°E
- Country: Turkey
- Province: Mardin
- District: Ömerli
- Population (2021): 30
- Time zone: UTC+3 (TRT)

Topağaç (Kurdish: Xerab Reşk) is a neighbourhood in the municipality and district of Ömerli, Mardin Province in Turkey. The village is populated by Kurds of the Omerkan tribe and had a population of 30 in 2021.
