= Güzelağaç, Ömerli =

Village in Mardin Province, Turkey

Güzelağaç
- Neighbourhood
- Location in Turkey
- Coordinates: 37.404°N 40.983°E
- Country: Turkey
- Province: Mardin
- District: Ömerli
- Population (2021): 117
- Time zone: UTC+3 (TRT)

Güzelağaç (Kurdish: Merzikan) is a neighborhood located in the municipality and district of Ömerli, Mardin Province of Turkey. The village is predominantly inhabited by Kurds belonging to the Omerkan tribe, and as of 2021, it had a population of 117 people.
