= Taşlıca, Ömerli =

Village in Mardin Province, Turkey

Taşlıca
- Neighbourhood
- Location in Turkey
- Coordinates: 37.3361°N 40.9764°E
- Country: Turkey
- Province: Mardin
- District: Ömerli
- Population (2021): 106
- Time zone: UTC+3 (TRT)

Taşlıca (Kurdish: Xanê Sora) is a neighbourhood in the municipality and district of Ömerli, Mardin Province in Turkey. It is populated by Kurds of the Omerkan tribe and had a population of 106 in 2021.
