= Dereyanı, Yeşilli =

Village in Mardin Province, Turkey

Dereyanı
- Neighbourhood
- Location in Turkey
- Coordinates: 37.426°N 40.861°E
- Country: Turkey
- Province: Mardin
- District: Yeşilli
- Population (2021): 793
- Time zone: UTC+3 (TRT)

Dereyanı (Kurdish: Şûrî) is a neighbourhood in the municipality and district of Yeşilli, Mardin Province in Turkey. The village is populated by Kurds of the Surgucu tribe and had a population of 793 in 2021.
