= Işıkdere, Ömerli =

Village in Mardin Province, Turkey

Işıkdere
- Neighbourhood
- Location in Turkey
- Coordinates: 37.311°N 40.915°E
- Country: Turkey
- Province: Mardin
- District: Ömerli
- Population (2021): 52
- Time zone: UTC+3 (TRT)

Işıkdere (Kurdish: Mudê) is a neighbourhood in the municipality and district of Ömerli, Mardin Province in Turkey. The village is populated by Kurds of the Omerkan tribe and had a population of 52 in 2021.
