= Uzunköy, Yeşilli =

Village in Mardin Province, Turkey

Uzunköy
- Neighbourhood
- Location in Turkey
- Coordinates: 37.301°N 40.864°E
- Country: Turkey
- Province: Mardin
- District: Yeşilli
- Population (2021): 134
- Time zone: UTC+3 (TRT)

Uzunköy (Kurdish: Dirêjref) is a neighbourhood in the municipality and district of Yeşilli, Mardin Province in Turkey. It is populated by Kurds of the Omerkan tribe and had a population of 134 in 2021. It's located near the borders of Turkey-Syria.
