= Çimenlik, Ömerli =

Village in Mardin Province, Turkey

Çimenlik
- Neighbourhood
- Location in Turkey
- Coordinates: 37.391°N 41.021°E
- Country: Turkey
- Province: Mardin
- District: Ömerli
- Population (2021): 91
- Time zone: UTC+3 (TRT)

Çimenlik (Kurdish: Mercê) is a neighbourhood in the municipality and district of Ömerli, Mardin Province in Turkey. The village is populated by Kurds of the Omerkan tribe and had a population of 91 in 2021.
