= Osama al-Rifai =

Syrian Islamic scholar (born 1944)

Sheikh Osama al-Rifai
- أسامة الرفاعي
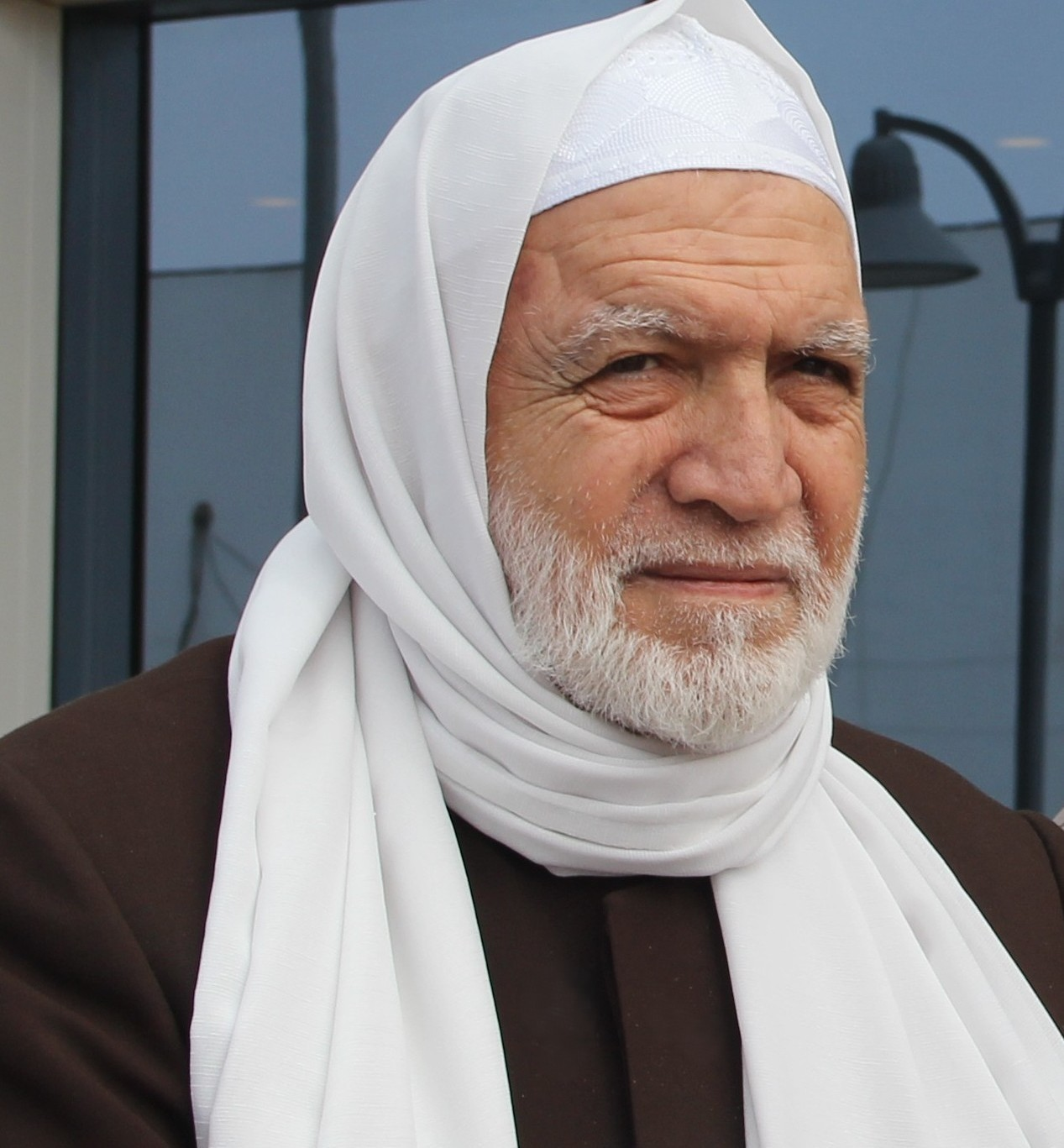
- Al-Rifai in 2015

Grand Mufti of Syria
- Incumbent
- Assumed office 28 March 2025; In opposition: 14 November 2021 – 28 March 2025
- Preceded by: Ahmad Badreddin Hassoun

Personal life
- Born: 1944 (age 81–82) Damascus, Syria
- Education: University of Damascus
- Relatives: Al-Rifai family

Religious life
- Religion: Islam
- Denomination: Sunni
- School: Shafi'i
- Creed: Ash'ari
- Profession: Islamic scholar, preacher

Sheikh Osama al-Rifai (Note: /oʊˈsɑːmə æl rɪfaɪ/ oh-SAM AL-ree-FYE al-REE-fai; Arabic: أسامة الرفاعي, romanized: Usāmah al-Rifāʻī,) (born 1944) is a Syrian Sunni Muslim scholar who has been the grand mufti of Syria since March 2025, the highest religious authority in the country. He belongs to the Ash'ari school of theology, and is affiliated with the "Zayd Group", a Sufi movement founded by his father. He was an advocate for the Syrian revolution until the fall of the Assad regime in 2024.

== Early life and education ==
al-Rifai was born to Sheikh Abd al-Karim al-Rifai (Note: Arabic: عبد الكريم الرفاعي) in 1944 in Damascus, Syria. He studied Arabic language and sciences at the University of Damascus. He graduated in 1971 and subsequently became the imam of the Abd al-Karim al-Rifai Mosque in Damascus, a mosque named after his father.

== Career ==
al-Rifai has been active in Sunni Islamic scholarship since the 1970s. He is a member of the "Zayd Group", a Sufi movement led by his father that emerged in the 1940s. In the late 1970s and early 1980s, his influence in religious circles brought him under scrutiny from the Syrian government. In 1981, he left Syria for Saudi Arabia following his affiliation with the Muslim Brotherhood amid a government crackdown on Islamic groups. While in Saudi Arabia, he continued his religious and scholarly activities, with a focus on community outreach. Following mediation efforts, he returned to Syria in 1993.

Following the assassination of Lebanese prime minister Rafic Hariri in 2005, Syria underwent a brief period of political openness, partly due to international pressure. During this time, al-Rifai's group initiated the Maintain the Grace project, an attempt focused on aiding the poor in Damascus. The project gained popularity but encountered restrictions by 2008, when the Syrian government began limiting the activities of various religious and social organizations as it reasserted political control.

=== Syrian civil war ===
al-Rifai became an active supporter of the Syrian uprising in 2011, reportedly using the Abd al-Karim al-Rifai Mosque as a base for both religious and political activities, preaching messages of resistance against the government of Bashar al-Assad. On 27 August 2011, Syrian security forces and militia reportedly attacked the mosque during the tahajjud prayer of the Laylat al-Qadr, injuring al-Rifai and numerous worshippers. He was subsequently hospitalized, and footage of his recovery surrounded by supporters was widely circulated.

After leaving Syria, al-Rifai relocated to Turkey in June 2012, where he formed a coalition of Syrian Islamist scholars and others to restore the League of Scholars of the Levant, a group established in 1937 that operated clandestinely until 2011. While in Turkey, he operated primary and university level educational institutions. In 2014, he was appointed by Turkish president Recep Tayyip Erdoğan as head of the Syrian Islamic Council in Istanbul. This appointment was part of Turkey's attempt to create an umbrella organization aimed at consolidating religious leaders in support of the opposition against the Assad regime.

Al-Rifai, along with his associates in the Muslim Brotherhood and Sufi networks, were active in both Turkey and areas of northern Syria under the control of Turkish armed forces, reportedly promoting a religious narrative consistent with the political views of the Erdoğan administration. Following the start of the 2017 Idlib Governorate clashes, Al-Rifai took the side of the Syrian rebel factions led by Ahrar al-Sham and declared the Al-Nusra Front to be heretical Khawarij, calling on all of its members to defect from the organisation. He denounced "takfiri ideology" and accused both al-Qaeda and the Islamic State of adhering to it.

In November 2021, the Syrian opposition appointed him as the Grand Mufti of Syria. He became the first person to hold the title since the position was abolished in 2021 by the Assad government. After the fall of Assad regime in December 2024, he was appointed as the official Grand Mufti on 28 March 2025 by President Ahmed al-Sharaa.

== Controversies ==
=== Appointment ===
Some Salafist figures, including the cleric Tariq Abdelhaleem and the Telegram channel Aqwal al-Arab, criticised the Syrian authorities for appointing a "polytheist, Asharite, Mu'tazilite tomb-worshipper" to the position of grand mufti. Al-Rifai was also attacked by them for previously issuing a fatwa supporting the expulsion of foreign fighters from Syria.

=== Gender roles ===
Al-Rifai has been criticized for remarks regarding gender roles and foreign influence in Syria. During a sermon in Azaz, he alleged that United Nations workers and other organizations were promoting women's liberation ideas that he viewed as disruptive to Syrian family structures.

=== Shia Islam ===
Al-Rifai has been accused of holding sectarian positions against Shia Muslims, having declared Shiites to be apostates and a “danger to Islam” who bear a "great hatred to Sunni Muslims" in a 2020 sermon.

=== Meeting with Ismail Haniyeh ===
In July 2022, Al-Rifai attended a meeting honouring Hamas leader Ismail Haniyeh's granddaughter for becoming a Hafiza of the Qur'an. This caused controversy among the Syrian opposition groups, as Hamas had recently restored its relations with the Ba'athist-led regime at the time. The Syrian Islamic Council's spokesperson later claimed that they had discouraged Hamas from taking this course of action during the meeting.
