= Grand Mufti of Syria =

Position of religious authority in Syria

- مفتي سوريا الكبير
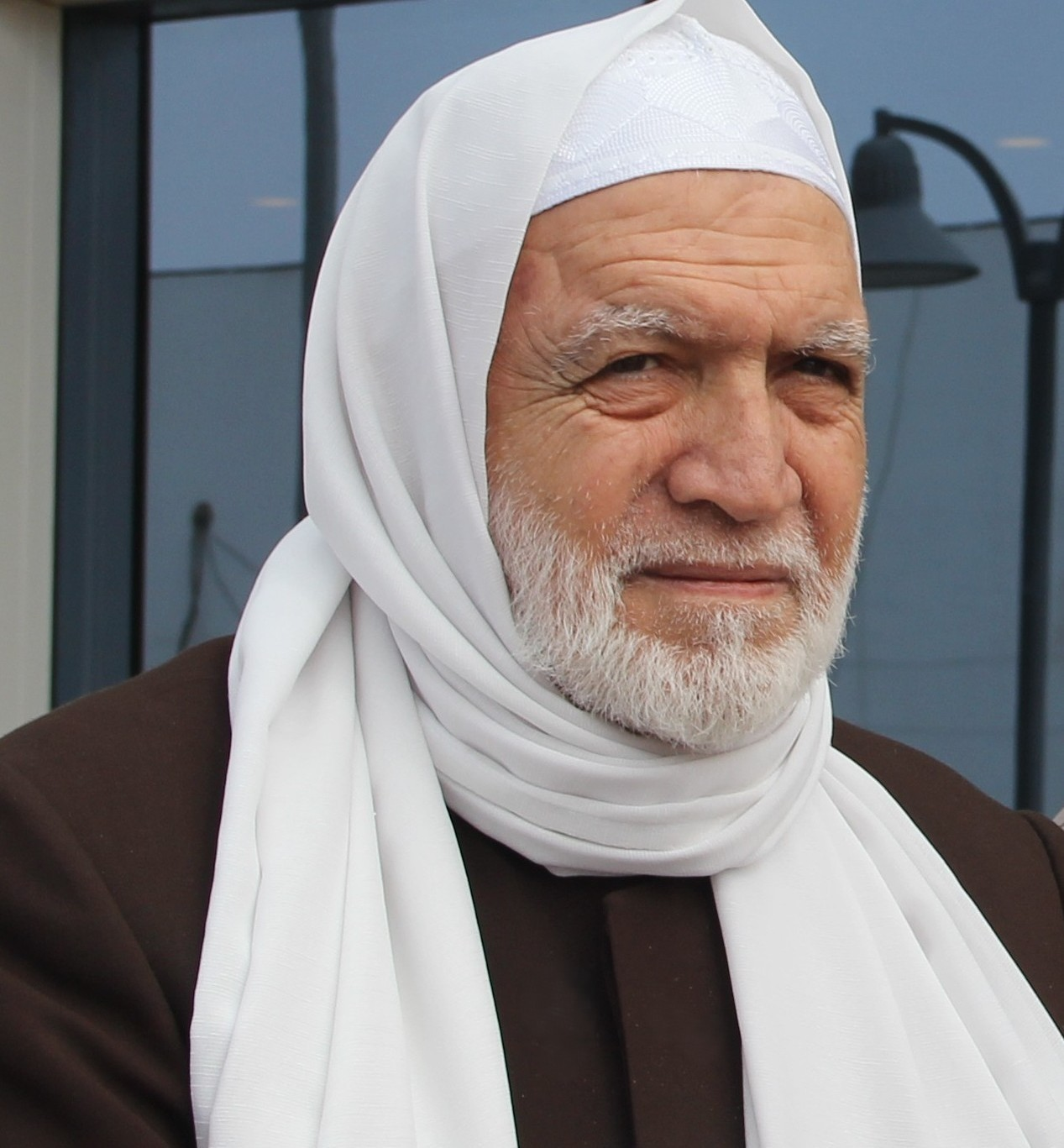
- Incumbent; Osama al-Rifai since 28 March 2025
- Type: Religious leadership / Advisory
- Status: Grand Mufti of Syria
- Appointer: President of Syria
- Term length: Life tenure (no fixed term)
- Formation: 3 August 1920; 106 years ago
- First holder: Muhammad Atallah al-Kasm

The Grand Mufti of Syria (Note: /ɡrænd ˈmʊfti əv ˈsɪriə/ GRAND-MOOF-tee-of-SEER-ee-ə; مفتي سوريا الكبير, Muftī Sūriyā al-Kabīr) is a legal religious representative in Syria, responsible for issuing formal legal opinions and advising on the Islamic legal code. It served as the official post until president Bashar al-Assad dissolved the office contentiously on 15 November 2021, transferring its duties to the state-aligned agency Supreme Council of Fatwa under the Ministry of Endowments. However, the Syrian opposition subsequently re-established the office in territories outside government control in an attempt to maintain its historical presence. The office is responsible for independent religious rulings and Sunni Muslim leadership amidst the ongoing civil conflict in the country.

== History ==
The position of the grand mufti, originally referred to as Shaykh al-Islām, was established by the Ottoman Empire. It served as a formal designation for high-ranking Islamic scholars. These scholars were entrusted with interpreting Islamic jurisprudence and offering guidance on religious matters. Although the historical records of muftis from different regions under Ottoman rule are limited, the office extended to various territories, including present-day Syria. Following the dissolution of the Ottoman Empire and the establishment of the French Mandate of Syria, the position of the grand mufti continued under local religious leadership.

After Syria gained independence in 1946, the office was retained under the constitution of Syria. However, it became more closely regulated by successive secular governments, including the Ba'athist regime that came to power following the 1963 coup. Under Ba'athist rule, religious institutions in Syria were more closely integrated with the state, and the role of the grand mufti was influenced by policies encouraging alignment between religious authority and government interests.

In the early 1970s, Assad abolished the election process for the position of grand mufti, re-appointing Ahmad Kuftaro as the grand mufti for life. Kuftaro held the position from 1964 until his death in 2004.

=== Dissolution ===
The decision to abolish the position of grand mufti occurred shortly after Sheikh Ahmad Hassoun, the then-current officeholder, made a statement during the funeral of renowned Aleppo singer Sabah Fakhri. Hassoun claimed that the map of Syria is referenced in surah At-Tin of the Qur'an and asserted that humanity was created in Syria. He interpreted the Qur'anic verse "{We have indeed created man in the best of moulds}" as referring specifically to "Syrian man," suggesting a spiritual status for Syrians. He also associated the surah with Syrian refugees, asserting that those who left the country would face divine punishment. This interpretation drew significant attention and was widely seen as controversial, generating both religious and public debate regarding his approach to scriptural exegesis and its implications amid Syria's ongoing conflict.

The changes regarding the grand mufti's position were part of a broader strategy for regime consolidation that began in 2018. The introduction of Law 31 altered the previously held life tenure of the mufti into a three-year term.

The decision to abolish the position of grand mufti in Syria is also attributed to multiple factors, including a long-standing rivalry between Sheikh Ahmad Hassoun, the former grand mufti, and minister of Religious Endowments, Mohammed Abdul Sattar.

Some observers link the decision to financial misconduct allegations involving Hassoun, dating back to his time as mufti of Aleppo. The abolishment attracted a significant shift for Syria, which, for the first time since its independence, lacks a designated role solely responsible for issuing fatwas. Several groups and critics, including Aix-Marseille University researcher Thomas Pierret view this as a demographic transitions in Syria, suggesting a diminishing of Sunni authority and its influence over religious rulings, personal status laws, and endowment regulations. Instead, the Scholarly Council of Jurisprudence, which along with other state-alleged agencies, now oversees these duties, includes a diverse membership from various religious communities, including Sunni, Shi'a, Druze, Alawite, Ismaili, and Christian representatives.

The Syrian Islamic Council (SIC) alleged the move as a step toward sectarianism, claiming it benefits the Iranian-backed concept of the Guardianship of the Islamic Jurist. The SIC also viewed its abolishment as facilitating the inclusion of foreign, pro-Iranian elements within Syria's religious institutions, a move it suggests further distances Syria from its historical Islamic and Arab identity.

== Appointment and responsibilities ==
Before the office was abolished in 2021 until it was reestablished in 2025 by the Syrian transitional government, the grand mufti of Syria was appointed by the president of Syria. Following its subsequent re-establishment by the Syrian opposition in its controlled areas, it served as the de facto religious authority of Syria.

Although the specific duties and influence of the office varied over time, the grand mufti's general responsibilities include, issuing fatwas and providing advisory support. As the highest Sunni authority in Syria, the grand mufti is also responsible for offering religious guidance to the Sunni Muslim community and participating in promoting Islamic education and observances, such as Ramadan and other religious holidays.

The role of the mufti is not exclusively designated for the Sunni sect; rather, it is entrusted to serve the entire Muslim community. One of the key responsibilities of the mufti is to oversee the affairs of all Islamic sects impartially, ensuring that no discrimination occurs. The appointment to this position involves an electoral process in which Muslim scholars participate.

== Criticism ==
While the grand mufti's primary role was religious, the office has occasionally been engaged in political advocacy. In the modern history of Syria, some grand muftis including Ahmad Badreddin Hassoun and Ahmed Kuftaro supported government policies, particularly during times of national crisis, while others such as Osama al-Rifai opposed them, which has sometimes led to both domestic and international controversy. Before the office was dissolved, it has been criticised from opposition groups who viewed the mufti's alignment with the government as compromising religious independence.

Bashar al-Assad's government leveraged the grand mufti's office to gain perceived Sunni religious support amid Syrian civil war and humanitarian crisis. Sheikh Ahmad Hassoun, during his time as grand mufti, publicly aligned with the Assad regime on various issues, which some critics interpreted as providing religious legitimacy to government actions. Hassoun reportedly approved the execution of approximately 13,000 political prisoners in Saydnaya Prison in 2017. While there is no direct evidence confirming Hassoun's role in these executions, his public support of the Assad regime on security and anti-opposition measures has led to perceptions of endorsement by association.

Prior to the opposition's establishment of the grand mufti office, the religious establishment in Syria was historically divided into two entities: the Ministry of Endowments and Religious Affairs (Awqaf) and the office of the grand mufti. Each of these bodies operated within different roles and contexts.

The Ministry of Endowments primarily focused on local matters, managing religious affairs and overseeing the welfare of citizens, including issues related to livelihoods and religious observances. In contrast, the grand mufti frequently served as a spokesperson for the government, conveying messages to both the domestic population and the international community.

== List ==
Throughout its history from the Arab Kingdom of Syria and the Syrian Arab Republic, the post was assumed by the four Sunni Muslim scholars, including a de facto appointment in 2021.

Syrian Grand Muftis

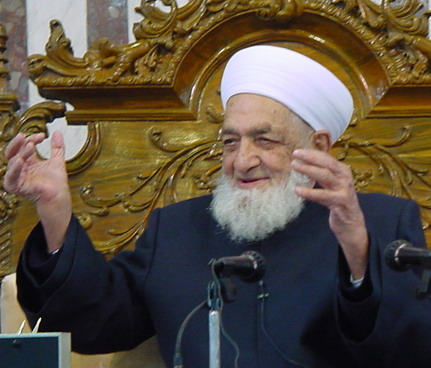
Ahmad Kuftaro

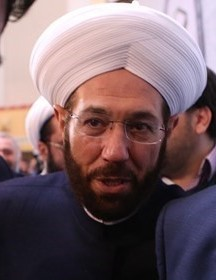
Ahmad Badreddin Hassoun

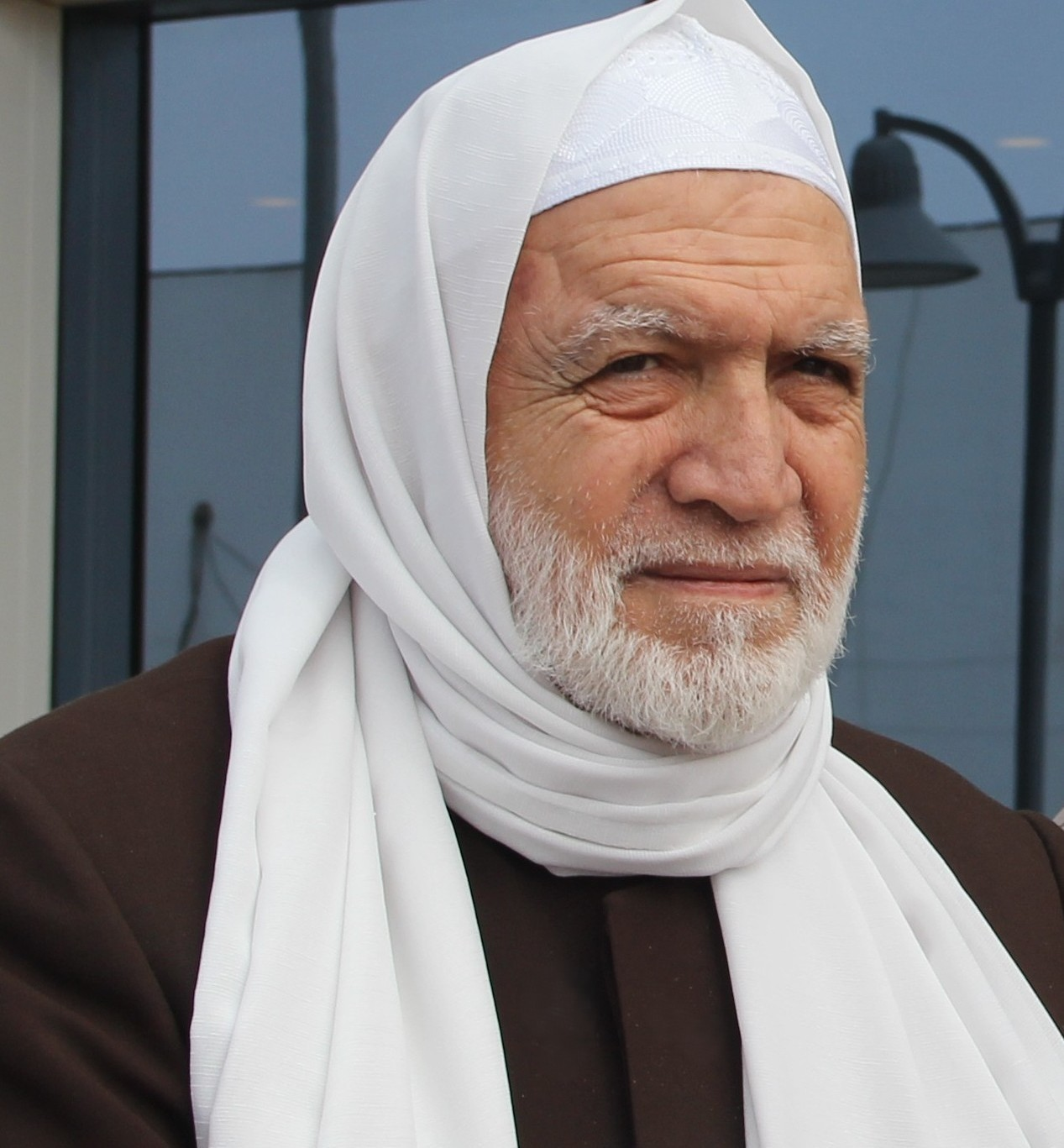
Osama al-Rifai

Following the Syria's self-proclaimed independence, Prince Faisal I of Iraq was proclaimed king the Arab Kingdom of Syria and appointed Muhammad Atallah al-Kasm as the country's first grand mufti. Al-Kasm served in this capacity from 8 March 1920, until his death on 4 August 1938.

The second grand mufti of Syria was Ahmad Kuftaro, who served from 1964 until his death in 2004. He was also the longest-serving grand mufti of the country. The third and the last officially appointed grand mufti was Ahmad Badreddin Hassoun, who held the position from 2005 to 2021.

Osama al-Rifai currently serves as the grand mufti appointed by the Syrian opposition in November 2021, following the formal abolition of the office by the Syrian government earlier that year. This makes him the first de facto grand mufti appointed outside government control. After the fall of Assad regime in December 2024, he was appointed as the official Grand Mufti on 28 March 2025 by President Ahmed al-Sharaa.

#	Portrait	Name (Birth–Death)	Home state	Term of office			President/monarchy
#	Portrait	Name (Birth–Death)	Home state	Assumed office	Left office	Time in office	President/monarchy
1	N/A	Muhammad Atallah al-Kasm (1844–1938)	Damascus	8 March 1920	4 August 1938	18 years, 147 days	Faisal I of Iraq (king of the Arab Kingdom of Syria)
2		Ahmad Kuftaro (1915–2004)	Damascus	1964	2004	c. 40 years	Amin al-Hafiz; Nureddin al-Atassi; Hafez al-Assad; Bashar al-Assad
3		Ahmad Badreddin Hassoun (born 1949)	Aleppo	16 July 2005	15 November 2021	16 years, 122 days	Bashar al-Assad
4		Osama al-Rifai (1944 – present)	Damascus	14 November 2021 (In opposition) 28 March 2025	Incumbent	4 years, 341 days	Syrian Interim Government; Ahmed al-Sharaa (from 2025)
