= Kayaüstü, Ömerli =

Village in Mardin Province, Turkey

Kayaüstü
- Neighbourhood
- Location in Turkey
- Coordinates: 37.454°N 40.922°E
- Country: Turkey
- Province: Mardin
- District: Ömerli
- Population (2021): 410
- Time zone: UTC+3 (TRT)

Kayaüstü or Eydo is a neighbourhood in the municipality and district of Ömerli, Mardin Province in Turkey. The village is populated by Arabs and had a population of 410 in 2021.
