= Mohammed Amin Kuftaro =

Sufi scholar

- Born: محمد أمين كفتارو
- Died: 1983
- Occupation: head of the Naqshbandi Sufi tariqa

Mohammed Amin Kuftaro (Arabic: محمد أمين كفتارو) (died 1938) was a Syrian-Kurdish Islamic scholar and head of the Naqshbandi Sufi tariqa.

Before his death in 1938, he designated his son, Ahmed Kuftaro, to take over his office as head of the order. Ahmed later went on to become the official Grand Mufti of Syria. His relative, Mohamed Saleh, was a Muslim scholar and Sufi Nakshbandi Imam in Damascus, Syria. It was he who led Mohammed Amin to the field of Islamic theology and Sufism.
