= Syrian Islamic Council =

Syrian Islamic opposition council based in Turkey (2014–2025)

- المجلس الإسلامي السوري
- Formation: 14 April 2014
- Founded at: Istanbul
- Dissolved: 28 June 2025
- Type: Religious organization
- Legal status: Non-governmental organization
- Purpose: Islam
- Headquarters: Istanbul, Turkey
- Region served: Syria
- Official language: Arabic
- President: Osama al-Rifai
- Affiliations: Syrian Revolution
- Website: https://sy-sic.com

The Syrian Islamic Council (Arabic: المجلس الإسلامي السوري) was a Syrian moderate religious authority composed of scholars of Islamic jurisprudence. It was established in 2014 in Istanbul, and was dissolved on 28 June 2025. The council aimed to unify religious efforts and provide spiritual guidance to the Syrian people, in addition to offering Islamic solutions to the country's issues and challenges.

Its mission was to consolidate the Islamic project and revitalize the role of religious institutions in Syrian society. The Council sought to shoulder the responsibilities and aspirations placed upon it, taking Syria as both the starting and ending point of its efforts. Through its religious authority, it aimed to unify the Islamic stance of scholars in Syria and across the broader Sunni Muslim world, mobilizing their capacities in a coordinated manner based on moderation and centrism. It also sought to communicate with various entities to articulate the legitimate demands of the Syrian people and garner support from global communities for the success and preservation of the Syrian revolution.

== History ==
=== Establishment ===
The Syrian Islamic Council was officially announced in Istanbul on 14 April 2014, during a consultative meeting attended by approximately forty Islamic associations, leagues, and independent figures. The founding charter emphasized that the council would be free of any military or jihadist representation, and would adopt a path of moderation and centrism. The founding meeting gathered over 128 Islamic scholars and preachers, and elected 21 members to the board of trustees. Sheikh Osama al-Rifai was chosen as president, with Moaz al-Khatib as his deputy, along with other prominent figures such as Hassan al-Daghim.

=== Objectives ===
The council outlined its primary goals as follows:

- Mobilizing support for the Syrian revolution, guiding its course, and preserving its achievements.
- Unifying religious edicts (fatwas) on public matters and applying Islamic law.
- Strengthening common ground among Syrians and mitigating internal disputes.
- Harmonizing views and positions on major national issues.
- Preserving the unity of the Syrian state and reinforcing its Islamic identity.

=== Principles ===
- Adhering to Islamic jurisprudence in all matters, upholding a balanced and moderate approach, and avoiding extremism or negligence.
- Commitment to shura (consultation) as the council's decision-making methodology, with its outcomes considered binding in accordance with the council's bylaws.
- The council recognizes Islamic law (Sharia) as its reference, grounded in its general objectives and principles, following the Sunni tradition (Ahl al-Sunnah wa al-Jama‘ah).
- Syria is part of the Islamic world; Islam is its religion and legislative foundation. There is no compromise on the unity of the Syrian people and territory, while acknowledging the rights of religious minorities as recognized by Islamic law.
- Promoting cooperation where consensus exists, and tolerance in permissible differences, with a commitment to centrism and moderation.
- Guaranteeing full citizenship rights for all Syrians—regardless of religion, ethnicity, or sect—without discrimination, while respecting the religious and cultural diversity of all societal groups in support of political pluralism.

=== Activities ===
The Syrian Islamic Council was active in several areas:

- Statements and Fatwas: Since its establishment, the council had regularly issued statements and religious rulings concerning Syrian affairs and broader Islamic issues, under the supervision of specialized committees comprising senior scholars. Over 170 statements and fatwas have been released, addressing sensitive and significant revolutionary, humanitarian, and legal matters.
- Coordination of efforts: The council had organized visits and meetings inside Syria to mediate disputes between armed factions and formed committees to coordinate among religious and judicial bodies. It also held events, workshops, and conferences to address revolutionary issues. The Council annually sent religious guides with the Syrian Hajj delegation to promote Islamic awareness.
- Organizing Islamic outreach in Turkey: Following the council's formation and the integration of most religious institutions operating in Turkey, it was recognized by the Turkish Presidency of Religious Affairs (Diyanet) as the religious reference for Syrian refugees in Turkey. The council established a coordination committee with Diyanet, which developed standards for mosque-based religious activities. The committee granted approximately 104 approvals for mosque outreach in Istanbul, nominated Hajj supervisors for four consecutive years, and selected Quran memorizers for Turkey's national Quran competition. In 1439 AH, the council's nominee Basil Attal from Aleppo won first place in the full memorization category. The committee also conducted visits to Diyanet headquarters in Ankara, local muftis in Istanbul, and religious authorities in southern Turkish provinces (Gaziantep, Reyhanlı, Kilis, and Urfa) to enhance cooperation.

=== Maqārabāt journal ===
The Council published Maqārabāt, a quarterly academic journal featuring scholarly articles on Islamic jurisprudence, thought, and civilization.

=== National Consensus Charter ===
On October 28, 2024, the Council presented a National Consensus Charter outlining principles for organizing Syria's future governance. It reflected the Syrian opposition's vision of a civil administration based on shura (consultation), justice, and Islamic values of moderation.

The charter's key principles included:

- Transitioning to a system based on justice, freedom, and dignity.
- Establishing independent judiciary bodies to prosecute perpetrators and uphold justice.
- Initiating inclusive political dialogue and social dialogue to build trust.
- Respecting Syria's religious and cultural diversity.
- Affirming Syria's Arab and Islamic identity.
- Preserving national unity and independent decision-making.
- Drafting a new constitution that reflects values of justice, liberty, and consultation.
- Adopting a democratic political system with free and fair elections and peaceful transfer of power.
- Promoting civil society participation and institutionalizing values of volunteerism and benevolence.

The document stresses that realizing these principles requires a patient and profound dialogue to unify efforts toward building a new Syria.

=== Dissolution ===
On 28 June 2025, the Council issued an official statement announcing its dissolution, alongside its affiliated and subsidiary institutions, such as the Syrian Fatwa Council and the Syrian Reciters Council, stating that it had done so after "achieving many of the goals for which it was established". The Council said that its decision was requested by Syria's transitional authorities, which intend on dissolving all revolutionary civil and political bodies in order to integrate them into state institutions.

The Council also recommended that all its members should "contribute positively and effectively to the success and enrichment of the new phase with their expertise and qualifications, and to unify efforts among those working in the fields of education, guidance, and advocacy", and thanked all its members and those who supported it.
