= Ovabaşı, Ömerli =

Village in Mardin Province, Turkey

Ovabaşı
- Neighbourhood
- Location in Turkey
- Coordinates: 37.357°N 40.995°E
- Country: Turkey
- Province: Mardin
- District: Ömerli
- Population (2021): 73
- Time zone: UTC+3 (TRT)

Ovabaşı (Kurdish: Metîna) is a neighbourhood in the municipality and district of Ömerli, Mardin Province in Turkey. The village is populated by Kurds of the Omerkan tribe and had a population of 73 in 2021.
