= Sancar, Yeşilli =

Village in Mardin Province, Turkey

Sancar
- Neighbourhood
- Location in Turkey
- Coordinates: 37.308°N 40.880°E
- Country: Turkey
- Province: Mardin
- District: Yeşilli
- Population (2021): 308
- Time zone: UTC+3 (TRT)

Sancar (Kurdish: Tixûb, Tuxus) is a neighbourhood in the municipality and district of Yeşilli, Mardin Province in Turkey. The village is populated by Kurds of the Omerkan tribe and had a population of 308 in 2021.
