= Abdul Rauf al-Kasm =

Prime minister of Syria (1980–1987)

- عبد الرؤوف الكسم
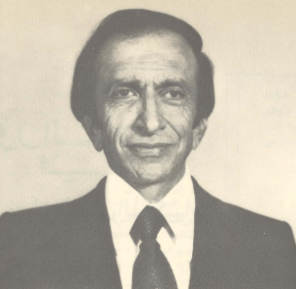
- Kasm in 1981

Prime Minister of Syria
- In office 9 January 1980 – 1 November 1987
- President: Hafez al-Assad
- Preceded by: Muhammad Ali al-Halabi
- Succeeded by: Mahmoud Zuabi

Governor of Damascus
- In office 1979–1980
- President: Hafez al-Assad
- Preceded by: Farouk al-Hamwi
- Succeeded by: Mohamed Sioufi

Personal details
- Born: 1932 Damascus, Syria
- Died: 19 October 2025 (aged 92–93) Munich, Bavaria, Germany
- Party: Ba'ath Party
- Other political affiliations: National Progressive Front
- Relations: Muhammad Atallah al-Kasm (father)

Abdul Rauf al-Kasm (Arabic: عبد الرؤوف الكسم, romanized: ʿAbd ar-Raʾūf al-Kasm; 1932 – 19 October 2025) was a Syrian architect, academic and politician who served as prime minister of Syria during the 1980s.

== Early life ==
Kasm was born in Damascus in 1932, into a Sunni family. Abdul Rauf was the third son of Muhammad Atallah al-Kasm, a Damascene scholar and mufti from 1918 until his death in 1938.

== Career ==
Kasm was professor of architecture at Damascus University. He was a member of the Baath Party. He served as Prime Minister of Syria from 9 January 1980 to 1 November 1987 under the presidency of Hafez al-Assad. Enjoying full support of president Assad, Kasm tried to end corruption by senior officers. However, his clash with then defense minister Mustafa Tlass led to his removal from office in 1987. After leaving office, he served as a senior consultant for national security.

== Death ==
Kasm died on 19 October 2025, at the age of 92 or 93.
