= Yaylatepe, Ömerli =

Village in Mardin Province, Turkey

Yaylatepe
- Neighbourhood
- Location within Turkey
- Coordinates: 37.433°N 41.010°E
- Country: Turkey
- Province: Mardin
- District: Ömerli
- Population (2021): 186
- Time zone: UTC+3 (TRT)

Yaylatepe (Arabic: Tavk) is a neighbourhood in the municipality and district of Ömerli, Mardin Province in Turkey. The village is populated by Arabs and had a population of 186 in 2021.
