= Ahmed Kuftaro =

Grand Mufti of Syria (1915–2004)

- أحمد كفتارو
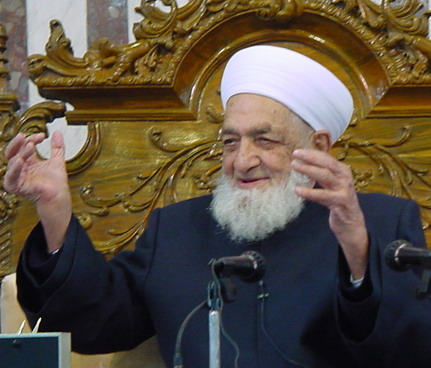

Grand Mufti of Syria
- In office 4 November 1964 – 1 September 2004
- Preceded by: Muhammad Abu al-Yusr
- Succeeded by: Ahmad Badreddin Hassoun

Personal life
- Born: 1912 or 1915 Damascus, Syria, Ottoman Empire
- Died: 1 September 2004 Damascus, Syria
- Spouse: Hawa Mili; Sabah al-Jabri
- Parent: Mohammed Amin Kuftaro
- Relations: Asma Mahmoud Kuftaro (granddaughter)

Religious life
- Religion: Islam
- Denomination: Sunni Islam
- School: Shafi'i
- Tariqa: Naqshbandi
- Creed: Ash'ari

Ahmed Muhammad Amin Kuftaro (Arabic: أحمد كفتارو; December 1915 – 1 September 2004) was the Grand Mufti of Syria, the highest officially appointed Sunni Muslim representative of the Fatwa-Administration in the Syrian Ministry of Auqaf in Syria. Kaftaro was a Sunni Muslim of the Naqshbandi Sufi order.

== Biography ==
The family of Kuftaro is Kurdish who have their origins in the village of Karma in Ömerli District of Mardin Province, Turkey. In 1878, the Kuftaro family moved to Damascus and settled near the Abu al-Nur mosque in the Kurdish quarter. Kuftaro's father, Amin Kuftaro, received a traditional education and started working at the Sa'id Pasha mosque. His first wife was Najiya Sinjabi and he had four sons and two daughters with her: Musa, Taufiq, Ahmad, Ibrahim, Zaynab and Fatima. With his second wife, Is'af Badir, he had three children, Rabi', 'Abd al-Qadir and Rabi'a.

== Classic education in Damascus ==
Kuftaro's father insisted that he first receive a classical education in Quran, Tafsir, Hadith and Islamic jurisprudence, namely Shafi'i Madhhab with Muslim scholars in Damascus.

== Career in the Ifta' Administration ==
In 1948, Kuftaro worked as a mosque teacher in Quneitra before moving to Damascus in 1950. Two years later, he became Mufti of the Shafi'i Madhhab in Damascus and a member of the Higher Ifta Council under Colonel Adib al-Shishakli. Kuftaro's political instinct aligned him with the Syrian Ba'ath Party in 1955. He reportedly supported the Baath Party candidate in the 1955 election for an open seat in parliament.

== Advocacy of interreligious dialogue ==
Ahmad Kuftaro advocated interreligious dialogue. He visited many countries as a representative of Syrian state Islam, including a 1985 visit with the Pope in Rome. He signed the Amman Message, a statement calling for tolerance and unity in the Muslim world that was issued on 9 November 2004 (27 Ramadan 1425 AH) by King Abdullah II bin Al-Hussein of Jordan.

== See also ==
- Nuh al-Qudah
- List of Ash'aris and Maturidis
