= Alıc =

- Location within Azerbaijan
- Coordinates: 41°15′08″N 48°28′15″E
- Country: Azerbaijan
- District: Quba
- Municipality: Ərməki

Population (2009)
  - Total: 382
- Time zone: UTC+4 (AZT)
  - Summer (DST): UTC+5 (AZT)

Alıc (also, Alij, Alyj, and Alych) is a village in the Quba District of Azerbaijan. The village forms part of the municipality of Ərməki.
