= Ahmad Badreddin Hassoun =

Syrian criminal and former Islamic scholar (born 1949)

ʾAḥmad Badr ad-Dīn Ḥassūn
- أَحْمَد بَدْر ٱلدِّين حَسُّون
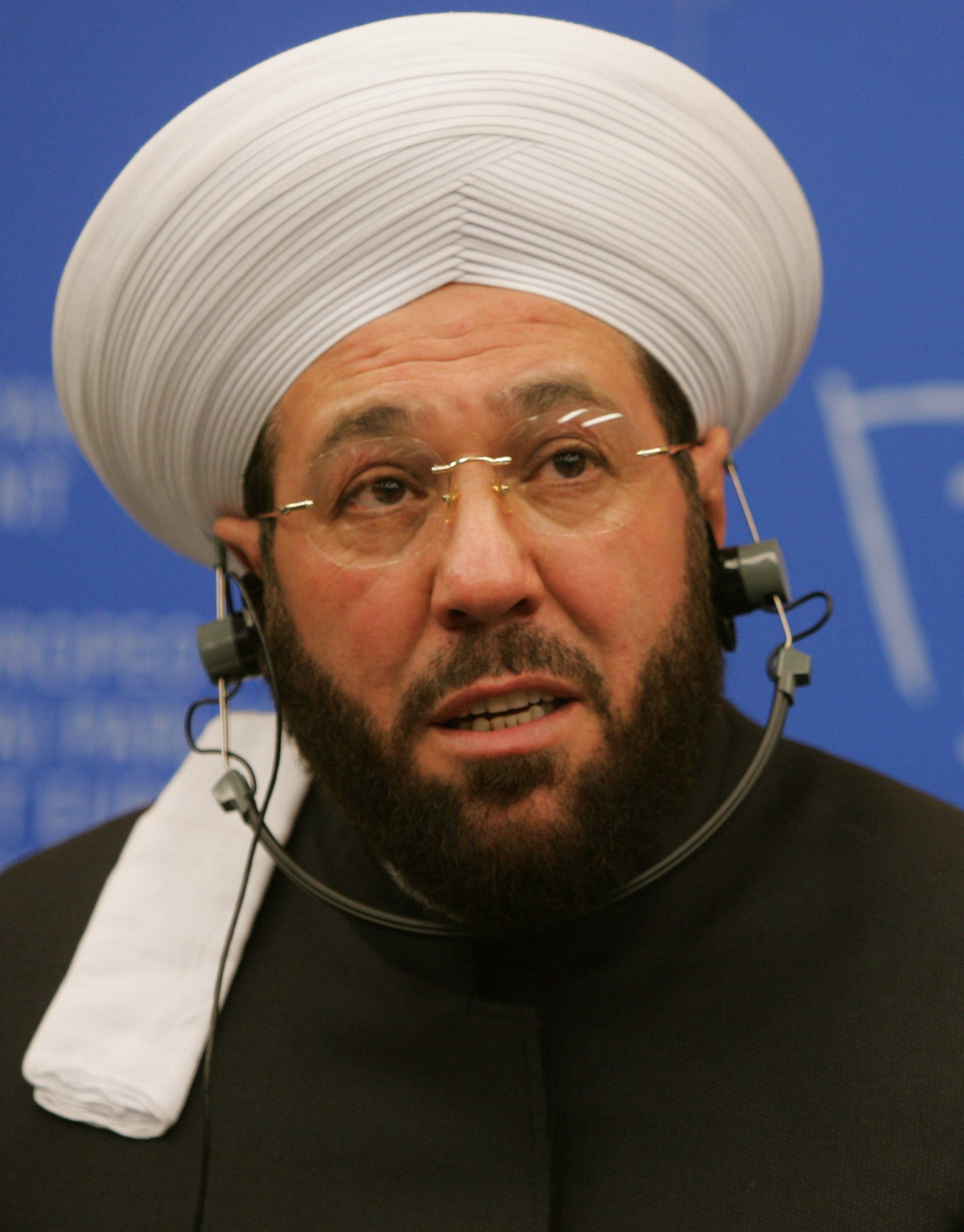
- Hassoun in 2008
- Born: 1949 (age 76–77); Aleppo, Syria
- Convictions: Inciting civil war and sectarian fighting; Incitement to intentional killing; Principal participation in intentional killing; Abuse of office
- Penalty: Life imprisonment

Details
- Country: Syria
- Date apprehended: 26 March 2025

Grand Mufti of Syria
- In office July 2005 – November 2021
- Preceded by: Ahmad Kuftaro
- Succeeded by: Usama al-Rifa'i (in 2025)

Religious life
- Religion: Islam
- Denomination: Sunni
- Institute: Al-Azhar University
- School: Shafi'i

Member of the People's Assembly
- In office 1990–1998

Ahmad Badreddin Hassoun (Note: Arabic: أَحْمَد بَدْرُ ٱلدِّين حَسُّون, romanized: ʾAḥmad Badr ad-Dīn Ḥassūn) (born 1949) is a Syrian convicted criminal and former Islamic scholar and politician. He served as the Grand Mufti of Syria from 2005 to 2021, after which the post was abolished by the Ba'athist-led regime. He also served as a member of the People's Assembly from 1990 to 1998, and additionally headed the Media Committee of the Supreme Advisory Council of the Islamic World Educational, Scientific and Cultural Organization.

Following the outbreak of the Syrian revolution in 2011 and the subsequent civil war, Hassoun became an outspoken supporter of Syrian president Bashar al-Assad, issuing several threats against the Syrian opposition and expressing strong support for the Ba'athist-led regime and its methods, eventually gaining the nickname of the 'mufti of the barrel bombs' in reference to the barrel bomb, a type of explosive device used extensively by Ba'athist-led government forces. Hassoun also openly supported the Iranian and Russian interventions in the civil war as well as praised Iranian military officer Qasem Soleimani, calling him a man who "only fights in a place where the enemies of God and humans are."

Following the fall of the Assad regime, Hassoun was arrested by the Syrian transitional government in March 2025. He was tried by the Fourth Criminal Court in Damascus in June 2026 and sentenced to life imprisonment for war crimes two months later.

== Early life ==
Ahmad Badr al-Din Hassun was born in Aleppo, Syria in 1949. His father, Muhammad Adib Hassun (1913–2008), was also a sheikh. He has five children and ten grandchildren. Hassoun studied at the University of Islamic Studies, where he graduated as Doctor in Shafi'i fiqh. He also earned a degree in Arabic literature.

He entered politics and served as a deputy of the People's Assembly from 1990 to 1998. Later, Hassoun took office as Grand Mufti of Syria in July 2005 after the death of Ahmed Kuftaro.

== Career ==
=== Interfaith dialogue ===
On 6 September 2006, Hassoun met the Armenian Foreign Minister, Vartan Oskanian, to discuss the relationship between the two nations, as well as the two religions, among other issues. In the same travel he met the Catholicos of All Armenians.

On 15 January 2008, Hassoun spoke to the European Parliament on the subject of intercultural dialogue, stressing the value of culture as a unifying rather than a dividing force. Hassoun was addressing a formal sitting of Parliament as the first speaker in a series of visits by eminent religious and cultural leaders in 2008, which had been designated the European Year of Intercultural Dialogue. He made the statement "Abraham, Moses, Jesus and Mohamed came with one single religion", therefore "there is no holy war, because a war can never be holy: it is peace that is holy"; later he added that it is wrong to use religion to justify killing.

He headed the Media Committee of the Supreme Advisory Council for the Rapprochement of Islamic Schools of Thought at the Islamic World Educational, Scientific and Cultural Organization (ISESCO), and also led the Sharia Advisory Board of the Monetary and Credit Council at the Central Bank of Syria.

=== Syrian civil war ===
Hassoun, as the Grand Mufti of Syria at the time, was one of the most prominent religious figures featured in the official Syrian discourse during the uprising that began in 2011; rumours had circulated that he had joined the Syrian revolution, which he publicly denied. He was known for his staunch support of President Bashar al‑Assad during the unrest and subsequent civil war.

During the initial protests in Daraa and elsewhere in early 2011, Hassoun appeared on state television several times, claiming that “external hands” were behind the unrest, without naming any specific country or group. He labelled the demonstrations as “acts of sabotage” carried out by “terrorists” and “armed cells” supported by foreign states.

Hassoun's remarks about Syrian refugees drew severe criticism; he accused those who fled the conflict of 'betraying the nation' and called for legal action against them, framing their departure as part of a foreign plot. Human rights observers denounced these statements as criminalizing victims and providing a religious justification for state persecution.

==== Der Spiegel interview ====
Hassoun was interviewed by the German magazine Der Spiegel on 8 November 2011, saying that some of the protestors in Syria were armed Islamist rebels backed by Saudi Arabia. He talked about religion and politics in Syria during the revolution:

But then imams who had come from abroad, especially Saudi Arabia, stirred things up with their inflammatory speeches. The news channels stationed in the Gulf states, Al-Jazeera and Al-Arabiya, helped them by falsely claiming that the clergy was on the side of the anti-Assad protesters.", "And what has really improved in Egypt? Should we welcome the rise of Islamist parties? I believe in the strict separation of church and state."

"How many, 50 or 55? We're talking about an army of tens of thousands of men. But some of the radical Sunni imams from Saudi Arabia and the Gulf region are stirring people up, and unfortunately they are finding a few Sunni imams in my country who sympathize with them. For instance, they have pronounced a fatwa against me, because in their view I am betraying religion and am too moderate. But I'm not the only one on their hit list." "They set their sights on my innocent son Saria, a 22-year-old student who was always friendly to everyone, who was studying International Relations and did not want to make religion his profession. So much for the kin liability you've criticized elsewhere! Oh, if only the four killers had killed me instead.", "There are close ties between the Saudi royal family and the American White House. The Americans are often on the side of the oppressors. I am always on the side of the oppressed." "I see myself as the grand mufti of all 23 million Syrians, not just Muslims, but also Christians and even atheists. I am a man of dialogue. Who knows, maybe an agnostic will convince me with better arguments one day, and I'll become a non-believer. And if I'm enthusiastic about the opposition's political platform, I also might change sides.

==== Threats to Europe and the United States ====
In a public address which aired on Syrian News Channel and was posted on the Internet on 9 October 2011 (as translated by Enab Baladi), Hassoun threatened Europe and the United States if Syria was attacked by external powers, stating that: "The moment the first missile hits Syria, all the sons and daughters of Lebanon and Syria will set out to become martyrdom-seekers in Europe and on Palestinian soil. I say to all of Europe and to the US: We will prepare martyrdom-seekers who are already among you. If you bomb Syria or Lebanon, it will be an eye for an eye and a tooth for a tooth."

Following the broadcasting of this speech, the Foundation for Middle East Peace withdrew an invitation to Hassoun to speak at the "Coexistence and Dialogue" conference. Foundation president Philip Wilcox stated that "We were not aware of his speech, which was at odds with the theme of the event."

==== Authority to approve execution orders ====
In 2016, it was reported by Amnesty International that Hassoun was one of three men who had been deputised by Syrian President Bashar al-Assad with the power to sign execution warrants for prisoners at Sednaya Prison. A 2017 follow‑up report estimated that approximately 13,000 detainees were executed at Saydnaya following the Mufti's approval.

==== Assassination of son ====
Hassoun's 22-year-old son, Sariya, was assassinated on 2 October 2011, in an ambush on the road between Idlib and Aleppo. The attack was attributed to armed opposition militants. A university professor, Mohammed al-Omar, who was accompanying him, was also killed in the attack.

=== Fall of the Assad regime ===
==== Arrest ====
He went into hiding after the fall of the Assad regime in December 2024. In February 2025, he was spotted in the Aleppo region.

On 26 March 2025, he was arrested at Damascus International Airport while attempting to leave the country for surgery in Oman via a stopover in Jordan. His passport was stamped before his arrest. He was then the subject of an arrest warrant issued by the Public Prosecutor's Office.

==== Trial ====
On 25 June 2026, Hassoun's trial began before the Fourth Criminal Court in Damascus. He faced charges including incitement and abuse of influence over allegations that he supported the former Assad regime, its officials, and allied militias. Prosecutors also accused him of inciting against civilians and using his position as Grand Mufti to provide religious and political legitimacy to the regime's actions.

On 6 August 2026, the court reached the final stage of the proceedings after hearing the prosecution's final submissions, the plaintiff's arguments, the defense, and Hassoun's final statement. The case was then referred for deliberation and judgment. The court set 24 August as the date for the verdict. Later that month, on 24 August, Hassoun was sentenced to life imprisonment for war crimes by Judge Fakhr al-Din al-Aryan. Judge al-Aryan lated stated Hassoun's religious establishment had "justified the use of barrel bombs that targeted civilian areas and caused widespread destruction, which constitutes a violation of the rules of international humanitarian law."

== See also ==
- 2016 international conference on Sunni Islam in Grozny
- Prosecution of Syrian civil war criminals
