= Munira al-Qubaysi =

Islamic scholar (1933–2022)

Shaykha Munira Qubaysi (also spelled Qubeysi; Arabic: منيرة القبيسي; 1933 – 25 December 2022) was an Islamic scholar.

== Education ==
Qubaysi completed a Bachelor’s degree in biology at the University of Damascus in the 1950s in an era when women in hijab studying at universities was either a rarity or entirely non-existent. She later earned another degree in Islamic studies (shariah) and learned both the outward and inward (Islamic spirituality) sciences of Islam from some of the most renowned scholars of Damascus. She was given the authorization (ijaza) to teach and be a spiritual guide. She established her own independent women's spiritual movement while simultaneously maintaining collaborative connections with the major religious leaders of Syria as a Muslim spiritual leader in her own right. After she died, much of the major male religious figures in Syria and beyond came forward to pay condolences and recognize her work.

She was born in 1938 to an Algerian father, Muhammad ʿAlī Ḥusaynī al-Jazāʾirī, who was a religious scholar and spiritual guide. She earned a PhD in mathematics from the Soviet Union. She came back and taught for a while in Algeria before marrying a Syrian man and settling in Damascus where she was appointed as a professor of mathematics at the University of Damascus.
