= Alıçlı, Ömerli =

Village in Mardin Province, Turkey

Alıçlı
- Neighbourhood
- Location in Turkey
- Coordinates: 37.464°N 41.060°E
- Country: Turkey
- Province: Mardin
- District: Ömerli
- Population (2021): 381
- Time zone: UTC+3 (TRT)

Alıçlı (Syriac: Ḫarbah Ğenğers) (Note: Also known as Kfarninağ.) is a neighbourhood in the municipality and district of Ömerli, Mardin Province in Turkey. It is populated by the Mhallami and had a population of 381 in 2021.

== History ==
Ḫarbah Ğenğers (today called Alıçlı) was historically inhabited by Syriac Orthodox Christians. The Eastern Roman Emperor Anastasius I Dicorus (r. 491–518) is said to have donated the village to the Mor Gabriel Monastery. In the Syriac Orthodox patriarchal register of dues of 1870, it was recorded that the village had five households, who did not pay any dues, and did not have a church or a priest.

== Bibliography ==
- Bcheiry, Iskandar (2009). The Syriac Orthodox Patriarchal Register of Dues of 1870: An Unpublished Historical Document from the Late Ottoman Period. Gorgias Press.
- Bilge, Yakup (2012). "The Saint Gabriel Monastery Trust". In Pieter Omtzigt; Markus K. Tozman; Andrea Tyndall (eds.). The Slow Disappearance of the Syriacs from Turkey and of the Grounds of the Mor Gabriel Monastery (PDF). LIT Verlag Münster. pp. 209–218.
- Tan, Altan (2018). Turabidin'den Berriye'ye. Aşiretler - Dinler - Diller - Kültürler (in Turkish). Pak Ajans Yayincilik Turizm Ve Diş Ticaret Limited şirketi. ISBN 9789944360944.
