= Alıçlı, Yeşilli =

Village in Mardin Province, Turkey

Alıçlı
- Neighbourhood
- Location in Turkey
- Coordinates: 37.257°N 40.916°E
- Country: Turkey
- Province: Mardin
- District: Yeşilli
- Population (2021): 251
- Time zone: UTC+3 (TRT)

Alıçlı (Kurdish: Elûca) is a neighbourhood in the municipality and district of Yeşilli, Mardin Province in Turkey. The village is populated by Kurds of the Omerkan tribe and had a population of 51 in 2021.
