= Muhammad Atallah al-Kasm =

20th century Islamic Scholar (born 1844)

Muhammad Atallah al-Kasm (Arabic: محمد عطا الله الكسم; 1844–August 7, 1938) was one of the most important Islamic scholars in Damascus in the 20th century. He was the first Grand Mufti of Syria after its independence in 1918 from the Ottoman Empire and held that position until his death in 1938.

== Life ==
Muhammad Atallah al-Kasm was born in Damascus in 1844 into a wealthy family of scholars, merchants, and scientists whose noble lineage traces back to Ali ibn Abu Talib. In his native Damascus, Atallah will study Islamic jurisprudence and be educated by some of the most important scholars of those years, such as Sheikh Muhammad al-Tantawi, Sheikh Abdullah al-Rikabi al-Sukkari and Sheikh Salim al-Attar. From a young age and for many years of his life, Atallah will work at the Maktab Anbar school and was a teacher at the Umayyad Mosque and at the Yalbugha Mosque.

By the time the Great War broke out, Atallah was one of the most respected scholars in the entire Levant. It was midway through the war that a dispute arose between him and the Ottoman military ruler Djemal Pasha, after the Damascene scholar openly condemned the decision to execute several notables and deputies in Marjeh Square on 6 May 1916. Those executed included deputies, intellectuals and lawyers such as Shafiq Mayad al-Azm, Rushdi al-Shama'a, Rafiq Rizq Sallum, Abd al-Wahhab al-Anglizi and other nationalist leaders of Syrian society at the time, who were sentenced to death for high treason and conspiracy. Atallah was one of many Arab scholars, religious figures, and intellectuals who would rise up against Ottoman rule, sympathize with Arab nationalism, and support the revolt of 1916–1918.

After the end of the war and the fall of Damascus in September 1918, Atallah al-Kasm swore allegiance to Prince Faisal ibn al-Hussein as the rightful Arab ruler of Syria, representing his father, Hussein ibn Ali, leader of the Great Revolt against the Ottoman Empire. He was appointed head of the Awqaf Committee and a member of the Damascus State Council, responsible for the sharia judiciary. On 11 May 1919, Faisal appointed him Grand Mufti of the city, replacing Sheikh Abu al-Khair Abdin, who had angered religious scholars by discussing the smoking issue.

=== Syrian Islamic Caliphate Society ===
Mufti Atallah Al-Kasm remained in office throughout Faisal's reign, calling for jihad against the French Army advancing on the city of Damascus from the Syrian coast in the summer of 1920. In March 1924, he was involved in establishing the Islamic Caliphate Society, an association with the goal of finding a valid caliph for the ummah after Turkish President Mustafa Kemal Atatürk abolished the position after centuries of being held by the Osmanoğlu family. The association included a number of personalities, such as Minister Badi Mayid al-Azm, Sheikh Ahmad al-Hasibi, and Emir Muhammad Said al-Jazari, a grandson of the Algerian mujahid Emir Abd al-Qadir al-Jazari.

=== Islamic Guidance Association ===
In the mid-1920s, Atallah al-Kasm joined the Islamic Guidance Association, which was founded by one of his students, Sheikh Mahmud Yassin, and participated in the publicity ceremony held at the Arab Academy headquarters. Mahmud Yassin assumed the presidency of the association and was interested in creating a network of Islamic schools to educate the illiterate and orphaned children of rebel fighters, and Atallah, as mufti, sponsored the project, but French intelligence closed it down due to its anti-colonial involvements.

Grand Mufti Atallah al-Kasm died on 7 August 1938 at the age of 94. After twenty years in office, he was succeeded by Muhammad Shukri al-Istany. Throughout his life, Atallah Al-Kasm wrote a series of books and research papers. His most important works were "Fasl's Discourse on Women and Hijab Obligation" and "Satisfying Sayings in Response to Wahhabism".

== Family ==
Atallah al-Kasm had numerous offspring. Three of his sons became important figures within Arab nationalism and later Baathism, including Dr. Badi' al-Kasm, a nationalist intellectual and theorist and one of the founders of the Baath Party, Abd al-Rauf al-Kasm, who became Prime Minister in the 1980s and Badr al-Kasm, who worked at the United Nations and wrote a series of legal, political and historical investigations.
