= Ömerli, Mardin =

Ömerli
- District and municipality
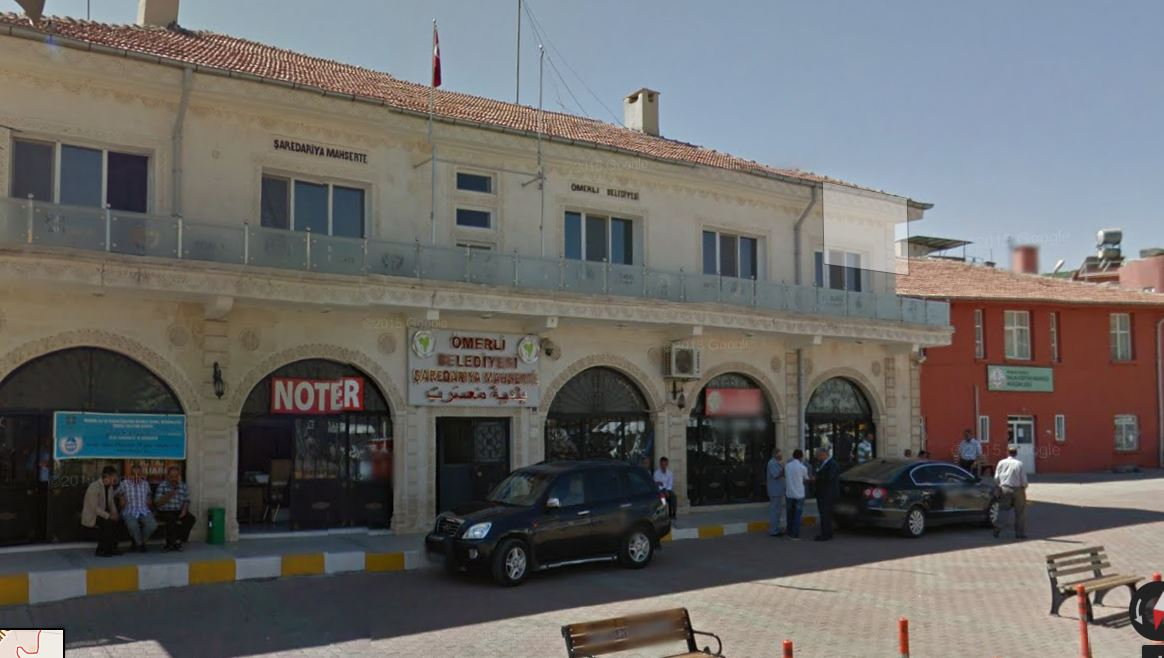

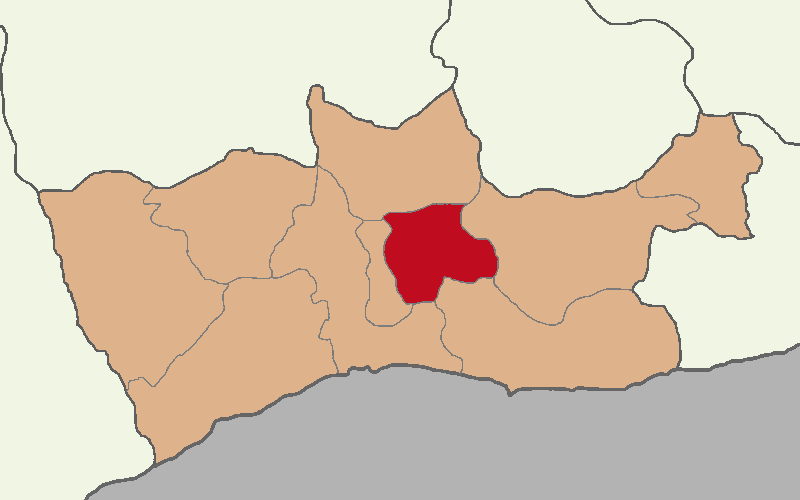
- Map showing Ömerli District in Mardin Province

- Location within Turkey
- Coordinates: 37°24′09″N 40°57′22″E
- Country: Turkey
- Province: Mardin

Government
  - Mayor: Hüsamettin Altındağ (AKP)
- Area: 458 km^{2} (177 sq mi)
- Population (2022): 13,740
  - Density: 30.0/km^{2} (77.7/sq mi)
- Time zone: UTC+3 (TRT)
- Area code: 0482
- Website: www.omerli.bel.tr

Ömerli (Arabic: معسرتي; Kurdish: Masertê; (Note: Also spelt as Mehsert.) Syriac: ܡܥܨܪܬܗ, romanized: Maʿsarteh) (Note: Alternatively transliterated as Ma’asirta, Ma‘sarta, Ma'sarte, Maʿsartī, Maʿserti, Ma‘sirtā, Maassarté, Masarte, Māṣertā, Maserta, Maserte, Maserteh, Māserti, or Maserti. Nisba: Ma‘sirtāwī.) is a municipality and district of Mardin Province, Turkey. Its area is 458 km^{2}, and its population is 13,740 (2022). The town is mostly populated by Kurds of the Bilikan tribe and Mhallamis. Other groups in the town include Kurds from other tribes, Arabs, few Syriacs and Georgians, and civil servants of Turkish roots. It is located in the historic region of Tur Abdin.

== Etymology ==
The Syriac name of the town is derived from "ma'ṣartā" ("wine-press" in Syriac).

== History ==
Maʿsarteh (today called Ömerli) is identified as the town of Madaranzu in Bit-Zamani, which was conquered by Ashurnasirpal II in 879 BC. It is later mentioned by Theophylact Simocatta and George of Cyprus as a kastron called Matzaron (Greek: Ματζάρων; Latin: Mazarorum). (Note: Also known as Assara, Manassaron, Masarta, or Massaron.) It was likely captured by a Sasanian army in 573 at the time of the siege of Dara, during the Roman–Sasanian War of 572–591, but was retaken and the fort was restored by the Roman commanders Theodore and Andrew in 587. According to the Notitia Dignitatum, it was commanded by the Dux Mesopotamia.

Maʿsarteh was part of the Syriac Orthodox diocese of the Monastery of Mar Abai until the death of its last bishop Ishaq (Isaac) Saliba in 1730, upon which the diocese was subsumed into the diocese of Mardin. In the Syriac Orthodox patriarchal register of dues of 1870, it was recorded that the village had 24 households, who paid 52 dues, and did not have a priest. There was a church of Yūldaṯ Alohō. German orientalist Eduard Sachau visited the village in 1880. It was visited by Oswald Parry in 1892. It was inhabited by 300 Syriacs in 1914, according to the list presented to the Paris Peace Conference by the Assyro-Chaldean delegation. They adhered to the Syriac Orthodox Church. There was a church of Mar Gewergis. The village was known for grape cultivation and wool weaving. The Syriac Orthodox Christians spoke Arabic.

Amidst the Sayfo, on 12 June 1915, the village's owner Huseyin Bakkero murdered 80 Syriacs at his house after assuring them of their safety and threw their bodies into wells. Two men survived by hiding in a cave whilst one man fled to the Mor Hananyo Monastery and the women and children were hidden by some Kurdish women for a few days and then escorted to the Church of the Martyrs at Mardin. Afterwards, some Syriacs from Maʿsarteh emigrated to Bethlehem. In 1960, Maʿsarteh was officially renamed Ömerli. By 1989, all Syriac families had fled the town. The Church of Mar Gewergis was converted into a mosque. 10 Syriacs in 3 families inhabited the town in 2013.

Mhallamis from villages between Ömerli and Midyat, such as Şenköy and Çavuşlu, moved to the town prior to Kurds from the Bilikan tribe, who supposedly settled there due to a blood feud. The Bilikan Kurds were subsequently Arabized and came to dominate local politics because of the size of their large families. They are plausibly the largest group in the town. According to the leaders of the Kurdish Omerkan (or Omeryan) tribe, which lives in the vicinity of the town, Ömerli had been under their rule for many years and considered the town to be in their territory. However, the town is not affiliated with any Kurdish tribe.

== Government ==
In 1925, the town became the seat of a bucak (subdistrict) of Savur, and was elevated to district in 1953. In January 2017, the town's mayor Süleyman Tekin was arrested. In the local elections of 2019, Hüsamettin Altındağ from the Justice and Development Party was elected mayor.

There are 46 neighbourhoods in Ömerli District. Three of these (Cumhuriyet, Şafak and Yenimahalle) form the central town (merkez) of Ömerli.

- Akyokuş (Xirba Kermêt)
- Alıçlı
- Anıttepe
- Beşikkaya (Fafê)
- Çalışan (Zehnî)
- Çatalyurt (Kurka Metîna)
- Çayıralanı (Rekkê)
- Çimenlik (Mercê)
- Çınaraltı (Rissîn)
- Cumhuriyet
- Dönerdere
- Duygulu (Yestê)
- Fıstıklı (Xirbê Şêx Mehmûd)
- Göllü (Golê)
- Güzelağaç (Merzikan)
- Harmankaya (Kewarex)
- Havuzbaşı (Taqê)
- İkipınar (Tere)
- İkitepe (Kersivan)
- Işıkdere (Mudê)
- Kayabalı (Kermêtê)
- Kayadere (Befewe)
- Kayagöze (Xirbê Mamîte)
- Kayaüstü
- Kaynakkaya (Kudê)
- Kocakuyu (Bêrtê)
- Kocasırt (Şêxkir)
- Kömürlü (Rişwanê)
- Kovanlı (Mistînê)
- Mutluca (Gewrik Sindî)
- Ovabaşı (Metîna)
- Öztaş (Xirbê Kevir)
- Pınarcık (Xerzikê Erebo)
- Şafak
- Salihköy
- Sivritepe (Xirbê Belik)
- Sulakdere (Hecîya)
- Taşgedik (Kafsenor)
- Taşlıca (Xanê Sora)
- Tavuklu (Xirbê Mirîşkê)
- Tekkuyu (Marmarê)
- Tokdere (Xaznê)
- Topağaç (Xerab Reşk)
- Ünsallı (Sada)
- Yaylatepe
- Yenimahalle

== Notable people ==
- Ḥanna Salmān (1914–1981), Syriac author.

== Biography ==
- Atto, Naures (2011). Hostages in the Homeland, Orphans in the Diaspora: Identity Discourses Among the Assyrian/Syriac Elites in the European Diaspora (PDF). Leiden University Press.
- Aydin, Julius Hanna (2018). Die Vita des Reklusen Mor Jakob von Salah (in German). LIT Verlag Münster.
- Barsoum, Aphrem (2003). The Scattered Pearls: A History of Syriac Literature and Sciences. Translated by Matti Moosa (2nd ed.). Gorgias Press.
- Barsoum, Aphrem (2008). The History of Tur Abdin. Translated by Matti Moosa. Gorgias Press.
- Barsoum, Aphrem (2009). History of the Syriac Dioceses. Vol. 1. Translated by Matti Moosa. Gorgias Press.
- Bcheiry, Iskandar (2009). The Syriac Orthodox Patriarchal Register of Dues of 1870: An Unpublished Historical Document from the Late Ottoman Period. Gorgias Press.
- Bcheiry, Iskandar (2010). Collection of Historical Documents in Relation with the Syriac Orthodox Community in the Late Period of the Ottoman Empire. Gorgias Press.
- Biner, Zerrin Özlem (2020). States of Dispossession: Violence and Precarious Coexistence in Southeast Turkey. University of Pennsylvania Press.
- Brock, Sebastian (2017). "A Historical Note of October 1915 Written in Dayro D-Zafaran (Deyrulzafaran)". In David Gaunt; Naures Atto; Soner O. Barthoma (eds.). Let Them Not Return: Sayfo – The Genocide against the Assyrian, Syriac and Chaldean Christians in the Ottoman Empire (PDF). pp. 148–157.
- Calder, Mark Daniel (2015). "We are the mother of the Arabs" : articulating Syriac Christian selfhood in Bethlehem.
- Courtois, Sébastien de (2013). "Tur Abdin : Réflexions sur l'état présent descommunautés syriaques du Sud-Est de la Turquie,mémoire, exils, retours". Cahier du Gremmamo (in French). 21: 113–150.
- Demircan, Adnan (2011). "Ömerli'de etnik yapı". Istanbul University Faculty of Theology (in Turkish).
- Dinno, Khalid S. (2017). The Syrian Orthodox Christians in the Late Ottoman Period and Beyond: Crisis then Revival. Gorgias Press.
- Gaunt, David (2006). Massacres, Resistance, Protectors: Muslim-Christian Relations in Eastern Anatolia during World War I. Gorgias Press.
- Ghadban, Ralph (2008). Die Libanon-Flüchtlinge in Berlin (PDF) (in German).
- Jongerden, Joost; Verheij, Jelle, eds. (2012). Social Relations in Ottoman Diyarbekir, 1870-1915. Brill.
- Kiraz, George A. (2011). "Salmān, Ḥanna". In Sebastian P. Brock; Aaron M. Butts; George A. Kiraz; Lucas Van Rompay (eds.). Gorgias Encyclopedic Dictionary of the Syriac Heritage. Gorgias Press. p. 358.
- Lipiński, Edward (2000). The Aramaeans: Their Ancient History, Culture, Religion. Peeters Publishers.
- Palmer, Andrew (1990). Monk and Mason on the Tigris Frontier: The Early History of Tur Abdin. Cambridge University Press.
- Parry, Oswald (1895). Six Months in a Syrian Monastery: Being the Record of a Visit to the Head Quarters of the Syrian Church in Mesopotamia with some Account of the Yazidis or Devil Worshippers of Mosul and El Julwah, their Sacred Book.
- Shahîd, Irfan (1995). Byzantium and the Arabs in the Sixth Century, vol. 1, part 1: Political and Military History. Dumbarton Oaks.
- Silver, Kenneth; Silver, Minna; Pappalardo, Raffaella (2024). Satellite and Archaeological Reconnaissance in the Ṭūr ’Abdīn, Turkey: Final Report of the Finnish-Swedish Archaeological project in Mesopotamia (FSAPM), 2014-2016. Archaeopress.
- Sinclair, T.A. (1989). Eastern Turkey: An Architectural & Archaeological Survey. Vol. III. Pindar Press.
- Tan, Altan (2018). Turabidin'den Berriye'ye. Aşiretler - Dinler - Diller - Kültürler (in Turkish). Pak Ajans Yayincilik Turizm Ve Diş Ticaret Limited şirketi. ISBN 9789944360944.
- Wannes, Sűleyman (2006). Syrisk-ortodoxa kyrkan, en överblick över Institutioner, stiftelser och medlemmar, samt civila och profana organisationer i världen (PDF) (in Swedish).
- Whitby, Michael; Whitby, Mary (1986). The History of Theophylact Simocatta. Clarendon Press.
- Wießner, Gernot (1993). Christliche Kultbauten im Ṭūr ʻAbdīn (in German). Vol. IV. Harrassowitz Verlag.
