= Başaran =

Başaran may refer to:

== Places ==
- Başaran, Beytüşşebap, a village in Şırnak Province, Turkey
- Başaran, Derik, a village in Mardin Province, Turkey
- Başaran, Çaycuma, a village in Zonguldak Province, Turkey
- Başaran, Eskil, a village in Aksaray Province, Turkey
- Başaran, Kuyucak, a town in Aydın Province, Turkey

== People ==
- Akif Başaran (born 1956), Turkish football player and manager
- Ayşe Acar Başaran (born 1985), Turkish lawyer and politician
- Cemal Basaran (born 1960), Turkish-born American engineering professor
- Ezgi Başaran (born 2003), Turkish recurve archer
- Gizem Başaran (born 1992), Turkish basketball player
- Hüseyin Başaran (1958–2015), Turkish sports commentator
- İrfan Başaran (born 1989), Turkish footballer
- Korhan Başaran, Turkish-born modern dancer and choreographer in New York City
- Mehmet Rüştü Başaran (born 1946/47), Turkish businessman
- Mina Başaran (1990–2018), Turkish businesswoman
- Tunç Başaran (1938–2019), Turkish film director
