= Kovankaya, Beytüşşebap =

Kovankaya
- Village
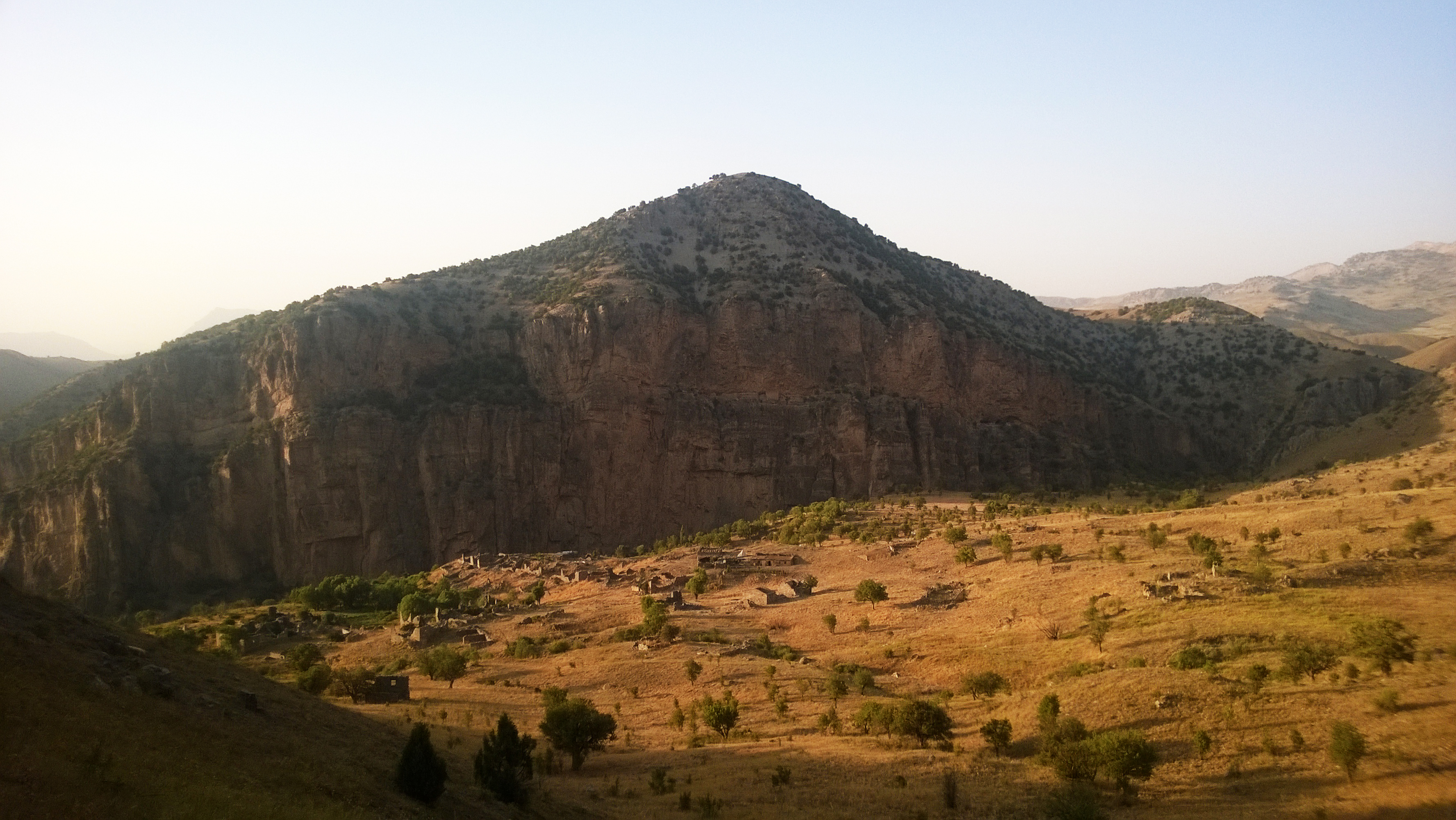

- Location within Turkey
- Coordinates: 37.608°N 42.861°E
- Country: Turkey
- Province: Şırnak
- District: Beytüşşebap
- Population (1997): 0
- Time zone: UTC+3 (TRT)

Kovankaya (Syriac: Meer) (Note: Alternatively transliterated as Mer.) is an unpopulated village in the Beytüşşebap District of Şırnak Province in Turkey. It is located by the river Hezil in the district of Beytüşşebap in Şırnak Province.

In the village, there were Chaldean Catholic churches of Mart Shmuni and Mart Maryam. A church of Mar Isha'ya was located nearby.

The hamlets of Ayrım (ܗܙ, Hoz), Üçkardeş and Yassıtaş are attached to Kovankaya.

== Etymology ==
The Turkish name of the village is derived from "kovan" ("beehive" in Turkish) and "kaya" ("cliff" in Turkish), and thus Kovankaya translates to "beehive cliff" in Turkish.

== History ==
The church of Mart Shmuni was originally constructed as a monastery in 320 AD, which housed 600 monks at its height. Meer was formerly exclusively inhabited by Assyrians known as Meeryayé. The villagers practised pastoral farming and beekeeping. In 1913, Meer and the neighbouring village of Hoz were inhabited by 500 Chaldean Catholics, and were served by one priest and one functioning church as part of the diocese of Gazarta. Meer was destroyed in 1915 during the Assyrian genocide in the First World War, and its population fled.

The village had a population of over 1000 people until mass emigration from Meer and other Assyrian villages in Turkey began in 1975 and persisted for the next two decades due to Turkish and Kurdish discrimination, and eventually over 700 people moved to Sarcelles, 500 to Clichy-sous-Bois, and 100 to Montluçon. An estimated 570 people populated Meer in 1980.

Meer was officially renamed to Kovankaya in 1986 as part of the Turkish government's policy of Turkification, but was destroyed, and its population of 16-20 families forcibly expelled in 1989 by Turkish forces. A number of villagers returned and partially rebuilt Meer in 1992, only for the village to be destroyed by Turkish forces again in June 1994, forcing the remaining seven families to flee to Gaznakh. Two families returned in 2010. On 11 January 2020, two villagers were abducted, allegedly by Kurdistan Workers' Party militants; the body of one was found on 20 March.

== Population ==
Population history of the village from 1965 to 1997:

Population
Year	Pop.	±%
1965	635	—
1980	1,076	+69.4%
1990	0	−100.0%
1997	0	0.00%

== Bibliography ==
- Akdikmen, Resuhi (2006). Langenscheidt Pocket Turkish Dictionary. Langenscheidt Publishing Group.
- Wilmshurst, David (2000). The Ecclesiastical Organisation of the Church of the East, 1318–1913. Peeters Publishers.
- Yacoub, Joseph (2016). Year of the Sword: The Assyrian Christian Genocide, A History. Translated by James Ferguson. Oxford University Press.
