= Mezraa =

Mezraa may refer to the following places in Turkey:

- Mezraa, Aşkale or Mezrea, a neighbourhood in Erzurum Province
- Mezraa, Beytüşşebap, a village in Şırnak Province
- Mezraa, Doğanyol, a neighbourhood in Malatya Province
- Mezraa, Hınıs, a neighbourhood in Erzurum Province
- Mezraa, Kemah, a village in Erzincan Province
- Mezraa, Pazarcık, a neighbourhood in Kahramanmaraş Province
- Mezraa, Pülümür, a village in Tunceli Province
- Mezraa, Vezirköprü, a neighbourhood in Samsun Province
- Mezraa railway station, near Mezra, Kars Province
