= Korhan =

Korhan is a masculine Turkish given name.

== Given name ==
- Korhan Abay (born 1954), Turkish actor
- Korhan Basaran, Turkish dancer
- Korhan Öztürk (born 1982), Turkish footballer
- Muharrem Korhan Yamaç (born 1972), Turkish disabled sport shooter
- Korhan Erel (born 1973), Turkish musician, artist, composer
