= Mela Huseynê Bateyî =

Kurdish poet and cleric (17th–18th centuries)

Mela Huseynê Bateyî (Kurdish: Melayê Bateyî; fl. 17th–18th centuries) was a Kurdish poet and cleric. He is regarded as the founder of the Kurdish mawlid literary tradition, as nearly all later Kurdish mawlids were influenced by his work.

== Biography ==
Little is known about the life of Bateyî; most information comes from Alexandre Jaba and Mahmud Bayazidi, whose accounts are considered unreliable. More recent studies suggest that he was born in the 17th century and lived until the mid-18th century, rather than in the 15th century as previously claimed by Bayazidi. He belonged to the Ertuşi tribe and was born in the village of Batê in the Elkî (modern Beytüşşebap region).

== Works ==
His main work is Mewlûda Kurdî (Kurdish mawlid) or Mewlûdu'n-Nebî ("Mawlid of the Prophet"), written in Kurmanji Kurdish. A mawlid is a literary work describing the birth and life of the Prophet Muhammad. The poem contains 19 chapters and was historically used as a textbook for teaching Kurdish. It was also widely popular among Muslim Kurds in northern Kurdistan, where it was often memorized and recited. It is still recited on various occasions, including religious ceremonies and charitable gatherings.

The work was first published in 1905 in Egypt, and later in 1919 in Istanbul. One of his poems on morality later entered the oral tradition of the Yazidis. He also composed several ghazals.

== Bateyî school ==
Because Bateyî became highly influential in later Kurdish mawlid poetry, scholars sometimes refer to a “Bateyî school” of composition. These poems typically begin with the basmala and hamdala, and include poetic praise of the birth of Muhammad.

They are intended for devotional recitation, often including salawat, and are traditionally performed in a melodic and rhythmic style as part of religious gatherings.

== See also ==
- List of Kurdish philosophers
- List of Kurdish scholars

== Bibliography ==
- Kreyenbroek, Philip G. (2005), "Kurdish Written Literature", Encyclopedia Iranica
- Leezenberg, Michiel (2014), "Elî Teremaxî and the Vernacularization of Medrese Learning in Kurdistan", Iranian Studies, 47 (5): 713–733, doi:10.1080/00210862.2014.934150, ISSN 0021-0862, S2CID 162201041
- Öztürk, Mustafa (2018), "Süleyman Çelebi ve Mela Huseynê Bateyî'nin Mevlidlerine Karşılaştırmalı Bir Bakış" (PDF), Turkish Studies, 13
