= Ayvalık (disambiguation) =

Ayvalık is an Aegean coastal town and district of Balıkesir Province, Turkey.

Ayvalık may also refer to:

== Places in Turkey ==
- Ayvalık, Yumurtalık, Adana Province
- Ayvalık, Beytüşşebap, Şırnak Province
- Ayvalık, İkizdere, Rize Province

== Other uses ==
- Ayvalık, an olive cultivar
- HMAS Gawler (J188), a ship, later TCG Ayvalık
- HMAS Geraldton (J178), a ship, later TCG Ayvalık

== See also ==
- Ayvalık Islands Nature Park
