= Mutluca =

Mutluca may refer to the following places in Turkey:

- Mutluca, Beytüşşebap, a village in Şırnak Province
- Mutluca, Hazro, a neighbourhood in Diyarbakır Province
- Mutluca, Hınıs, a neighbourhood in Erzurum Province
- Mutluca, Karpuzlu, a neighbourhood in Aydın Province
- Mutluca, Ömerli, a neighbourhood in Mardin Province
- Mutluca, Solhan, a village in Bingöl Province
