= TCG Ayvalık =

TCG Ayvalık is the name of the following ships of the Turkish Navy:

- TCG Ayvalık (1946), ex-HMAS Gawler (J188), a Bathurst-class corvette acquired in 1946 and decommissioned in 1963
- TCG Ayvalık (M 500), ex-HMAS Geraldton (J178), a Bathurst-class corvette acquired in 1946 and named Antalya, renamed Ayvalık in 1963, decommissioned in 1975
- TCG Ayvalık (M 267), an A-class minehunter commissioned in 2007

== See also ==
- Ayvalık (disambiguation)
