= Kırkmeşe, Pülümür =

Village in Tunceli Province, Turkey

Kırkmeşe
- Village
- Location within Turkey
- Coordinates: 39.5712°N 39.8335°E
- Country: Turkey
- Province: Tunceli
- District: Pülümür
- Population (2021): 30
- Time zone: UTC+3 (TRT)

Kırkmeşe (Kurdish: Gobirge) is a village in the Pülümür District, Tunceli Province, Turkey. The village is populated by Kurds of the Balaban tribe and had a population of 30 in 2021.

The hamlet of Dal is attached to the village.
