= Bardakçı, Pülümür =

Village in Tunceli Province, Turkey

Bardakçı
- Village
- Location within Turkey
- Coordinates: 39.5622°N 40.2152°E
- Country: Turkey
- Province: Tunceli
- District: Pülümür
- Population (2021): 44
- Time zone: UTC+3 (TRT)

Bardakçı (Kurdish: Bardaxçîye) is a village in the Pülümür District, Tunceli Province, Turkey. The village is populated by Kurds of the Balaban tribe and had a population of 44 in 2021.

The hamlets of Çepeli and Şahnazar are attached to the village.
