= Kayırlar, Pülümür =

Village in Tunceli Province, Turkey

Kayırlar
- Village
- Location within Turkey
- Coordinates: 39.4274°N 39.9671°E
- Country: Turkey
- Province: Tunceli
- District: Pülümür
- Population (2021): 20
- Time zone: UTC+3 (TRT)

Kayırlar (Kurdish: Qayire) is a village in the Pülümür District, Tunceli Province, Turkey. The village is populated by Kurds of the Şavalan tribe and had a population of 20 in 2021.

The hamlets of Aksu, Alagöz, Aşağıkayır, Bezeli, Çağlayan, Değirmendere, Deretarla, Gümüşdere, Katır, Kırmızıtarla, Komdere, Ortakayır, Pire, Sarıbudak, Sarımeşe, Söğütdere, Yarımca, Yoncalık and Yukarıkayır are attached to the village.
