= Sevim Aydin =

German politician (born 1972)

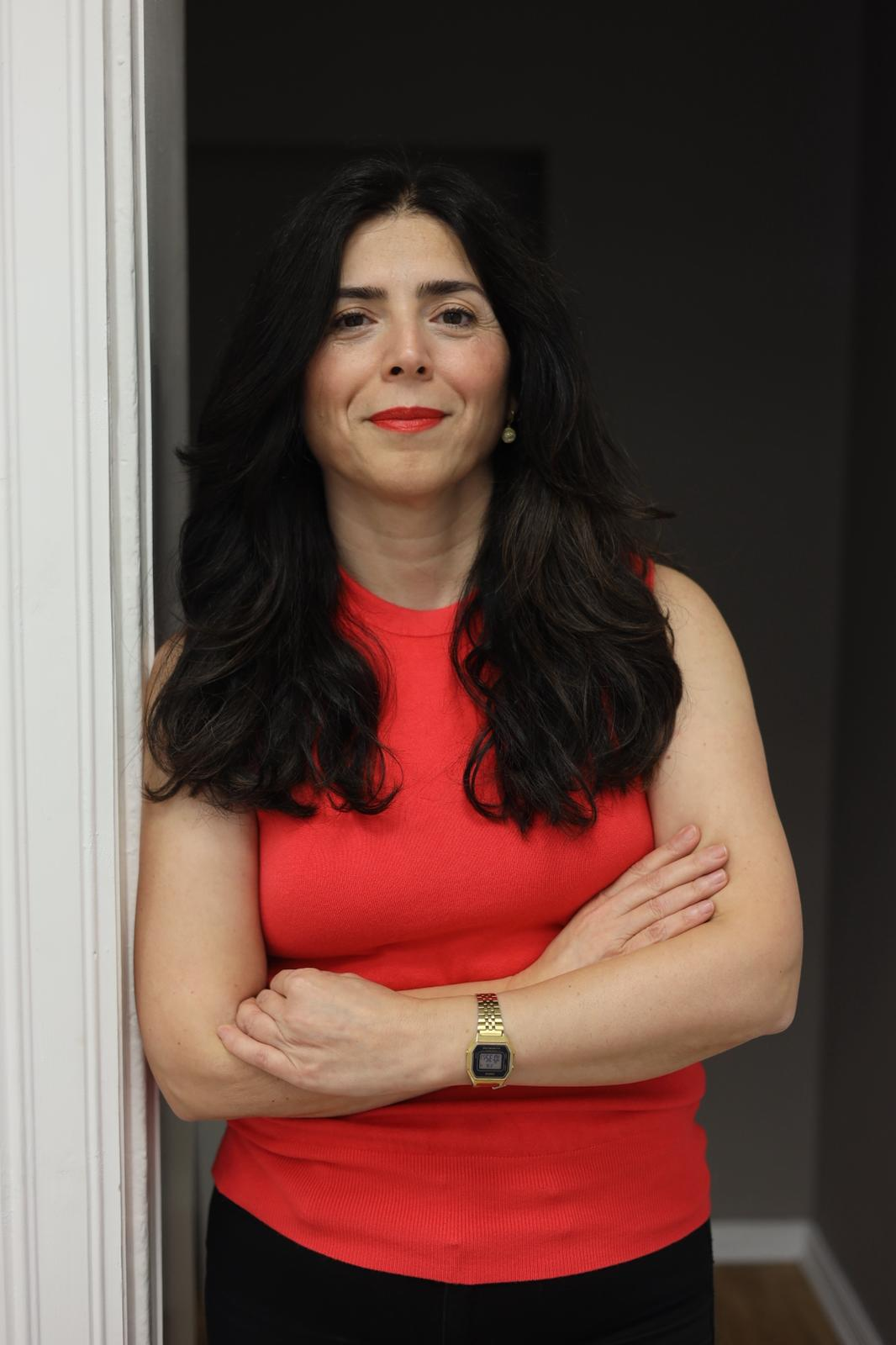
- Aydin in 2025

Member of the Abgeordnetenhaus of Berlin
- Incumbent
- Assumed office 4 November 2021
- Constituency: Friedrichshain-Kreuzberg

Personal details
- Born: 1972 (age 53–54) Pülümür
- Party: Social Democratic Party (since 2004)

Sevim Aydin (born 1972 in Pülümür) is a Turkish-born German politician serving as a member of the Abgeordnetenhaus of Berlin since 2021. She has served as chairwoman of the Social Democratic Party in Luisenstadt since 2012.
