= Bolağaç, Beytüşşebap =

Village in Şırnak Province, Turkey

Bolağaç
- Village
- Location within Turkey
- Coordinates: 37.504°N 43.052°E
- Country: Turkey
- Province: Şırnak
- District: Beytüşşebap
- Population (2023): 550
- Time zone: UTC+3 (TRT)

Bolağaç (Kurdish: Bîşî) is a village in the Beytüşşebap District of Şırnak Province in Turkey. The village is populated by Kurds of the Jirkî tribe and had a population of 550 in 2023.

The hamlet of Otlak is attached to Bolağaç.

== Population ==
Population history from 2007 to 2023:

Population
Year	Pop.	±%
2007	773	—
2010	756	−2.2%
2015	645	−14.7%
2020	632	−2.0%
2023	550	−13.0%
