= Demirtaş, Yumurtalık =

Demirtaş
- Neighbourhood
- Location in Turkey
- Coordinates: 36.8225°N 35.8157°E
- Country: Turkey
- Province: Adana
- District: Yumurtalık
- Population (2022): 595
- Time zone: UTC+3 (TRT)

Demirtaş is a neighbourhood in the municipality and district of Yumurtalık, Adana Province, Turkey. Its population is 595 (2022). This village is a 9-minute drive from the seaside town of Yumurtalık.
