= Süleyman's Tower =

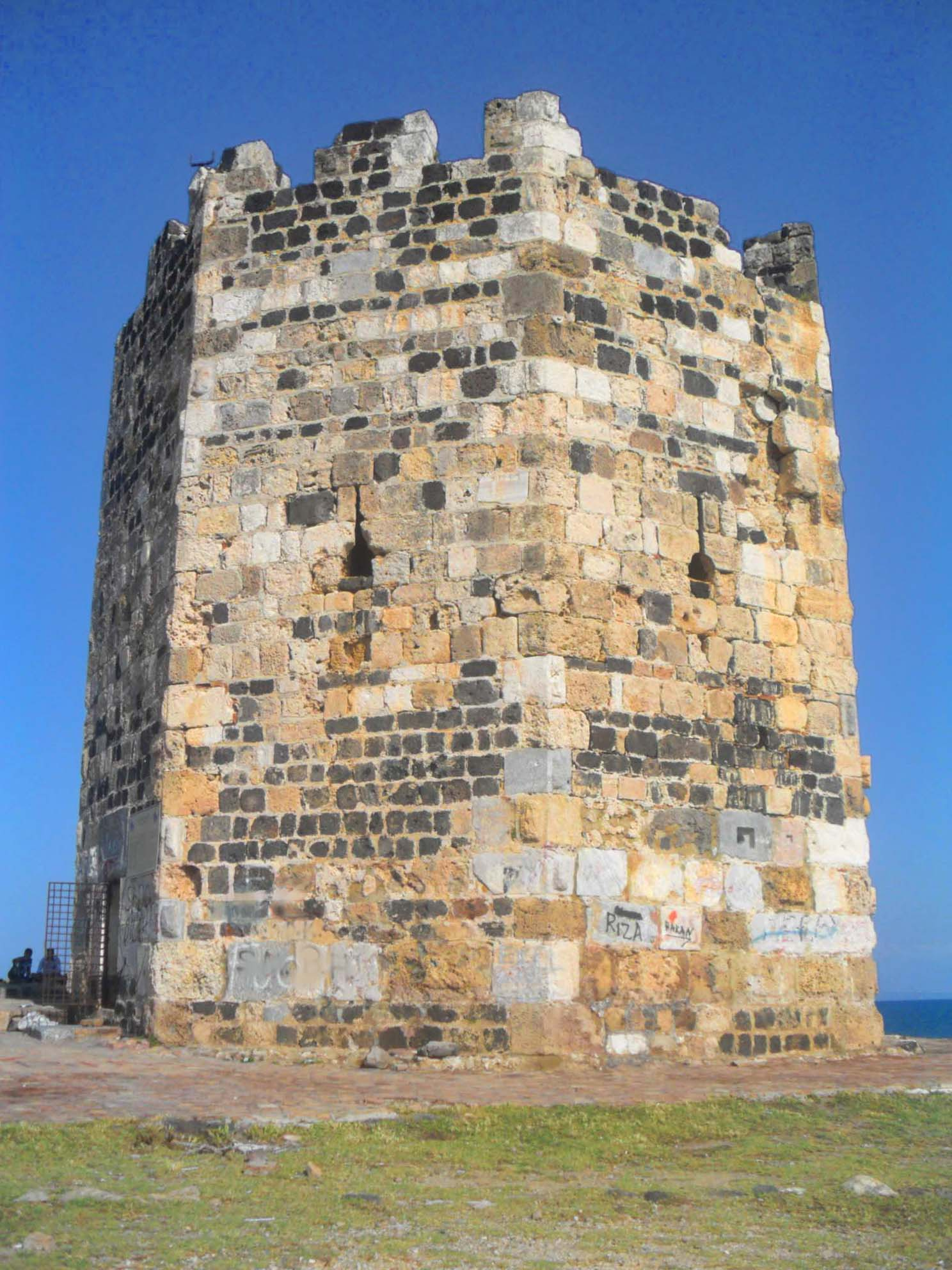
Süleyman's Tower

Süleyman's Tower (also called "armed Ayas tower") is a historical building in Yumurtalık district of Adana Province, Turkey. The tower is situated at the Mediterranean Sea side to the west of Yumurtalık. At 36°46′07″N 35°46′37″E the distance to Yumurtalık district center is 2 kilometres (1.2 mi) and to Adana is 85 kilometres (53 mi).

The building was an observation tower built in 1536 during the reign of Ottoman sultan Süleyman I (called "the Magnificent"). The pentagonal two storey building was built to observe the sea to protect the busy port of Ayas, Adana from a possible pirate assault.
