= Çakırkaya, Pülümür =

Village in Tunceli Province, Turkey

Çakırkaya
- Village
- Location within Turkey
- Coordinates: 39.4353°N 39.7532°E
- Country: Turkey
- Province: Tunceli
- District: Pülümür
- Population (2021): 35
- Time zone: UTC+3 (TRT)

Çakırkaya (Kurdish: Panciras) is a village in the Pülümür District, Tunceli Province, Turkey. The village is populated by Kurds of the Bamasur tribe and had a population of 35 in 2021.
