= Ardıçlı, Pülümür =

Village in Tunceli Province, Turkey

Ardıçlı
- Village
- Location within Turkey
- Coordinates: 39.4968°N 39.8205°E
- Country: Turkey
- Province: Tunceli
- District: Pülümür
- Population (2021): 15
- Time zone: UTC+3 (TRT)

Ardıçlı (Kurdish: Gersunut) is a village in the Pülümür District, Tunceli Province, Turkey. The village is populated by Kurds of the Bamasur tribe and had a population of 15 in 2021.
