= Pülümür =

Municipality of Tunceli Province, Turkey

- Municipality
- Location in Turkey
- Coordinates: 39°29′11″N 39°53′53″E
- Country: Turkey
- Province: Tunceli
- District: Pülümür
- Population (2021): 1,353
- Time zone: UTC+3 (TRT)
- Website: www.pulumur.bel.tr

Pülümür (Kurdish: Pilemor) is a municipality (belde) and seat of Pülümür District, Tunceli Province, Turkey. It is populated by Kurds of the Arel, Lolan and Keman tribes and had a population of 1,353 in 2021.

== Notable people ==
- Hüseyin Kenan Aydın (born 1962), politician
- Sevim Aydin (born 1972), politician
