= Kocatepe, Pülümür =

Village in Tunceli Province, Turkey

Kocatepe
- Village
- Location within Turkey
- Coordinates: 39.4078°N 39.6989°E
- Country: Turkey
- Province: Tunceli
- District: Pülümür
- Population (2021): 138
- Time zone: UTC+3 (TRT)

Kovuklu (Kurdish: Aşkirek) is a village in the Pülümür District, Tunceli Province, Turkey. The village is populated by Kurds of the Bamasur tribe and had a population of 138 in 2021.

The hamlet of Dutpınar attached to the village.
