= Nohutlu, Pülümür =

Village in Tunceli Province, Turkey

Nohutlu
- Village
- Location within Turkey
- Coordinates: 39.4578°N 39.9686°E
- Country: Turkey
- Province: Tunceli
- District: Pülümür
- Population (2021): 9
- Time zone: UTC+3 (TRT)

Nohutlu (Kurdish: Nuxitlîye) is a village in the Pülümür District, Tunceli Province, Turkey. The village is populated by Kurds of the Çarekan and Lolan tribes and had a population of 9 in 2021.
