= Salkımözü, Pülümür =

Village in Tunceli Province, Turkey

Salkımözü
- Village
- Location within Turkey
- Coordinates: 39.6001°N 39.8041°E
- Country: Turkey
- Province: Tunceli
- District: Pülümür
- Population (2021): 53
- Time zone: UTC+3 (TRT)

Salkımözü (Kurdish: Birastik) is a village in the Pülümür District, Tunceli Province, Turkey. The village is populated by Kurds of the Sisan tribe and had a population of 53 in 2021.

The hamlets of Ağacık and Göl are attached to the village.
