= Toptepe, Beytüşşebap =

Village in Şırnak Province, Turkey

Toptepe
- Village
- Location within Turkey
- Coordinates: 37.632°N 43.319°E
- Country: Turkey
- Province: Şırnak
- District: Beytüşşebap
- Population (2023): 32
- Time zone: UTC+3 (TRT)

Toptepe (Kurdish: Kaçet) is a village in the Beytüşşebap District of Şırnak Province in Turkey. The village is populated by Kurds of the Gewdan tribe and had a population of 32 in 2023.

== Population ==
Population history from 2015 to 2023:

Population
Year	Pop.	±%
2015	13	—
2020	13	+0.0%
2023	32	+146.2%
