= Taşlık, Pülümür =

Village in Tunceli Province, Turkey

Taşlık
- Village
- Location within Turkey
- Coordinates: 39.5487°N 40.0689°E
- Country: Turkey
- Province: Tunceli
- District: Pülümür
- Population (2021): 20
- Time zone: UTC+3 (TRT)

Taşlık (also known as Kulantarlası, Kurdish: Çors) is a village in the Pülümür District, Tunceli Province, Turkey. The village is populated by Kurds and had a population of 20 in 2021.
