= Hacılı, Pülümür =

Village in Tunceli Province, Turkey

Hacılı
- Village
- Location within Turkey
- Coordinates: 39.4684°N 39.9541°E
- Country: Turkey
- Province: Tunceli
- District: Pülümür
- Population (2021): 26
- Time zone: UTC+3 (TRT)

Hacılı (Kurdish: Hacilîye) is a village in the Pülümür District, Tunceli Province, Turkey. The village is populated by Kurds and had a population of 26 in 2021.
