= Akdik, Pülümür =

Village in Tunceli Province, Turkey

Akdik
- Village
- Location within Turkey
- Coordinates: 39.3830°N 39.7925°E
- Country: Turkey
- Province: Tunceli
- District: Pülümür
- Population (2021): 16
- Time zone: UTC+3 (TRT)

Akdik (Kurdish: Aynige) is a village in the Pülümür District, Tunceli Province, Turkey. The village is populated by Kurds and had a population of 16 in 2021.

The hamlet of Özenli is attached to the village.

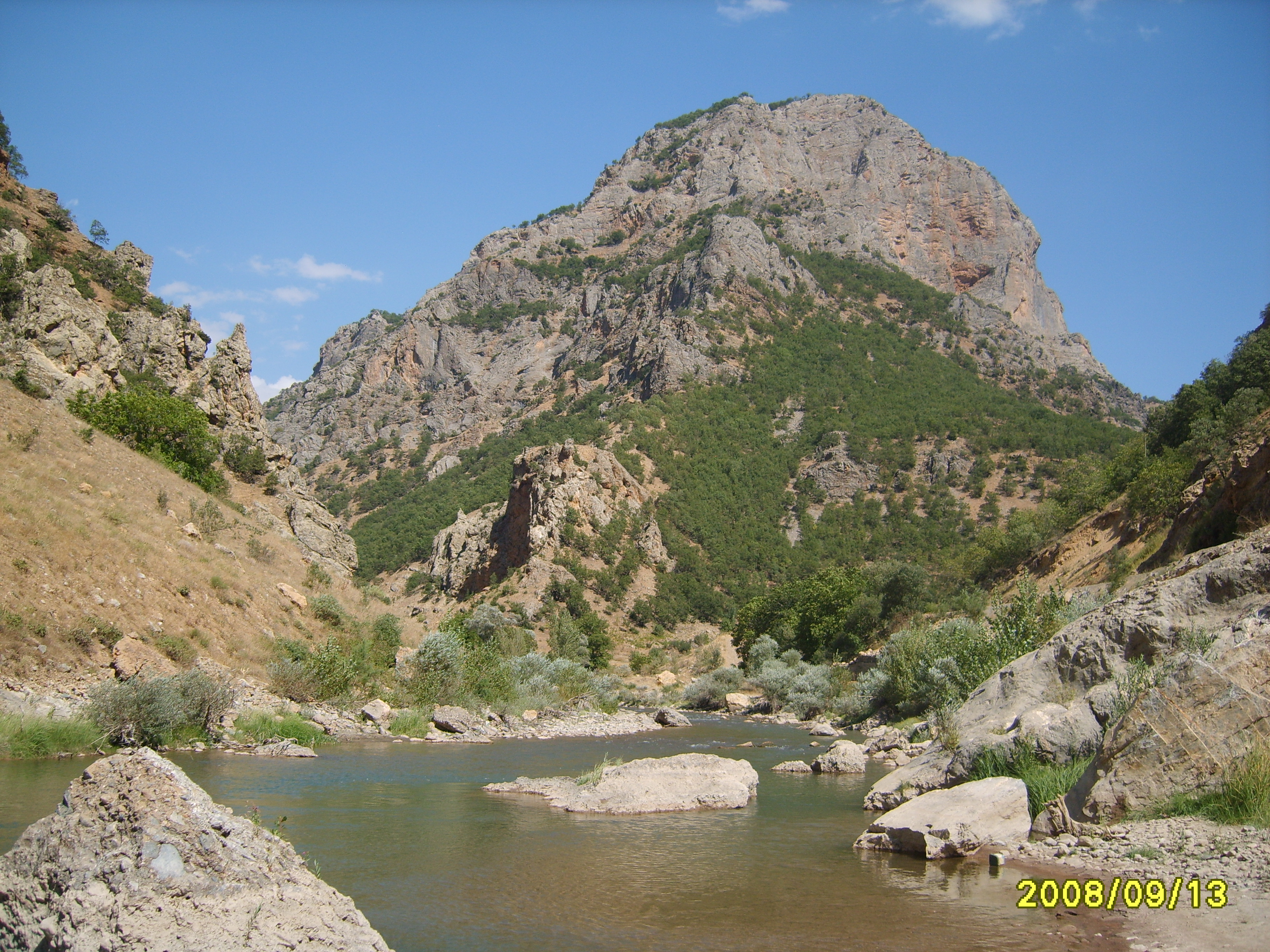
Akdik landscape, Pülümür
