= Hamzalı, Yumurtalık =

Hamzalı
- Neighbourhood
- Location in Turkey
- Coordinates: 36.7820°N 35.6601°E
- Country: Turkey
- Province: Adana
- District: Yumurtalık
- Population (2022): 522
- Time zone: UTC+3 (TRT)

Hamzalı is a neighbourhood in the municipality and district of Yumurtalık, Adana Province, Turkey. Its population is 522 (2022).
