= Kuzulca, Pülümür =

Village in Tunceli Province, Turkey

Kuzulca
- Village
- Location within Turkey
- Coordinates: 39.5453°N 40.0913°E
- Country: Turkey
- Province: Tunceli
- District: Pülümür
- Population (2021): 41
- Time zone: UTC+3 (TRT)

Kuzulca (Kurdish: Guzke) is a village in the Pülümür District, Tunceli Province, Turkey. The village is populated by Kurds of the Balaban tribe and had a population of 41 in 2021.

The hamlets of Aksu, Çağılcık, Çamur, Doluca, Kayılı, Kırmızı, Küllü, Mutlubey, Öbektaş and Uzunkaya are attached to the village.
