= Kuzupınarı, Yumurtalık =

Kuzupınarı
- Neighbourhood
- Location in Turkey
- Coordinates: 36°44′52″N 35°34′02″E
- Country: Turkey
- Province: Adana
- District: Yumurtalık
- Population (2022): 1,538
- Time zone: UTC+3 (TRT)

Kuzupınarı is a neighbourhood in the municipality and district of Yumurtalık, Adana Province, Turkey. Its population is 1,538 (2022).
