= Gökçekonak, Pülümür =

Village in Tunceli Province, Turkey

Gökçekonak
- Village
- Location within Turkey
- Coordinates: 39.4093°N 39.8534°E
- Country: Turkey
- Province: Tunceli
- District: Pülümür
- Population (2021): 38
- Time zone: UTC+3 (TRT)

Gökçekonak (Kurdish: Tasniye) is a village in the Pülümür District, Tunceli Province, Turkey. The village is populated by Kurds of the Balaban tribe and had a population of 38 in 2021.

The hamlets of Ağıldere, Atlıca, Bahçeli, Beyce, Çanakçı, Çatalbaş, Çatılı, Çay, Çobandamı, Ekincik, Gedikli, Harmancık, Karaağaç, Kayacık, Keçili, Muratlı, Pelitli, Poyracık, Poyraz, Seyit, Seyiler, Şemseddin, Yedikardeş, Yıldızlı and Ziyaret are attached to the village.
