= Çobanyıldızı, Pülümür =

Village in Tunceli Province, Turkey

Çobanyıldızı
- Village
- Location within Turkey
- Coordinates: 39.4488°N 39.9099°E
- Country: Turkey
- Province: Tunceli
- District: Pülümür
- Population (2021): 40
- Time zone: UTC+3 (TRT)

Çobanyıldızı (Kurdish: Kinikan) is a village in the Pülümür District, Tunceli Province, Turkey. The village is populated by Kurds of the Keman tribe and had a population of 40 in 2021.

The hamlets of Ayaz, Aydınlar, Beyaztaş, Çayırlı, Değirmendere, Derekomu, Erik, Gözecik, Kalınkaş, Kuşbaşı and Uluca are attached to the village.
