= Kalemli, Yumurtalık =

Kalemli
- Neighbourhood
- Location in Turkey
- Coordinates: 36.7859°N 35.7635°E
- Country: Turkey
- Province: Adana
- District: Yumurtalık
- Population (2022): 197
- Time zone: UTC+3 (TRT)

Kalemli is a neighbourhood in the municipality and district of Yumurtalık, Adana Province, Turkey. Its population is 197 (2022).
