= Dağaltı, Beytüşşebap =

Village in Şırnak Province, Turkey

Dağaltı
- Village
- Location within Turkey
- Coordinates: 37.587°N 43.164°E
- Country: Turkey
- Province: Şırnak
- District: Beytüşşebap
- Population (2023): 180
- Time zone: UTC+3 (TRT)

Dağaltı (Kurdish: Tivor) is a village in the Beytüşşebap District of Şırnak Province in Turkey. The village is populated by Kurds of the Gewdan tribe and had a population of 180 in 2023.

== Population ==
Population history from 2007 to 2023:

Population
Year	Pop.	±%
2007	322	—
2010	317	−1.6%
2015	191	−39.7%
2020	175	−8.4%
2023	180	+2.9%
