= Kovuklu, Pülümür =

Village in Tunceli Province, Turkey

Kovuklu
- Village
- Location within Turkey
- Coordinates: 39.4072°N 39.7628°E
- Country: Turkey
- Province: Tunceli
- District: Pülümür
- Population (2021): 58
- Time zone: UTC+3 (TRT)

Kovuklu (Kurdish: Harşîye) is a village in the Pülümür District, Tunceli Province, Turkey. The village is populated by Kurds of the Lolan tribe and had a population of 58 in 2021.

The hamlets of Çukurca and Mutlu are attached to the village.
