= Elmalı, Pülümür =

Village in Tunceli Province, Turkey

Elmalı
- Village
- Location within Turkey
- Coordinates: 39.5520°N 40.1146°E
- Country: Turkey
- Province: Tunceli
- District: Pülümür
- Population (2021): 49
- Time zone: UTC+3 (TRT)

Elmalı (Kurdish: Almeliye) is a village in the Pülümür District, Tunceli Province, Turkey. The village is populated by Kurds of the Balaban tribe and had a population of 49 in 2021.

The hamlets of Aksu, Çağılcık, Çamur, Doluca, Kayılı, Kırmızı, Küllü, Mutlubey, Öbektaş and Uzunkaya are attached to the village.
