= Gökçe, Beytüşşebap =

Village in Şırnak Province, Turkey

Gökçe
- Village
- Location within Turkey
- Coordinates: 37.651°N 43.223°E
- Country: Turkey
- Province: Şırnak
- District: Beytüşşebap
- Population (2023): 402
- Time zone: UTC+3 (TRT)

Gökçe (Kurdish: Ewrek) is a village in the Beytüşşebap District of Şırnak Province in Turkey. The village is populated by Kurds of the Mamxûran tribe and had a population of 402 in 2023.

The two hamlets of Çağlar and Karapınar are attached to Gökçe.

== Population ==
Population history from 2007 to 2023:

Population
Year	Pop.	±%
2007	218	—
2010	245	+12.4%
2015	154	−37.1%
2020	129	−16.2%
2023	402	+211.6%
