= Közlüce, Pülümür =

Village in Tunceli Province, Turkey

Közlüce
- Village
- Location within Turkey
- Coordinates: 39.4659°N 39.9477°E
- Country: Turkey
- Province: Tunceli
- District: Pülümür
- Population (2021): 19
- Time zone: UTC+3 (TRT)

Közlüce (Kurdish: Zimak) is a village in the Pülümür District, Tunceli Province, Turkey. The village is populated by Kurds of the Abasan tribe and had a population of 19 in 2021.
