= Aşağıdere, Beytüşşebap =

Village in Şırnak Province, Turkey

Aşağıdere
- Village
- Location within Turkey
- Coordinates: 37.507°N 43.119°E
- Country: Turkey
- Province: Şırnak
- District: Beytüşşebap
- Population (2023): 598
- Time zone: UTC+3 (TRT)

Aşağıdere (Kurdish: Kelê jerê) is a village in the Beytüşşebap District of Şırnak Province in Turkey. The village is populated by Kurds of the Jirkî tribe and had a population of 598 in 2023.

The hamlet of Hisarkapı (Setkar) is attached to Aşağıdere.

== Population ==
Population history from 2007 to 2023:

Population
Year	Pop.	±%
2007	649	—
2010	659	+1.5%
2015	653	−0.9%
2020	619	−5.2%
2023	598	−3.4%
