= Kaldırım, Yumurtalık =

Kaldırım
- Neighbourhood
- Location in Turkey
- Coordinates: 36.6905°N 35.5370°E
- Country: Turkey
- Province: Adana
- District: Yumurtalık
- Population (2022): 1,146
- Time zone: UTC+3 (TRT)

Kaldırım is a neighbourhood of the municipality and district of Yumurtalık, Adana Province, Turkey. Its population is 1,146 (2022). Before the 2013 reorganisation, it was a town (belde).
