= Ortalı, Beytüşşebap =

Village in Şırnak Province, Turkey

Ortalı
- Village
- Location within Turkey
- Coordinates: 37.605°N 43.221°E
- Country: Turkey
- Province: Şırnak
- District: Beytüşşebap
- Population (2023): 20
- Time zone: UTC+3 (TRT)

Ortalı (Kurdish: Bêzal) is a village in the Beytüşşebap District of Şırnak Province in Turkey. The village is populated by Kurds of the Gewdan tribe and had a population of 20 in 2023.

== Population ==
Population history from 2007 to 2023:

Population
Year	Pop.	±%
2007	147	—
2010	104	−29.3%
2015	4	−96.2%
2020	14	+250.0%
2023	20	+42.9%
