= Altınhüseyin, Pülümür =

Village in Tunceli Province, Turkey

Altınhüseyin
- Village
- Location within Turkey
- Coordinates: 39.3348°N 40.1085°E
- Country: Turkey
- Province: Tunceli
- District: Pülümür
- Population (2021): 17
- Time zone: UTC+3 (TRT)

Altınhüseyin (Kurdish: Altunu) is a village in the Pülümür District, Tunceli Province, Turkey. The village is populated by Kurds of the Çarekan tribe and had a population of 17 in 2021.

The hamlets of Arılı, Ayranlı, Bahçe, Başeğmez, Buğdaylı, Dalaltı, Dedecik, Düzçatı, Kavacık and Söğütlü are attached to the village.
