= Akarsu, Beytüşşebap =

Village in Şırnak Province, Turkey

Akarsu
- Village
- Location within Turkey
- Coordinates: 37.675°N 43.321°E
- Country: Turkey
- Province: Şırnak
- District: Beytüşşebap
- Population (2023): 86
- Time zone: UTC+3 (TRT)

Akarsu (Kurdish: Tanga xana) is a village in the Beytüşşebap District of Şırnak Province in Turkey. The village is populated by Kurds of the Gewdan tribe and had a population of 86 in 2023.

The six hamlets of Düzkavak, Gölgeli, İkili, Ovacık, Yamaçaltı and Yandere are attached to Akarsu.

== Population ==
Population history from 2007 to 2023:

Population
| Year | Pop. | ±% |
|---|---|---|
| 2007 | 202 | — |
| 2010 | 204 | +1.0% |
| 2015 | 164 | −19.6% |
| 2020 | 136 | −17.1% |
| 2023 | 86 | −36.8% |
