= Kırmızıdam, Yumurtalık =

Kırmızıdam
- Neighbourhood
- Location within Turkey
- Coordinates: 36°42′N 35°30′E
- Country: Turkey
- Province: Adana
- District: Yumurtalık
- Population (2022): 217
- Time zone: UTC+3 (TRT)

Kırmızıdam is a neighbourhood in the municipality and district of Yumurtalık, Adana Province, Turkey. Its population is 217 (2022).

The neighbourhood is populated by Alawites
