= Efeağılı, Pülümür =

Village in Tunceli Province, Turkey

Efeağılı
- Village
- Location within Turkey
- Coordinates: 39.3653°N 39.8641°E
- Country: Turkey
- Province: Tunceli
- District: Pülümür
- Population (2021): 10
- Time zone: UTC+3 (TRT)

Efeağılı (Kurdish: Waremînî) is a village in the Pülümür District, Tunceli Province, Turkey. The village is populated by Kurds of the Kurêşan tribe and had a population of 10 in 2021.

The hamlets of Demirkapı and Güvemcik are attached to the village.
