= Kangallı, Pülümür =

Village in Tunceli Province, Turkey

Kangallı
- Village
- Location within Turkey
- Coordinates: 39.4515°N 39.8523°E
- Country: Turkey
- Province: Tunceli
- District: Pülümür
- Population (2021): 41
- Time zone: UTC+3 (TRT)

Kangallı (Kurdish: Murdafan) is a village in the Pülümür District, Tunceli Province, Turkey. The village is populated by Kurds of the Lolan tribe and had a population of 41 in 2021.

The hamlets of Alikahraman, Gölgecik, Topaklı and Turluk are attached to the village.
