= Yeşilöz, Beytüşşebap =

Village in Şırnak Province, Turkey

Yeşilöz
- Village
- Location within Turkey
- Coordinates: 37.693°N 43.420°E
- Country: Turkey
- Province: Şırnak
- District: Beytüşşebap
- Population (2023): 246
- Time zone: UTC+3 (TRT)

Yeşilöz (Kurdish: Feraşina jorê) is a village in the Beytüşşebap District of Şırnak Province in Turkey. The village is populated by Kurds of the Gewdan tribe and had a population of 246 in 2023.

== Population ==
Population history from 2007 to 2023:

Population
Year	Pop.	±%
2007	269	—
2010	250	−7.1%
2015	277	+10.8%
2020	207	−25.3%
2023	246	+18.8%
