= Narlıören, Yumurtalık =

Narlıören
- Neighbourhood
- Location in Turkey
- Coordinates: 36°52′15″N 35°49′56″E
- Country: Turkey
- Province: Adana
- District: Yumurtalık
- Population (2022): 328
- Time zone: UTC+3 (TRT)

Narlıören is a neighbourhood in the municipality and district of Yumurtalık, Adana Province, Turkey. Its population is 328 (2022).
