= Yeniköy, Yumurtalık =

Yeniköy
- Neighbourhood
- Location in Turkey
- Coordinates: 36°49′04″N 35°46′29″E
- Country: Turkey
- Province: Adana
- District: Yumurtalık
- Population (2022): 302
- Time zone: UTC+3 (TRT)

Yeniköy is a neighbourhood in the municipality and district of Yumurtalık, Adana Province, Turkey. Its population is 302 (2022).
