= Pirinçli, Beytüşşebap =

Village in Şırnak Province, Turkey

Pirinçli
- Village
- Location within Turkey
- Coordinates: 37.521°N 43.036°E
- Country: Turkey
- Province: Şırnak
- District: Beytüşşebap
- Population (2023): 463
- Time zone: UTC+3 (TRT)

Pirinçli (Kurdish: Çemê Heskî) is a village in the Beytüşşebap District of Şırnak Province in Turkey. The village is populated by Kurds of the Jirkî tribe and had a population of 463 in 2023.

The hamlets of Kavaklı (Şkeftereş) and Kayaaltı are attached to Pirinçli.

== Population ==
Population history from 2007 to 2023:

Population
Year	Pop.	±%
2007	677	—
2010	695	+2.7%
2015	623	−10.4%
2020	548	−12.0%
2023	463	−15.5%
