= Güneyyaka, Beytüşşebap =

Village in Şırnak Province, Turkey

Güneyyaka
- Village
- Location within Turkey
- Coordinates: 37.508°N 43.227°E
- Country: Turkey
- Province: Şırnak
- District: Beytüşşebap
- Population (2023): 123
- Time zone: UTC+3 (TRT)

Güneyyaka (Kurdish: Batê) is a village in the Beytüşşebap District of Şırnak Province in Turkey. The village is populated by Kurds of the Jirkî tribe and had a population of 123 in 2023.

== History ==
The Kurdish poet and cleric Mela Huseynê Bateyî was from the village of Batê.

== Population ==
Population history from 2007 to 2023:

Population
Year	Pop.	±%
2007	135	—
2010	133	−1.5%
2015	146	+9.8%
2020	144	−1.4%
2023	123	−14.6%
