= Hasangazi, Pülümür =

Village in Tunceli Province, Turkey

Hasangazi
- Village
- Location within Turkey
- Coordinates: 39.4602°N 40.0032°E
- Country: Turkey
- Province: Tunceli
- District: Pülümür
- Population (2021): 69
- Time zone: UTC+3 (TRT)

Hasangazi (Kurdish: Hesenqaji) is a village in the Pülümür District, Tunceli Province, Turkey. The village is populated by Kurds of the Çarekan tribe and had a population of 69 in 2021.

The hamlets of Ağılcık and Bayraklı are attached to the village.
