= Bölücek, Beytüşşebap =

Village in Şırnak Province, Turkey

Bölücek
- Village
- Location within Turkey
- Coordinates: 37.490°N 43.197°E
- Country: Turkey
- Province: Şırnak
- District: Beytüşşebap
- Population (2023): 359
- Time zone: UTC+3 (TRT)

Bölücek (Kurdish: Pîrosa) is a village in the Beytüşşebap District of Şırnak Province in Turkey. The village is populated by Kurds of non-tribal affiliation and had a population of 359 in 2023.

The four hamlets of Ballı, Çakıcı, Değirmenlı and Güvendik are attached to Bölücek.

== Population ==
Population history from 2007 to 2023:

Population
Year	Pop.	±%
2007	567	—
2010	573	+1.1%
2015	462	−19.4%
2020	399	−13.6%
2023	359	−10.0%
