= Doğanpınar, Pülümür =

Village in Tunceli Province, Turkey

Doğanpınar
- Village
- Location within Turkey
- Coordinates: 39.596°N 39.827°E
- Country: Turkey
- Province: Tunceli
- District: Pülümür
- Population (2021): 128
- Time zone: UTC+3 (TRT)

Doğanpınar (Kurdish: Pindige) is a village in the Pülümür District, Tunceli Province, Turkey. The village is populated by Kurds of the Sisan tribe and had a population of 128 in 2021.

The hamlet of Bük is attached to the village.
