= Deveciuşağı, Yumurtalık =

Deveciuşağı
- Neighbourhood
- Location in Turkey
- Coordinates: 36°46′N 35°38′E
- Country: Turkey
- Province: Adana
- District: Yumurtalık
- Population (2022): 616
- Time zone: UTC+3 (TRT)

Deveciuşağı is a neighbourhood in the municipality and district of Yumurtalık, Adana Province, Turkey. Its population is 616 (2022).
