= Başkalecik, Pülümür =

Village in Tunceli Province, Turkey

Başkalecik
- Village
- Location within Turkey
- Coordinates: 39.5644°N 39.8638°E
- Country: Turkey
- Province: Tunceli
- District: Pülümür
- Population (2021): 54
- Time zone: UTC+3 (TRT)

Başkalecik (Kurdish: Qelezuxe) is a village in the Pülümür District, Tunceli Province, Turkey. The village is populated by Kurds of the Balaban tribe and had a population of 54 in 2021.

The hamlets of Alanlı, Dal, Göneli, Karaağaç, Kengerli, Kırtepe, Kuruçay, Tanışıt and Taşkıran are attached to the village.
