= Dereboyu, Pülümür =

Village in Tunceli Province, Turkey

Dereboyu
- Village
- Location within Turkey
- Coordinates: 39.4548°N 39.7986°E
- Country: Turkey
- Province: Tunceli
- District: Pülümür
- Population (2021): 36
- Time zone: UTC+3 (TRT)

Dereboyu (Kurdish: Danzig) is a village in the Pülümür District, Tunceli Province, Turkey. The village is populated by Kurds of the Bamasur tribe and had a population of 36 in 2021.

The hamlets of Aksüt, Karataş, Koçdere, Külekli, Pamuklu, Sal and Yumrutaş are attached to the village.
