= Üçdam, Pülümür =

Village in Tunceli Province, Turkey

Üçdam
- Village
- Location within Turkey
- Coordinates: 39.5668°N 40.1782°E
- Country: Turkey
- Province: Tunceli
- District: Pülümür
- Population (2021): 22
- Time zone: UTC+3 (TRT)

Üçdam (Kurdish: Eşîl) is a village in the Pülümür District, Tunceli Province, Turkey. The village is populated by Kurds of the Çarekan tribe and had a population of 22 in 2021.

The hamlets of Düzce, Kaşucu, Örencik and Veliağa are attached to the village.
