= Kırklar, Pülümür =

Village in Tunceli Province, Turkey

Kırklar
- Village
- Location within Turkey
- Coordinates: 39.4686°N 40.0436°E
- Country: Turkey
- Province: Tunceli
- District: Pülümür
- Population (2021): 40
- Time zone: UTC+3 (TRT)

Kırklar (Kurdish: Pergînî) is a village in the Pülümür District, Tunceli Province, Turkey. The village is populated by Kurds of the Çarekan tribe and had a population of 40 in 2021.

The hamlets of Aydınoğlu, Gökçeli, Karagöl, Mahmutağa, Öğütlü, Örenşehir, Uçankuş, Ulucak, Yolbilir and Ziyaret are attached to the village.
