= Sağlamtaş, Pülümür =

Village in Tunceli Province, Turkey

Sağlamtaş
- Village
- Location within Turkey
- Coordinates: 39.4694°N 39.8181°E
- Country: Turkey
- Province: Tunceli
- District: Pülümür
- Population (2021): 50
- Time zone: UTC+3 (TRT)

Sağlamtaş (Kurdish: Çirik) is a village in the Pülümür District, Tunceli Province, Turkey. The village is populated by Kurds of the Lolan tribe and had a population of 50 in 2021.
