= Ilıcak, Beytüşşebap =

Village in Şırnak Province, Turkey

Ilıcak
- Village
- Location within Turkey
- Coordinates: 37.590°N 43.129°E
- Country: Turkey
- Province: Şırnak
- District: Beytüşşebap
- Population (2023): 391
- Time zone: UTC+3 (TRT)

Ilıcak (Kurdish: Germav) is a village in the Beytüşşebap District of Şırnak Province in Turkey. The village is populated by Kurds of the Kaşuran tribe and had a population of 391 in 2023.

== Population ==
Population history from 2007 to 2023:

Population
Year	Pop.	±%
2007	498	—
2010	487	−2.2%
2015	439	−9.9%
2020	420	−4.3%
2023	391	−6.9%
