= Yumurtalık =

- District and municipality
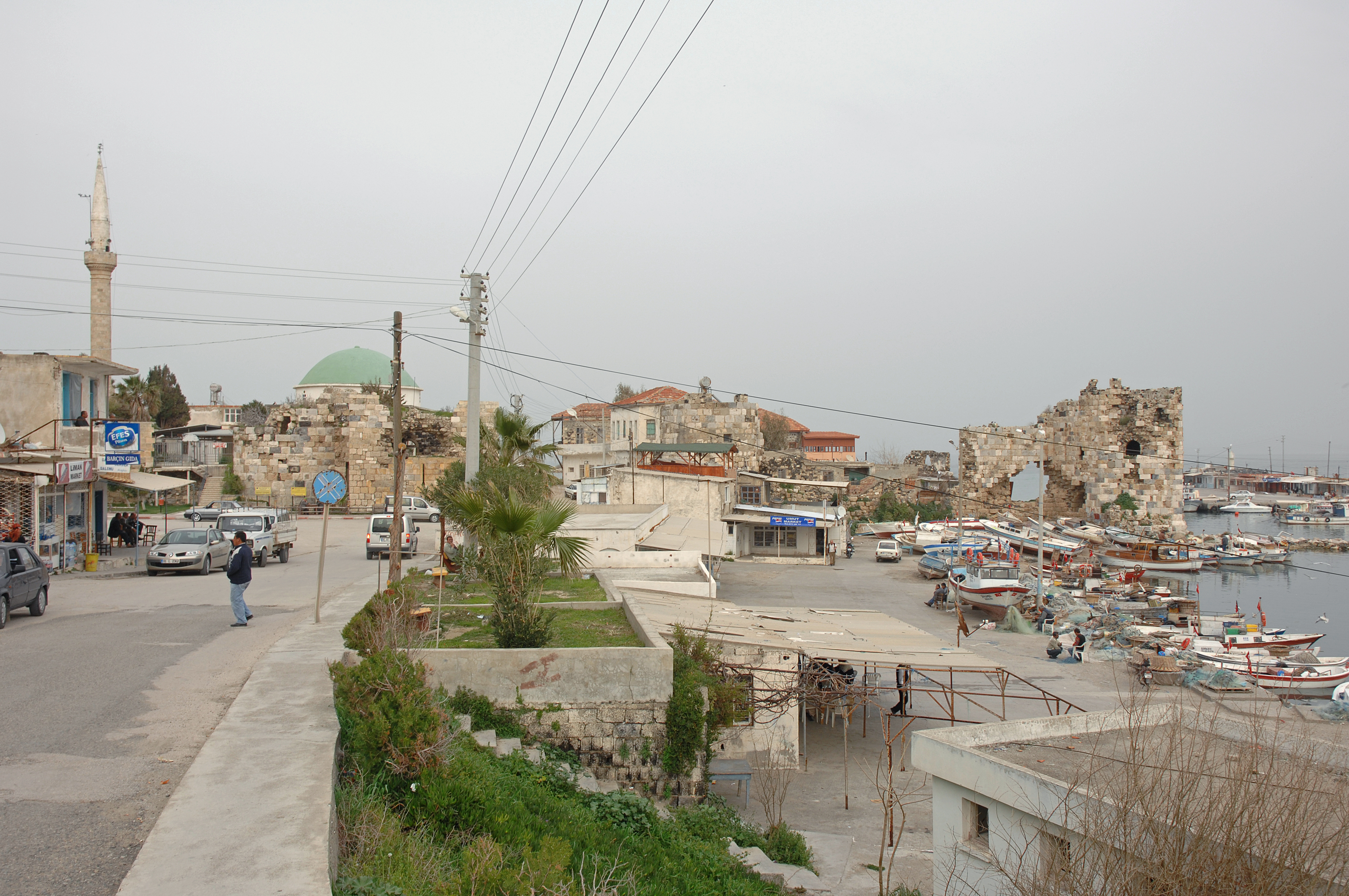
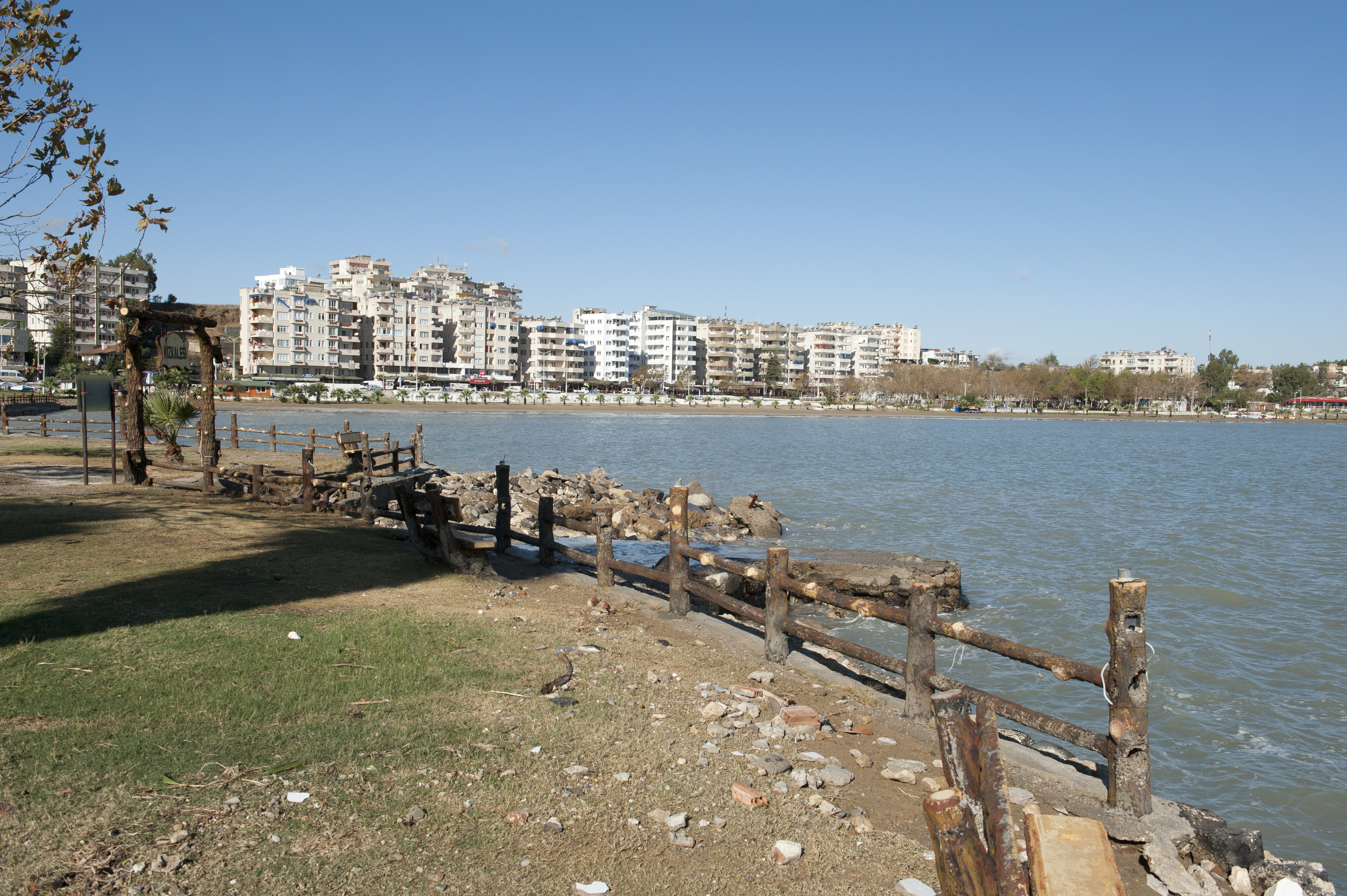
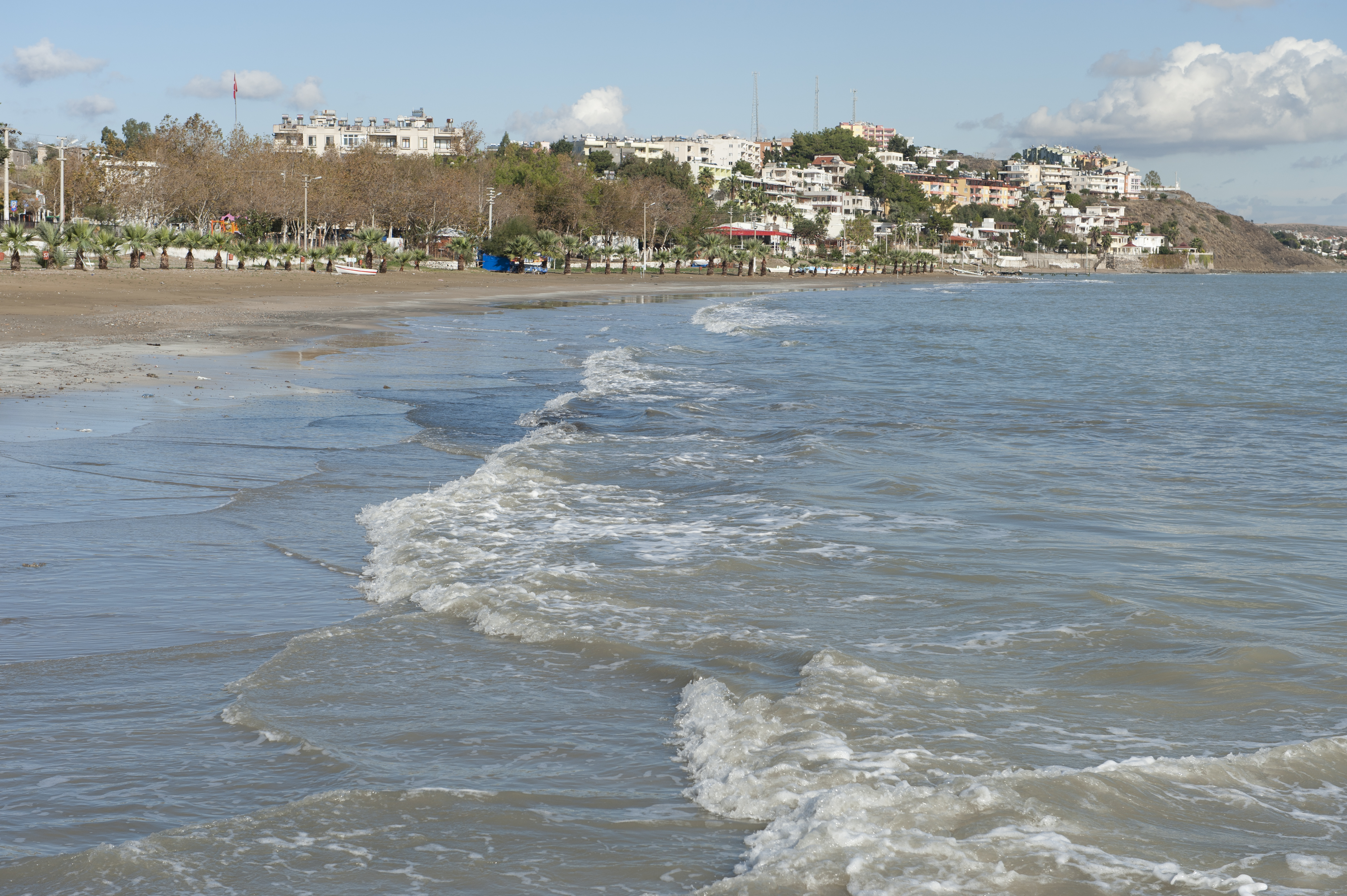

- Map showing Yumurtalık District in Adana Province

- Location within Turkey
- Coordinates: 36°46′04″N 35°47′32″E
- Country: Turkey
- Province: Adana

Government
  - Mayor: Erdinç Altiok (AKP)
- Area: 447 km^{2} (173 sq mi)
- Elevation: 20 m (66 ft)
- Population (2022): 17,654
  - Density: 39.5/km^{2} (102/sq mi)
- Time zone: UTC+3 (TRT)
- Postal code: 01680
- Area code: 0322
- Website: www.yumurtalik.bel.tr

Yumurtalık (Turkish: [juˈmuɾtaɫɯk]), formerly called Aegeae, Ayas, Lyeys or Laiazzo, is a municipality and district of Adana Province, Turkey. Its area is 447 km^{2}, and its population is 17,654 (2022). It is a Mediterranean port and resort town at a distance of about 40 km (25 mi) from Adana city. The resident population of the town Yumurtalık is 5,739 (2022), but in the summer, it rises to 40,000 people since many inhabitants of Adana have holiday homes here. There are also many daily visitors during the holiday season.

Yumurtalık has a large free economic zone housing the production units of up to thirty companies presently in operation or in phase of being built. Fields of activities include industries ranging from petrochemicals, synthetic fibers and steel industry, and there are also plans for establishing a major shipyard.

== History ==
The port has a long history, dating to at least 2000 BC. Hittite pottery of the 17th century BC has been found in the mound of Zeytinbeli Höyük.

This Cilician port city is located on the Gulf of Issus, the modern Gulf of İskenderun. It was mentioned by Pausanias under the name Aegeae (Ancient Greek: Αἰγέαι, Aigéai), a name that appears also in its coinage. In Strabo's time it was a small port city.

Tacitus mentions Aegeae in his account of the war between Armenia and Rome on one side and Iberia and Parthia on the other. A Greek inscription of the Roman period has been discovered there, and under Roman dominion it was a place of some importance. It was organized as part of the province of Cilicia. Apollonius of Tyana (c. 15 – c. 100) conducted his early studies in Aegeae, when the city was at its cultural height.

It was Christianised at an early date, and while no longer retaining a residential bishop, remains a titular see of the Roman Catholic Church under the name of Aegeae. The Saints Cosmas and Damian are mentioned in Christian hagiography to have been twin brothers, physicians who practiced their profession in Aegeae, accepting no payment for their services, and eventually suffering martyrdom under Diocletian.

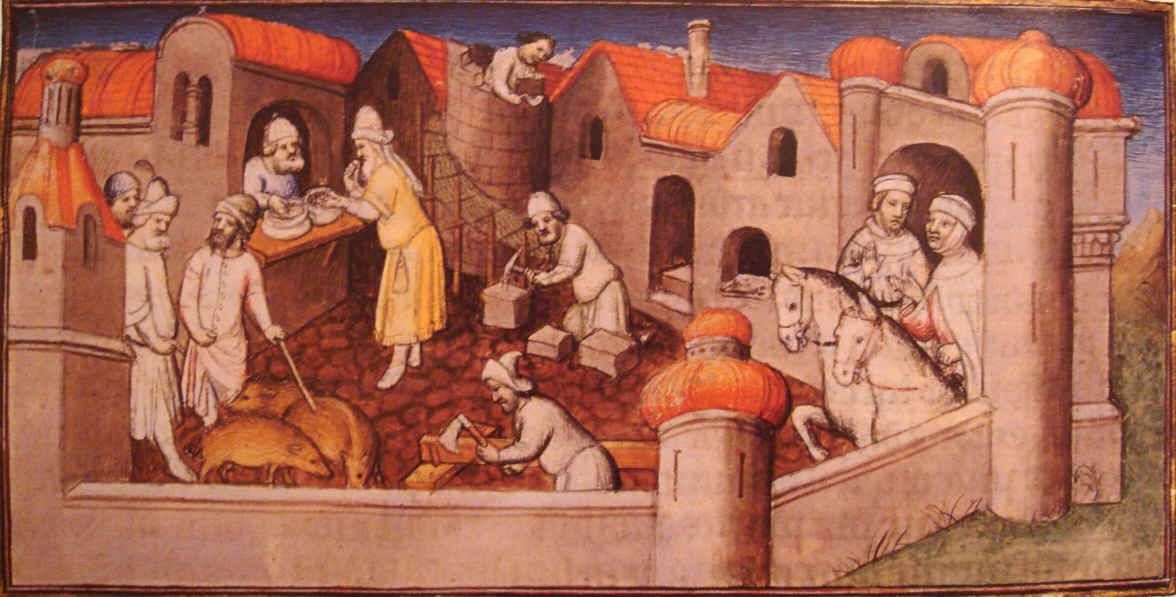
A view of the busy port of Laiazzo when Marco Polo visited it in 1271, as presented in Le Livre des Merveilles

In the Middle Ages, particularly in the 13th century, Aegeae grew to become an important Mediterranean port of the Armenian Kingdom of Cilicia. It was known locally as Ayas (Armenian: Այաս), which became Aiazzo or (incorporating the definite article) Laiazzo in Venetian and other European languages. The fall of Acre and the silting up of the harbour of Tarsus—together with the advantage of Ayas's good roads eastward—led to the city briefly becoming the principal centre of trade between West and East during the High Middle Ages. Numerous treaties were negotiated in which the Armenian kings granted various trade privileges to several Italian city-states. Between 1266 and 1322 raids by Mamluks and Turkmen in the area caused only minor disruptions in mercantile activities. Marco Polo disembarked here to begin his trip to China in 1271, he reportedly described it as a “city good for good trade,” adding that “all spices, silk, gold and wool from inland were carried to this town.” The Battle of Laiazzo in 1294, in which the navy of the Republic of Genoa overcame that of the Republic of Venice, is thought by some to be that in which Marco Polo later became a prisoner of the Genoese. Within the city a quarter and trading post belonging to another of the Italian maritime republics, Pisa, was also established.

The city was increasingly oppressed by the Mamluks and fell definitively into their hands in 1347. When European trade routes with the East moved away from the Mediterranean, the city and its harbour lost their importance. Subsequently, it was ruled by the Anatolian beylik of Ramadanids. Yumurtalık (Ottoman Turkish: يمورطالق, meaning "Egglike") fell to the Ottoman Empire in the 16th century and then became part of the Turkish Republic in the 20th century. In 1974, actor and film director Yılmaz Güney was arrested at Yumurtalık after a shooting incident that involved the murder of a Yumurtalık judge.

=== Ecclesiastical History ===
Christianity came early to Aegeae, to judge by the numerous martyrs recorded in the Acta Sanctorum and the Greek menologia, of whom the most famous are Saints Cosmas and Damian, commemorated in the Roman Martyrology under 26 September.

The martyr Zenobius is traditionally considered to be the first bishop of Aegeae. Tarcodimantus, an Arian, was bishop at the time of the First Council of Nicaea (325). Patrophilus was a correspondent of Basil the Great; another unnamed bishop of Aegeae was an adversary of John Chrysostom; Eustathius was at the Council of Chalcedon (351) and was a correspondent of Theodoret; Julius was expelled from his see by Byzantine Emperor Justin I in 518 because of supporting Monophysitism; Thomas was at a synod in Mopsuestia in 550; and Paschalius was at the Second Council of Constantinople in 553. As indicated in a 6th-century Notitiae Episcopatuum, the see itself was a suffragan of the metropolitan see of Anazarbus, the capital of the Roman province of Cilicia, to which Aegeae belonged.

=== Titular see ===
No longer a residential bishopric, presumably faded under Islam, Aegeae is today listed by the Catholic Church as a titular see, the diocese having been nominally restored in the 18th century as a titular bishopric.

It is vacant since decades, having had the following incumbents of the lowest (episcopal) rank (except the first) :

- Titular Archbishop Jakub Stefan Augustynowicz (1737.02.11 – 1751.12.22)
- Jean-Baptiste-Marie Bron (1754.01.14 – 1775.11.15?)
- Michel Joseph de Laulanhier (1776.01.29 – 1788)
- Giovanni Maria Bisignani (1824.05.24 – ?)
- Francisco Orueta y Castrillón, Oratorians (C.O.) (1855.09.28 – 1859.09.26), later Bishop of Trujillo (Peru) (1859.09.26 – 1873.03.21), Metropolitan Archbishop of Lima (Peru) (1873.03.21 – 1886.08.25)
- Francesco Domenico Raynaud, Capuchin Franciscans (O.F.M. Cap.) (1867.12.12 – 1885.05.05) as Apostolic Vicar of Sofia–Plovdiv (Bulgaria) (1867.12.12 – 1885); emeritate as Titular Archbishop of Stauropolis (1885.05.05 – 1893.07.24)
- Jacques-Victor-Marius Rouchouse (駱書雅), Paris Foreign Missions Society (M.E.P.) (1916.01.28 – 1946.04.11)
- John Joseph Wright (1947.05.10 – 1950.01.28) as Auxiliary Bishop of Boston (USA) (1947.05.10 – 1950.01.28); later Bishop of Worcester (USA) (1950.01.28 – 1959.01.23), Bishop of Pittsburgh (USA) (1959.01.23 – 1969.04.23), Prefect of the Roman Sacred Congregation for Clergy (1969.04.23 – 1979.08.10), created Cardinal-Priest of Gesù Divin Maestro alla Pineta Sacchetti (1969.04.30 – 1979.08.10)
- Michel-Jules-Joseph-Marie Bernard, Spiritans C.S.Sp. (1950.03.12 – 1955.09.14), as Apostolic Vicar of Conakry (Guinea) (1950.03.12 – 1954.07.18) & Vicar Apostolic of Brazzaville (Congo-Brazzaville) (1954.07.18 – 1955.09.14); later promoted first Metropolitan Archbishop of Brazzaville (1955.09.14 – 1964.05.02), Titular Archbishop of Aræ in Mauretania (1964.05.02 – 1966.01.15), Archbishop-Bishop of Nouakchott (Mauritania) (1966.01.15 – 1973.12.21)
- Francisco de Borja Valenzuela Ríos (1956.05.24 – 1957.08.20), as Bishop-Prelate of Territorial Prelature of Copiapó (Chile) (1955.06.27 – 1956.05.24 and 1956.05.24 – 1957.08.20); later Bishop of Antofagasta (Chile) (1957.08.20 – 1967.06.28), also Apostolic Administrator of Territorial Prelature of Calama (Chile) (1965.07.21 – 1968.05.19), promoted first Metropolitan Archbishop of Antofagasta (1967.06.28 – 1974.03.25), again Apostolic Administrator of Calama (1970.04 – 1970.06.02), also Archbishop-Bishop of San Felipe (Chile) (1974.03.25 – 1983.05.03), President of Episcopal Conference of Chile (1977 – 1980), Archbishop-Bishop of Valparaíso (Chile) (1983.05.03 – 1993.04.16)
- José Joaquim Ribeiro (1957.11.30 – 1967.01.31)

== Fortifications ==
This site has both land and sea castles as well as a polygonal watchtower.

The single curving wall that constitutes the surviving land castle closes the tip of a small peninsula and is surrounded by the old town. The now missing seaward wall, which once followed the shore to enclose the entire ward, was visible in the late 19th century. Three round towers and a polygonal bastion survive as well as several casemates with loopholes (shooting ports) and at least seven embrasured windows. The basic plan of the fortress may have been laid in late antiquity, but extensive rebuilding belongs to the early period of Ottoman occupation, when it served as a minor port for the fleet of Suleiman the Magnificent.

The sea castle, which is located on an island about 400 meters east of the shore, consists of a tight cluster of five chambers encased in a massive irregular bastion. Attached is a badly damaged circuit wall that surrounds most of the island. The vaulted rooms and enclosures were probably storage areas for merchandise destined for Europe. Although there are the distinct traces of late antique foundations (e.g., dovetail sockets), the peculiar masonry and construction techniques of the sea castle are those typically used during Armenian Kingdom of Cilicia and may date from the reported re-fortification of the harbour in A.D. 1282.

The watchtower, which is located 1.5 kilometers west of the land castle, was built by Suleiman the Magnificent in the mid 16th century with spolia from the nearby late antique city. The lower two floors are covered with stone vaults. The loopholes in the walls of all three levels are identical in design to those in the nearby Ottoman fortress of Payas.

== Yumurtalık today ==
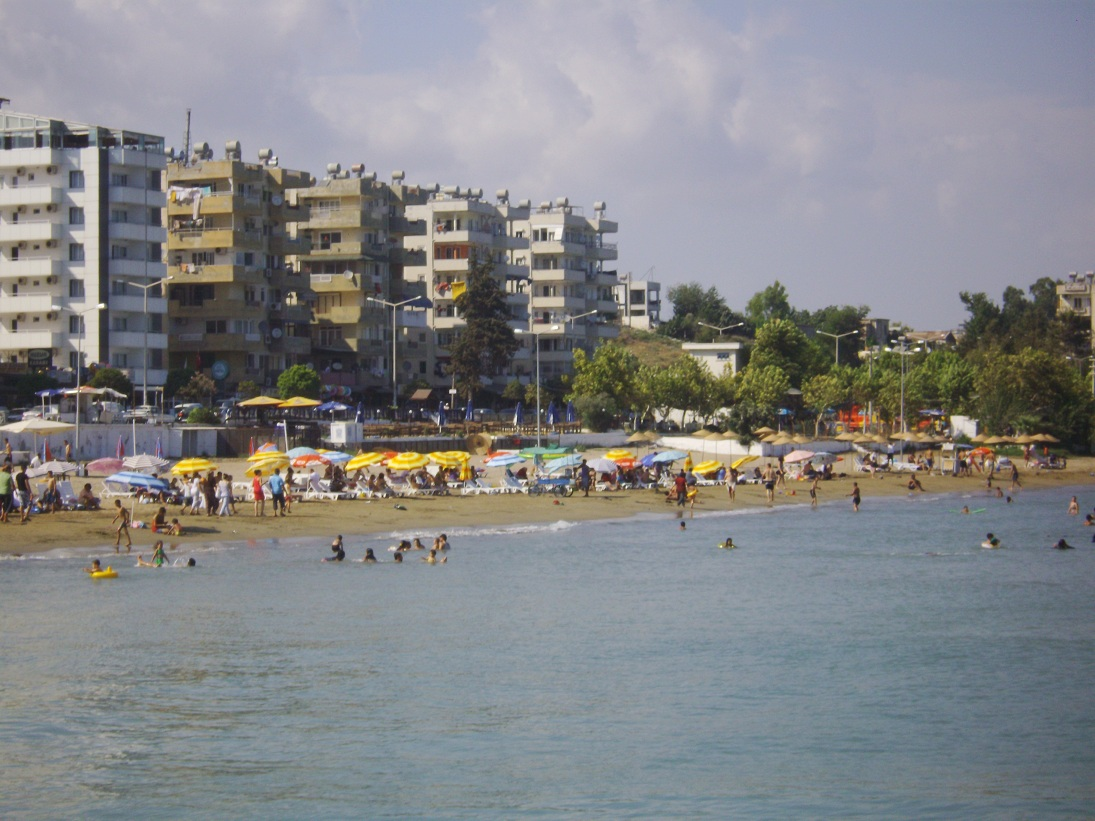
Yumurtalık Beach

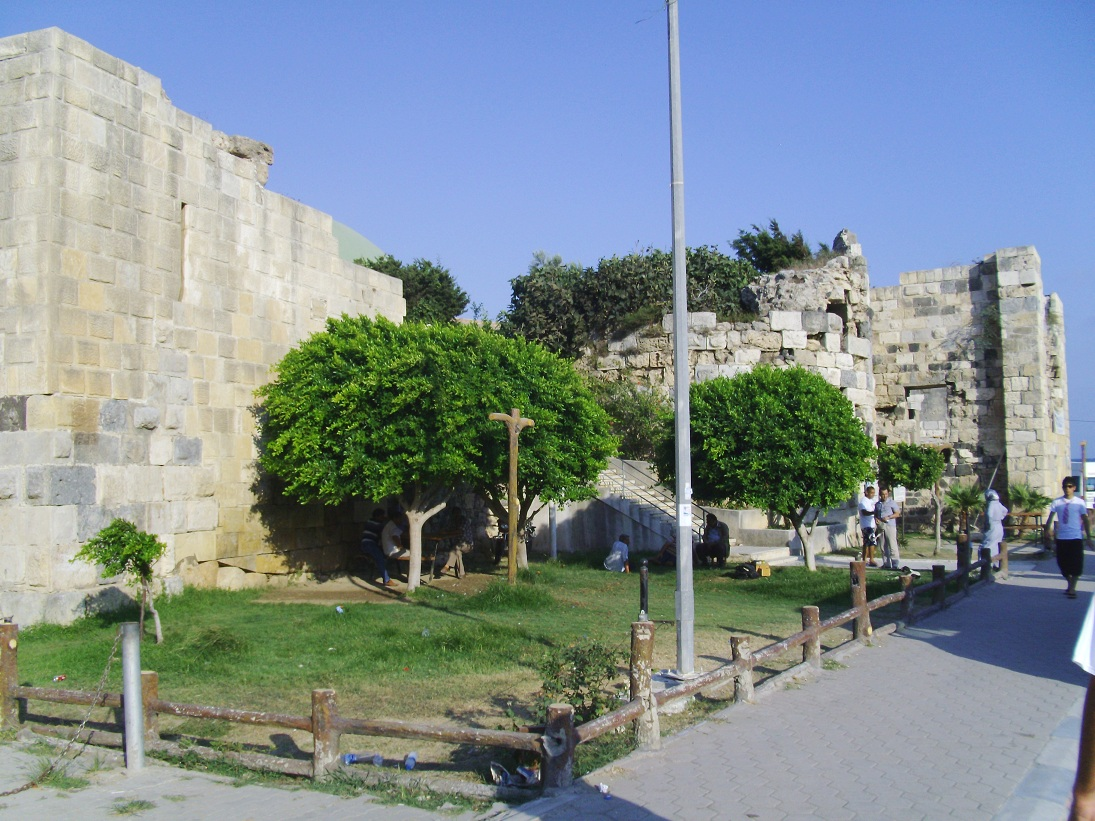
Ayas Castle

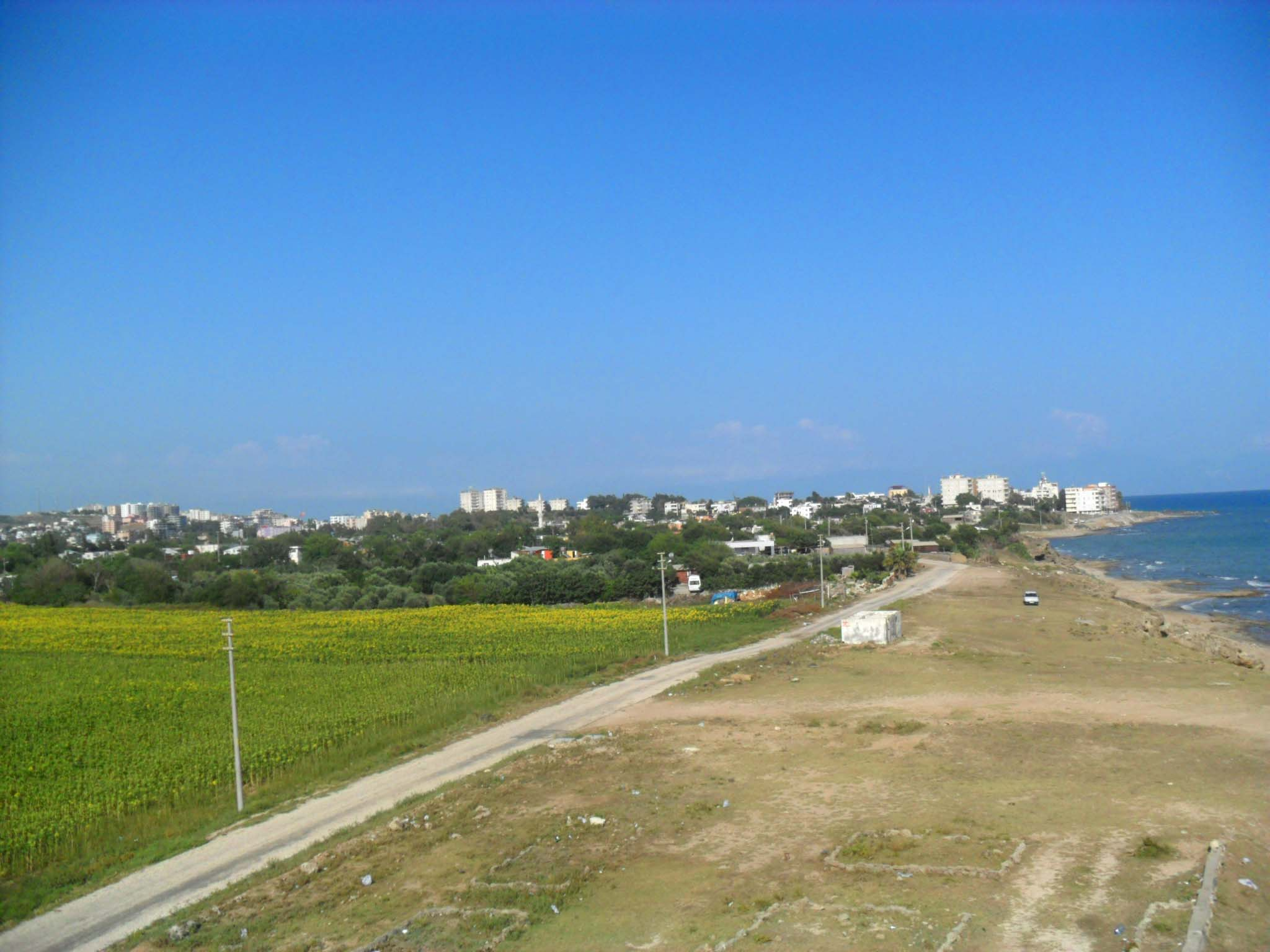
Yumurtalık seen from Süleyman's Tower

The sea is clean and there is still a relaxed feel to this coast, so Yumurtalık is a holiday and weekend retreat for the people of Adana and of other cities in Çukurova region, who come to stay in seaside holiday flats generally built in compounds. There are also small hotels and guest houses for occasional visitor who can swim during the day and stroll along the beach or into the village in the evenings. The public beaches are not very well kept by the municipality, and they are sometimes covered with litter. But the holiday villages have private beaches which are kept clean and can also be used by outsiders for a small daily entrance fee.

A number of beaches in Yumurtalık are also the nesting places for loggerhead sea turtle caretta caretta breed. In fact the amount of beach-front holiday property is also part of the problem, even though the sand is clean the turtles won't lay eggs in these busy beaches with neon-lit discothèques blasting out all night. Adequate protection for the turtle's nesting habitat continues to remain a critical question. These endangered species lay eggs only in Yumurtalık, in Akyatan beach in neighboring Karataş district and in İztuzu Beach in Dalyan in southwestern Turkey. In fact, the very name Yumurtalık means, among other things, egg nest in Turkish language.

As well as tourism, the fertile agricultural lands that extend behind the coast are also a key factor in local economy and quality tomatoes, watermelons and other fruits and vegetables are extensively produced in Yumurtalık.

Just outside Yumurtalık is the Botaş oil and natural gas terminal. It is the end of the Kirkuk–Ceyhan Oil Pipeline running from Northern Iraq, which was opened in the 1970s. Refined oils are also imported through here by sea. Immediately to the southwest, there is the oil terminal for crude oil pipeline from Baku, opened in 2006. Further in the same direction, there is the recently built İsken Sugözü coal-fired power station.

== Composition ==
There are 24 neighbourhoods in Yumurtalık District:

- Akdeniz
- Akyuva
- Asmalı
- Ayas
- Ayvalık
- Demirtaş
- Deveciuşağı
- Devrişiye
- Gölovası
- Hamzalı
- Haylazlı
- Kaldırım
- Kalemli
- Kemalpaşa
- Kesmeburun
- Kırmızıdam
- Kuzupınarı
- Narlıören
- Ören
- Sugözü
- Yeniköy
- Yeşilköy
- Yumurtalık
- Zeytinbeli

== Climate ==
Yumurtalık has a hot-summer Mediterranean climate (Köppen: Csa), with hot, dry and muggy summers, and mild, rainy winters.

Climate data for Yumurtalık (1991–2020)
Month	Jan	Feb	Mar	Apr	May	Jun	Jul	Aug	Sep	Oct	Nov	Dec	Year
Mean daily maximum °C (°F)	15.2 (59.4)	16.3 (61.3)	19.1 (66.4)	22.5 (72.5)	25.9 (78.6)	29.0 (84.2)	31.3 (88.3)	32.7 (90.9)	31.7 (89.1)	28.5 (83.3)	22.2 (72.0)	17.0 (62.6)	24.3 (75.7)
Daily mean °C (°F)	10.5 (50.9)	11.4 (52.5)	14.1 (57.4)	17.5 (63.5)	21.2 (70.2)	24.7 (76.5)	27.5 (81.5)	28.5 (83.3)	26.3 (79.3)	22.7 (72.9)	16.8 (62.2)	12.3 (54.1)	19.5 (67.1)
Mean daily minimum °C (°F)	7.0 (44.6)	7.4 (45.3)	9.9 (49.8)	13.1 (55.6)	16.7 (62.1)	20.4 (68.7)	23.7 (74.7)	24.4 (75.9)	21.8 (71.2)	18.1 (64.6)	12.6 (54.7)	8.8 (47.8)	15.4 (59.7)
Average precipitation mm (inches)	128.8 (5.07)	106.5 (4.19)	81.5 (3.21)	57.0 (2.24)	53.0 (2.09)	23.7 (0.93)	8.0 (0.31)	4.3 (0.17)	28.9 (1.14)	52.4 (2.06)	104.7 (4.12)	143.8 (5.66)	792.4 (31.20)
Average precipitation days (≥ 1.0 mm)	8.5	8.3	7.4	5.8	4.7	2.4	1.3	1.6	3.6	4.7	6.0	9.0	63.3
Average relative humidity (%)	61.2	61.8	64.7	69.1	71.7	73.2	74.6	72.8	66.7	59.3	55.8	61.2	66.1
Source: NOAA

== Places of interest ==
- Ayas castle is reported to be the dock used by Marco Polo when travelling to China.
- The tower of Suleyman
- Loggerhead sea turtle (Caretta caretta) beaches.

There are also picnic areas, a beach and birdwatching facilities in the lagoon.

== Notable people ==
- Zenobios and Zenobia (d. c. 290), bishop of Aegae and his sister, martyrs and Eastern Orthodox saints

== Sources and external links ==
- Media related to Yumurtalık at Wikimedia Commons
- Official website (in Turkish)
- Gigacatholic with titular see incumbent biography links
- Adana Yumurtalık Free Zone
- Yumurtalık Photographs
- Extensive photographic survey and plans of the fortifications at Ayas / Yumurtalık
