= Ünveren, Pülümür =

Village in Tunceli Province, Turkey

Ünveren
- Village
- Location within Turkey
- Coordinates: 39.5538°N 40.01448°E
- Country: Turkey
- Province: Tunceli
- District: Pülümür
- Population (2021): 36
- Time zone: UTC+3 (TRT)

Ünveren (Kurdish: Mukuf) is a village in the Pülümür District, Tunceli Province, Turkey. The village is populated by Kurds of the Balaban tribe and had a population of 36 in 2021.

The hamlet of Fındık is attached to the village.
