= Turnadere, Pülümür =

Village in Tunceli Province, Turkey

Turnadere
- Village
- Location within Turkey
- Coordinates: 39.4556°N 39.9203°E
- Country: Turkey
- Province: Tunceli
- District: Pülümür
- Population (2021): 45
- Time zone: UTC+3 (TRT)

Turnadere (Kurdish: Rabat) is a village in the Pülümür District, Tunceli Province, Turkey. The village is populated by Kurds of the Keman tribe and had a population of 45 in 2021.
