= Göcenek, Pülümür =

Village in Tunceli Province, Turkey

Göcenek
- Village
- Location within Turkey
- Coordinates: 39.4736°N 39.9701°E
- Country: Turkey
- Province: Tunceli
- District: Pülümür
- Population (2021): 14
- Time zone: UTC+3 (TRT)

Göcenek (Kurdish: Gozanage) is a village in the Pülümür District, Tunceli Province, Turkey. The village is populated by Kurds of the Çarekan tribe and had a population of 14 in 2021.

The hamlets of Aşağıgöcenek, Erencik, Keremli, Konaklar and Köşkerler are attached to the village.
