= Senek, Pülümür =

Village in Tunceli Province, Turkey

Senek
- Village
- Location within Turkey
- Coordinates: 39.5509°N 39.888°E
- Country: Turkey
- Province: Tunceli
- District: Pülümür
- Population (2021): 37
- Time zone: UTC+3 (TRT)

Senek (Kurdish: Şêneke) is a village in the Pülümür District, Tunceli Province, Turkey. The village is populated by Kurds of the Balaban tribe and had a population of 37 in 2021.

The hamlets of Doğancık and Kahraman are attached to the village.
