= Derindere, Pülümür =

Village in Tunceli Province, Turkey

Derindere
- Village
- Location within Turkey
- Coordinates: 39.5318°N 40.2395°E
- Country: Turkey
- Province: Tunceli
- District: Pülümür
- Population (2021): 58
- Time zone: UTC+3 (TRT)

Derindere (Kurdish: Karsku) is a village in the Pülümür District, Tunceli Province, Turkey. The village is populated by Kurds and had a population of 58 in 2021.

The hamlets of Erdem, Yeniköy and Yukarıderindere are attached to the village.
