= Söğütce, Beytüşşebap =

Village in Şırnak Province, Turkey

Söğütce
- Village
- Location within Turkey
- Coordinates: 37.593°N 43.241°E
- Country: Turkey
- Province: Şırnak
- District: Beytüşşebap
- Population (2023): 39
- Time zone: UTC+3 (TRT)

Söğütce (Kurdish: Govik) is a village in the Beytüşşebap District of Şırnak Province in Turkey. The village is populated by Kurds of the Gewdan tribe and had a population of 39 in 2023.

The hamlet of Yaşar is attached to Gökçe.

== Population ==
Population history from 2007 to 2023:

Population
Year	Pop.	±%
2007	69	—
2010	73	+5.8%
2015	50	−31.5%
2020	41	−18.0%
2023	39	−4.9%
