= Süleymanuşağı, Pülümür =

Village in Tunceli Province, Turkey

Süleymanuşağı
- Village
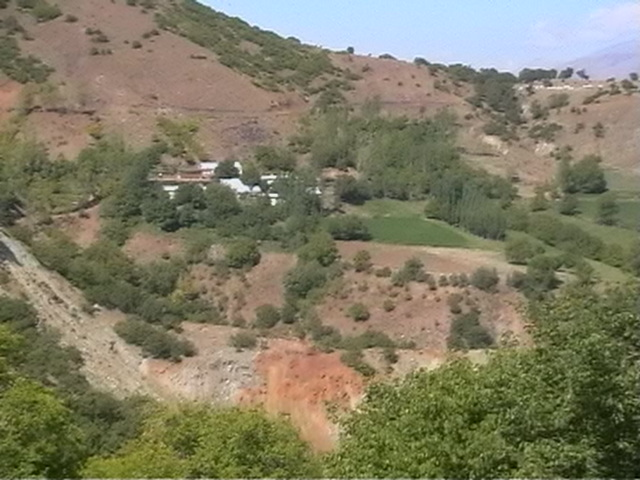

- Location within Turkey
- Coordinates: 39.5492°N 39.9925°E
- Country: Turkey
- Province: Tunceli
- District: Pülümür
- Population (2021): 47
- Time zone: UTC+3 (TRT)

Süleymanuşağı (Kurdish: Silêmanu) is a village in the Pülümür District, Tunceli Province, Turkey. The village is populated by Kurds of the Rutan tribe and had a population of 47 in 2021.

The hamlets of Algılı, Çakırlı, Heybeli, Köse and Sızmalı are attached to the village.
