= Çağlayan, Pülümür =

Village in Tunceli Province, Turkey

Çağlayan
- Village
- Location within Turkey
- Coordinates: 39.4419°N 39.9356°E
- Country: Turkey
- Province: Tunceli
- District: Pülümür
- Population (2021): 66
- Time zone: UTC+3 (TRT)

Çağlayan (Kurdish: Ferxedin) is a village in the Pülümür District, Tunceli Province, Turkey. The village is populated by Kurds of the Kurêşan tribe and had a population of 66 in 2021.

The hamlets of Alagöz, Deretarla, Kaşoğlu and Kırmızıtarla are attached to the village.
