= Şampaşakaraderbendi, Pülümür =

Village in Tunceli Province, Turkey

Şampaşakaraderbendi
- Village
- Location within Turkey
- Coordinates: 39.4552°N 40.2456°E
- Country: Turkey
- Province: Tunceli
- District: Pülümür
- Population (2021): 36
- Time zone: UTC+3 (TRT)

Şampaşakaraderbendi (Kurdish: Şampaşa Qeredewran) is a village in the Pülümür District, Tunceli Province, Turkey. The village is populated by Kurds of the Çarekan tribe and had a population of 36 in 2021.

The hamlets of Aşağışenocak, Düşünceli, Emlik, Geceyatmaz, Göktepe, Gölgecik, Saltaş, Yenikapı and Yukarışenocak are attached to the village.
