= Kızılmescit, Pülümür =

Village in Tunceli Province, Turkey

Kızılmescit
- Village
- Location within Turkey
- Coordinates: 39.4098°N 40.1487°E
- Country: Turkey
- Province: Tunceli
- District: Pülümür
- Population (2021): 8
- Time zone: UTC+3 (TRT)

Kızılmescit (Kurdish: Sorê) is a village in the Pülümür District, Tunceli Province, Turkey. The village is populated by Kurds of the Çarekan tribe and had a population of 8 in 2021.

The hamlets of Çaltıyanı, Çatan, Çevrecik, Göl, Göveçli, Kanlı, Kuşhane, Rabat, Tanrıverdi and Uzundere are attached to the village.
