= Yarbaşı, Pülümür =

Village in Tunceli Province, Turkey

Yarbaşı
- Village
- Location within Turkey
- Coordinates: 39.5517°N 39.9698°E
- Country: Turkey
- Province: Tunceli
- District: Pülümür
- Population (2021): 35
- Time zone: UTC+3 (TRT)

Yarbaşı (Kurdish: Gerişê) is a village in the Pülümür District, Tunceli Province, Turkey. The village is populated by Kurds of Balaban tribe and had a population of 35 in 2021.

The hamlets of Aktekin, Barışlı, Bayramlı, Bozağaç, Burgulu, Dolubakraç, Döldere, Esmecik, İmrendi, Özbaşı and Taşyuva are attached to the village.
