= Kırdım, Pülümür =

Village in Tunceli Province, Turkey

Kırdım
- Village
- Location within Turkey
- Coordinates: 39.5239°N 40.3025°E
- Country: Turkey
- Province: Tunceli
- District: Pülümür
- Population (2021): 48
- Time zone: UTC+3 (TRT)

Kırdım (Kurdish: Qirdim) is a village in the Pülümür District, Tunceli Province, Turkey. The village is populated by Kurds of the Çarekan tribe and had a population of 48 in 2021.

The hamlets of Akyamaç, Alazlı, Aşağıbostanyurdu, Bostanyurdu, Dilimcik, Elmalı, Göğebakan, Kalecik, Kayadelen, Kılıçtutan, Kızılbel, Maltepe, Oymataş, Taht, Yeniköy and Yeşilsırt are attached to the village.
