= Kesmeburun, Yumurtalık =

Coordinates: 36°45′52″N 35°29′26″E

Kesmeburun
- Neighbourhood
- Location in Turkey
- Coordinates
- Country: Turkey
- Province: Adana
- District: Yumurtalık
- Population (2022): 71
- Time zone: UTC+3 (TRT)

Kesmeburun is a neighbourhood in the municipality and district of Yumurtalık, Adana Province, Turkey. Its population is 71 (2022).
