= Dereköy, Pülümür =

Village in Tunceli Province, Turkey

Dereköy
- Village
- Location within Turkey
- Coordinates: 39.5834°N 39.8100°E
- Country: Turkey
- Province: Tunceli
- District: Pülümür
- Population (2021): 50
- Time zone: UTC+3 (TRT)

Dereköy (Kurdish: Derîye) is a village in the Pülümür District, Tunceli Province, Turkey. The village is populated by Kurds of the Balaban tribe and had a population of 50 in 2021.

The hamlets of Armutlu, Aşağıdereköy, Güllübağ, Kelek, Mahmut and Pınarlı are attached to the village.
