= Boğazören, Beytüşşebap =

Village in Şırnak Province, Turkey

Boğazören
- Village
- Location within Turkey
- Coordinates: 37.528°N 43.007°E
- Country: Turkey
- Province: Şırnak
- District: Beytüşşebap
- Population (2023): 713
- Time zone: UTC+3 (TRT)

Boğazören (Kurdish: Kitêr) is a village in the Beytüşşebap District of Şırnak Province in Turkey. The village is populated by Kurds of the Jirkî tribe and had a population of 713 in 2023.

The hamlets of Akat and Konuklu are attached to Boğazören.

== Population ==
Population history from 2007 to 2023:

Population
Year	Pop.	±%
2007	780	—
2010	850	+9.0%
2015	838	−1.4%
2020	777	−7.3%
2023	713	−8.2%
