= Sugözü, Yumurtalık =

Sugözü
- Neighbourhood
- Location in Turkey
- Coordinates: 36°50′33″N 35°51′34″E
- Country: Turkey
- Province: Adana
- District: Yumurtalık
- Population (2022): 787
- Time zone: UTC+3 (TRT)

Sugözü is a neighbourhood in the municipality and district of Yumurtalık, Adana Province, Turkey. Its population is 787 (2022).
