= Oymakaya, Beytüşşebap =

Village in Şırnak Province, Turkey

Oymakaya
- Village
- Location within Turkey
- Coordinates: 37.423°N 43.231°E
- Country: Turkey
- Province: Şırnak
- District: Beytüşşebap
- Population (2023): 733
- Time zone: UTC+3 (TRT)

Oymakaya (Kurdish: Dûhlê) is a village in the Beytüşşebap District of Şırnak Province in Turkey. The village is populated by Kurds of the Kaşuran tribe and had a population of 733 in 2023.

The hamlets of Dutlu, Karlıca, Taşarası (Berman) and Üçyol are attached to Boğazören.

== Population ==
Population history from 2007 to 2023:

Population
Year	Pop.	±%
2007	940	—
2010	1,003	+6.7%
2015	965	−3.8%
2020	845	−12.4%
2023	733	−13.3%
