= Asmalı, Yumurtalık =

Asmalı
- Neighbourhood
- Location in Turkey
- Coordinates: 36°45′18″N 35°31′34″E
- Country: Turkey
- Province: Adana
- District: Yumurtalık
- Population (2022): 1,011
- Time zone: UTC+3 (TRT)

Asmalı is a neighbourhood in the municipality and district of Yumurtalık, Adana Province, Turkey. Its population is 1,011 (2022).
