= Dağyolu, Pülümür =

Village in Tunceli Province, Turkey

Dağyolu
- Village
- Location within Turkey
- Coordinates: 39.5409°N 39.9083°E
- Country: Turkey
- Province: Tunceli
- District: Pülümür
- Population (2021): 79
- Time zone: UTC+3 (TRT)

Dağyolu (Kurdish: Şeterî) is a village in the Pülümür District, Tunceli Province, Turkey. The village is populated by Kurds of the Balaban tribe and had a population of 79 in 2021.

The hamlets of Armağan, Bölücek, Çekem, Değirmendere, Eğribük, Elmalı, Geçimli, Göl, Gürbulak, İnanlı, Kadıdere, Kahraman, Kemik, Keskin, Kuşhane, Tarlabaşı, Uşaklı and Yayğılı are attached to the village.
