= Akçayol, Beytüşşebap =

Village in Şırnak Province, Turkey

Akçayol
- Village
- Location within Turkey
- Coordinates: 37.533°N 43.018°E
- Country: Turkey
- Province: Şırnak
- District: Beytüşşebap
- Population (2023): 683
- Time zone: UTC+3 (TRT)

Akçayol (Kurdish: Şekalwa) is a village in the Beytüşşebap District of Şırnak Province in Turkey. The village is populated by Kurds of the Jirkî tribe and had a population of 683 in 2023.

== Population ==
Population history from 2007 to 2023:

Population
Year	Pop.	±%
2007	788	—
2010	879	+11.5%
2015	815	−7.3%
2020	764	−6.3%
2023	683	−10.6%
