= Beşağaç, Beytüşşebap =

Village in Şırnak Province, Turkey

Beşağaç
- Village
- Location within Turkey
- Coordinates: 37.467°N 43.248°E
- Country: Turkey
- Province: Şırnak
- District: Beytüşşebap
- Population (2023): 312
- Time zone: UTC+3 (TRT)

Beşağaç (Kurdish: Hemka) is a village in the Beytüşşebap District of Şırnak Province in Turkey. The village is populated by Kurds of non-tribal affiliation and had a population of 312 in 2023.

The hamlet of Altınsu is attached to Beşağaç.

== Population ==
Population history from 2007 to 2023:

Population
Year	Pop.	±%
2007	265	—
2010	300	+13.2%
2015	324	+8.0%
2020	313	−3.4%
2023	312	−0.3%
