= Doğanyol, Beytüşşebap =

Village in Şırnak Province, Turkey

Doğanyol
- Village
- Location within Turkey
- Coordinates: 37.677°N 43.433°E
- Country: Turkey
- Province: Şırnak
- District: Beytüşşebap
- Population (2023): 17
- Time zone: UTC+3 (TRT)

Doğanyol (Kurdish: Pîrdoda) is a village in the Beytüşşebap District of Şırnak Province in Turkey. The village is populated by Kurds of the Gewdan tribe and had a population of 17 in 2023.

The two hamlets of Erler and Geçitli are attached to Doğanyol.

== Population ==
Population history from 2016 to 2023:

Population
Year	Pop.	±%
2016	1	—
2018	11	+1000.0%
2020	9	−18.2%
2023	17	+88.9%
