= Bozağakaraderbendi, Pülümür =

Village in Tunceli Province, Turkey

Bozağakaraderbendi
- Village
- Location within Turkey
- Coordinates: 39.442°N 39.995°E
- Country: Turkey
- Province: Tunceli
- District: Pülümür
- Population (2021): 46
- Time zone: UTC+3 (TRT)

Bozağakaraderbendi (Kurdish: Qeredewranê Bozaxayî) is a village in the Pülümür District, Tunceli Province, Turkey. The village is populated by Kurds of the Çarekan tribe and has a population of 46 in 2021.

The hamlets of Akçatı, Balpayam, Çağlayan, Çerciler, Ekinözü, Güğümlü, Karaderbent, Karataş, Kolan, Mercimek, Ocaklı, Oğulcuk, Rüstem, Seksenveren, Sungurcuk, Yalıntaş and Yazıcı are attached to the village.
