= Sarıgül, Pülümür =

Village in Tunceli Province, Turkey

Sarıgül
- Village
- Location within Turkey
- Coordinates: 39.39222°N 39.6795°E
- Country: Turkey
- Province: Tunceli
- District: Pülümür
- Population (2021): 23
- Time zone: UTC+3 (TRT)

Sarıgül (Kurdish: Mazra/Berav) is a village in the Pülümür District, Tunceli Province, Turkey. The village is populated by Kurds and had a population of 23 in 2021.
