= Kabadal, Pülümür =

Village in Tunceli Province, Turkey

Kabadal
- Village
- Location within Turkey
- Coordinates: 39.4522°N 39.8421°E
- Country: Turkey
- Province: Tunceli
- District: Pülümür
- Population (2021): 26
- Time zone: UTC+3 (TRT)

Kabadal (Kurdish: Açirer) is a village in the Pülümür District, Tunceli Province, Turkey. The village is populated by Kurds and had a population of 26 in 2021.

The hamlets of Genç, Kamışlar and Yaylalı are attached to the village.
