= Pülümür District =

District of Tunceli Province, Turkey

- District
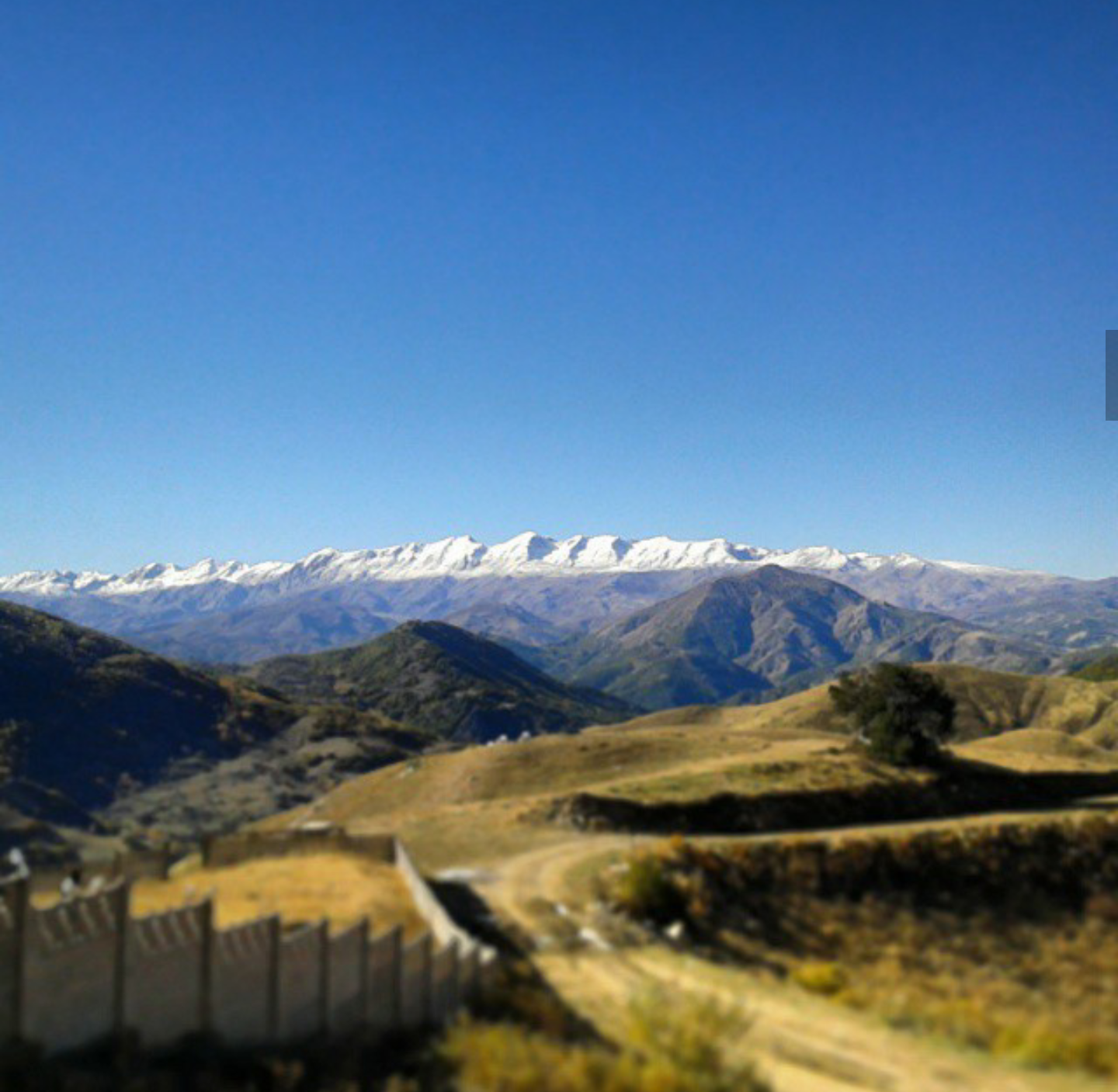
- Munzur mountains

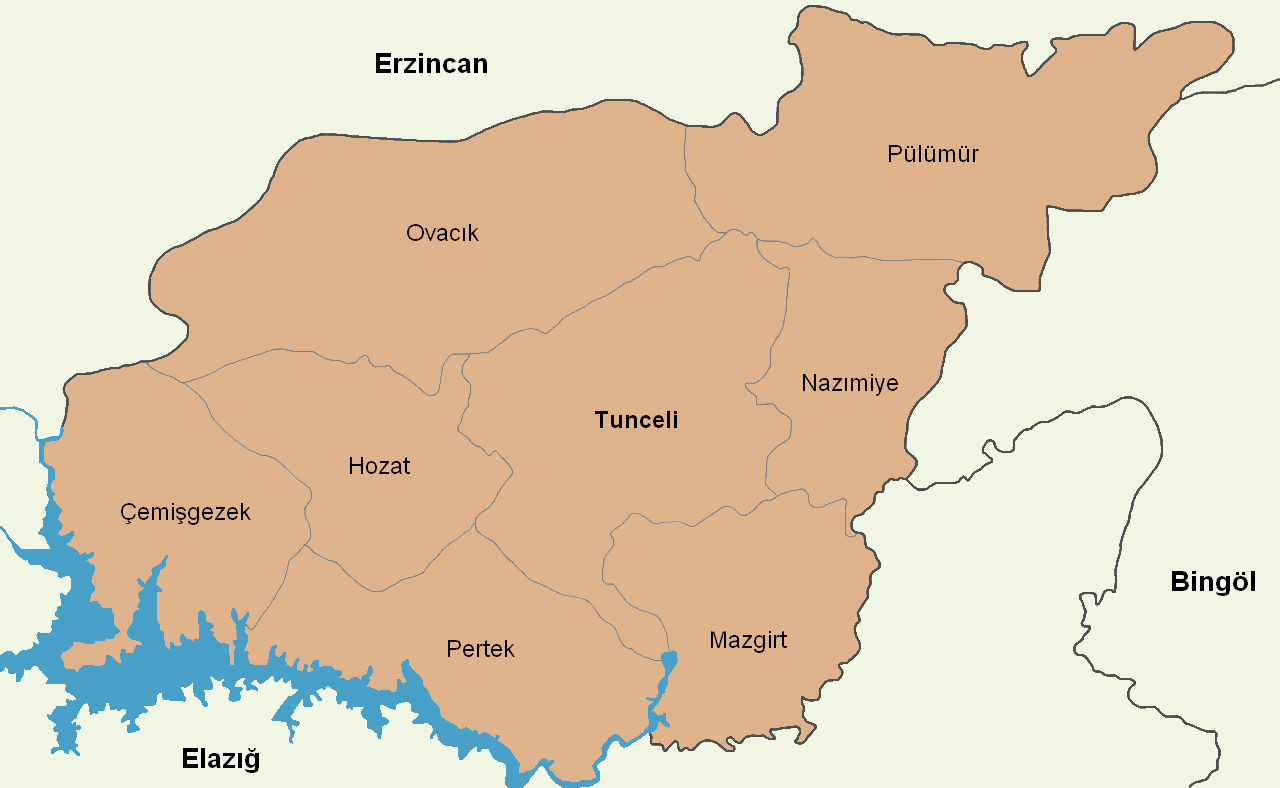
- Map showing Pülümür District in Tunceli Province

- Location within Turkey
- Coordinates: 39°28′N 39°59′E
- Country: Turkey
- Province: Tunceli
- Seat: Pülümür
- Area: 1,437 km^{2} (555 sq mi)
- Population (2021): 3,282
  - Density: 2.284/km^{2} (5.915/sq mi)
- Time zone: UTC+3 (TRT)
- Website: www.pulumur.gov.tr

Pülümür District is a district of Tunceli Province in Turkey. The town of Pülümür is its seat and the district had a population of 3,282 in 2021. Its area is 1,437 km^{2}.

== Composition ==
Beside the town of Pülümür, the district encompasses forty-nine villages and 267 hamlets.

1. Ağaşenliği
2. Akdik
3. Altınhüseyin
4. Ardıçlı
5. Bardakçı
6. Başkalecik
7. Boğalı
8. Bozağakaraderbendi
9. Çağlayan
10. Çakırkaya
11. Çobanyıldızı
12. Dağbek
13. Dağyolu
14. Dereboyu
15. Dereköy
16. Derindere
17. Doğanpınar
18. Efeağılı
19. Elmalı
20. Göcenek
21. Gökçekonak
22. Hacılı
23. Hasangazi
24. Kabadal
25. Kangallı
26. Karagöz
27. Kayırlar
28. Kaymaztepe
29. Kırdım
30. Kırklar
31. Kırkmeşe
32. Kızılmescit
33. Kocatepe
34. Kovuklu
35. Közlüce
36. Kuzulca
37. Mezraa
38. Nohutlu
39. Sağlamtaş
40. Salkımözü
41. Sarıgül
42. Senek
43. Süleymanuşağı
44. Şampaşakaraderbendi
45. Taşlık
46. Turnadere
47. Üçdam
48. Ünveren
49. Yarbaşı
