= Haylazlı, Yumurtalık =

Haylazlı
- Neighbourhood
- Location in Turkey
- Coordinates: 36°47′N 35°40′E
- Country: Turkey
- Province: Adana
- District: Yumurtalık
- Population (2022): 338
- Time zone: UTC+3 (TRT)

Haylazlı is a neighbourhood in the municipality and district of Yumurtalık, Adana Province, Turkey. Its population is 338 (2022).
