= Kaymaztepe, Pülümür =

Village in Tunceli Province, Turkey

Kaymaztepe
- Village
- Location within Turkey
- Coordinates: 39.4010°N 39.7975°E
- Country: Turkey
- Province: Tunceli
- District: Pülümür
- Population (2021): 8
- Time zone: UTC+3 (TRT)

Kaymaztepe (Kurdish: Meçî) is a village in the Pülümür District, Tunceli Province, Turkey. The village is populated by Kurds of the Arel tribe and had a population of 8 in 2021.

The hamlets of Bağ and Mikail are attached to the village.
