= Günyüzü, Beytüşşebap =

Village in Şırnak Province, Turkey

Günyüzü
- Village
- Location within Turkey
- Coordinates: 37.462°N 43.163°E
- Country: Turkey
- Province: Şırnak
- District: Beytüşşebap
- Population (2023): 415
- Time zone: UTC+3 (TRT)

Günyüzü (Kurdish: Mesele) is a village in the Beytüşşebap District of Şırnak Province in Turkey. The village is populated by Kurds of the Kaşuran tribe and had a population of 415 in 2023.

== Population ==
Population history from 2007 to 2023:

Population
Year	Pop.	±%
2007	347	—
2010	391	+12.7%
2015	404	+3.3%
2020	443	+9.7%
2023	415	−6.3%
