= Koyunoba, Beytüşşebap =

Village in Şırnak Province, Turkey

Koyunoba
- Village
- Location within Turkey
- Coordinates: 37.533°N 43.037°E
- Country: Turkey
- Province: Şırnak
- District: Beytüşşebap
- Population (2023): 221
- Time zone: UTC+3 (TRT)

Koyunoba (Kurdish: Zerbêl) is a village in the Beytüşşebap District of Şırnak Province in Turkey. The village is populated by Kurds of the Jirkî tribe and had a population of 221 in 2023.

== Population ==
Population history from 2007 to 2023:

Population
Year	Pop.	±%
2007	173	—
2010	197	+13.9%
2015	225	+14.2%
2020	237	+5.3%
2023	221	−6.8%
