= Zeytinbeli, Yumurtalık =

Zeytinbeli
- Neighbourhood
- Location in Turkey
- Coordinates: 36°49′N 35°44′E
- Country: Turkey
- Province: Adana
- District: Yumurtalık
- Population (2022): 1,398
- Time zone: UTC+3 (TRT)

Zeytinbeli is a neighbourhood of the municipality and district of Yumurtalık, Adana Province, Turkey. Its population is 1,398 (2022). Before the 2013 reorganisation, it was a town (belde).

In the mound of Zeytinbeli Höyük, Hittite pottery of the 17th century BC has been found.
