= Boğalı, Pülümür =

Village in Tunceli Province, Turkey

Boğalı
- Village
- Location within Turkey
- Coordinates: 39.4063°N 39.7436°E
- Country: Turkey
- Province: Tunceli
- District: Pülümür
- Population (2021): 22
- Time zone: UTC+3 (TRT)

Boğalı (Kurdish: Zimege) is a village in the Pülümür District, Tunceli Province, Turkey. The village is populated by Kurds of the Bamasur tribe and had a population of 22 in 2021.

The hamlets of Bulut and Söğütlü are attached to the village.
