= Ağaşenliği, Pülümür =

Village in Tunceli Province, Turkey

Ağaşenliği
- Village
- Location within Turkey
- Coordinates: 39.3773°N 40.1037°E
- Country: Turkey
- Province: Tunceli
- District: Pülümür
- Population (2021): 13
- Time zone: UTC+3 (TRT)

Ağaşenliği (Kurdish: Şenyaxu) is a village in the Pülümür District, Tunceli Province, Turkey. The village is populated by Kurds of the Çarekan tribe and had a population of 13 in 2021.

The hamlets of Biçim, Binbaşak, Çağlan, Dereler, Koçpınar, Kümeli and Odabaşı are attached to the village.
