= Gölovası, Yumurtalık =

Gölovası
- Neighbourhood
- Location in Turkey
- Coordinates: 36°53′N 35°54′E
- Country: Turkey
- Province: Adana
- District: Yumurtalık
- Population (2022): 589
- Time zone: UTC+3 (TRT)

Gölovası is a neighbourhood in the municipality and district of Yumurtalık, Adana Province, Turkey. Its population is 589 (2022).
