= Çığlıca, Beytüşşebap =

Village in Şırnak Province, Turkey

Çığlıca
- Village
- Location within Turkey
- Coordinates: 37.619°N 43.137°E
- Country: Turkey
- Province: Şırnak
- District: Beytüşşebap
- Population (2023): 496
- Time zone: UTC+3 (TRT)

Çığlıca (Kurdish: Karçana) is a village in the Beytüşşebap District of Şırnak Province in Turkey. The village is populated by Kurds of the Mamxûran tribe and had a population of 496 in 2023.

The five hamlets of Baklan, Emekli, Eşme, Kayabaşı and Yoğurtlu (Surik) are attached to Çığlıca.

== Population ==
Population history from 2007 to 2023:

Population
Year	Pop.	±%
2007	594	—
2010	605	+1.9%
2015	509	−15.9%
2020	555	+9.0%
2023	496	−10.6%
