= Cevizağacı, Beytüşşebap =

Village in Şırnak Province, Turkey

Cevizağacı
- Village
- Location within Turkey
- Coordinates: 37.601°N 43.106°E
- Country: Turkey
- Province: Şırnak
- District: Beytüşşebap
- Population (2023): 79
- Time zone: UTC+3 (TRT)

Cevizağacı (Classical Syriac: ܓܙܐ ܕܢܘܚ, romanized: Gazzā d-Noḥ, lit. 'Noah's Treasure', Syriac: Gaznakh, Kurdish: Geznex) is a village in the Beytüşşebap District of Şırnak Province in Turkey. As of 2023, the village is inhabited by 79 Chaldean Catholics.

Cevizağacı is situated at the foot of the Kato mountain.

== History ==
The village was populated by Chaldean Catholics but abandoned by the 1990s when the whole population bar, the muhtar migrated to Belgium. Three families had by the early 2010s resettled in the village. In 2019, it was reported that eight families had returned to the village.

In August 2022, Mamxûran Kurds from neighboring villages returned land in the village to the returning Chaldean Catholics peacefully after having seized the land after its abandonment.

== Population ==
Population history from 2007 to 2023:

Population
Year	Pop.	±%
2007	23	—
2010	42	+82.6%
2015	69	+64.3%
2020	76	+10.1%
2023	79	+3.9%
