= Beytüşşebap =

- Municipality
- Location within Turkey
- Coordinates: 37.570°N 43.165°E
- Country: Turkey
- Province: Şırnak
- District: Beytüşşebap

Government
  - Mayor: Kamil Durmuş (AK party)
- Population (2023): 6,367
- Time zone: UTC+3 (TRT)

Beytüşşebap (Kurdish: Elkî) is a town and seat of Beytüşşebap District of Şırnak Province in Turkey. The town had a population of 6,367 in 2023. It is populated by Kurds of the Ertoşî, Geravî, Jirkî, Mamxûran and Pinyanîşî Kurdish tribes.

The mayor is Habip Aşan of the Justice and Development Party (AKP) and District Governor (Kaymakam), Hasan Meşel serves since September 2020 after he was appointed by Recep Tayyip Erdoğan.

== Neighborhoods ==
Beytüşşebap is divided into the neighborhoods of Ali Çavuş, Elki, Karşıyaka and Pınarbaşı.

== Population ==
Population history from 2007 to 2023:

Population
Year	Pop.	±%
2007	6,622	—
2010	5,231	−21.0%
2015	5,248	+0.3%
2020	5,690	+8.4%
2023	6,367	+11.9%

== Beytüşşebap rebellion ==
- See Beytussebab rebellion
