= Mezraa, Beytüşşebap =

Village in Şırnak Province, Turkey

Mezraa
- Village
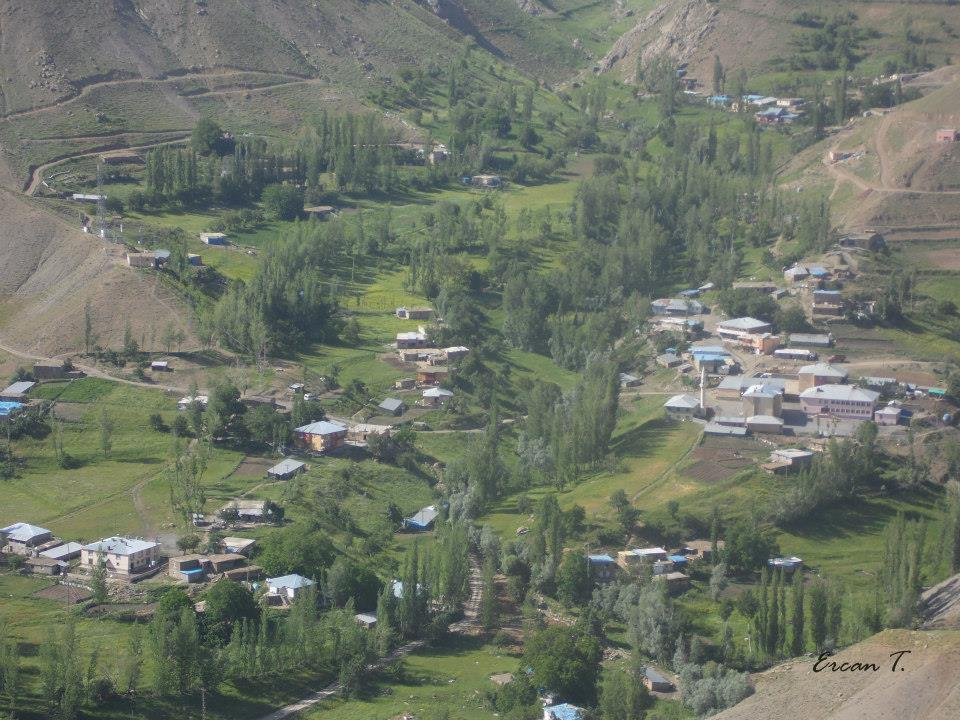
- Mezraa village

- Location within Turkey
- Coordinates: 37.654°N 43.187°E
- Country: Turkey
- Province: Şırnak
- District: Beytüşşebap
- Population (2023): 625
- Time zone: UTC+3 (TRT)

Mezraa (Kurdish: Mezra) is a village in the Beytüşşebap District of Şırnak Province in Turkey. The village is populated by Kurds of the Mamxûran tribe and had a population of 625 in 2023. Before the 2013 reorganisation, it was a town (belde).

== Population ==
Population history from 2007 to 2023:

Population
Year	Pop.	±%
2015	1,452	—
2020	1,017	−30.0%
2023	625	−38.5%
