= Mezraa, Pülümür =

Village in Tunceli Province, Turkey

Mezraa
- Village
- Location within Turkey
- Coordinates: 39.3882°N 39.8062°E
- Country: Turkey
- Province: Tunceli
- District: Pülümür
- Population (2021): 110
- Time zone: UTC+3 (TRT)

Mezraa (Kurdish: Mezra) is a village in the Pülümür District, Tunceli Province, Turkey. The village is populated by Kurds of the Arel tribe and had a population of 110 in 2021.

The hamlets of Akbal, Ballıca, Beğendik, Çatalyaka, Çoban, Danacı, Göbegöbe, Göl, Kadısırtı, Kanatlı, Meşegurt, Mezar, Oymaklı, Salördek, Samanlık, Seyitler, Uzunevler, Ünveren and Yeşilöz are attached to the village.
