= Mutluca, Beytüşşebap =

Village in Şırnak Province, Turkey

Mutlu
- Village
- Location within Turkey
- Coordinates: 37.481°N 43.069°E
- Country: Turkey
- Province: Şırnak
- District: Beytüşşebap
- Population (2023): 559
- Time zone: UTC+3 (TRT)

Mutluca (Kurdish: Kespiyanîş) is a village in the Beytüşşebap District of Şırnak Province in Turkey. The village is populated by Kurds of the Jirkî tribe and had a population of 559 in 2023.

== Population ==
Population history from 2007 to 2023:

Population
Year	Pop.	±%
2007	470	—
2010	526	+11.9%
2015	569	+8.2%
2020	566	−0.5%
2023	559	−1.2%
