= Ayvalık, Beytüşşebap =

Village in Şırnak Province, Turkey

Ayvalık
- Village
- Location within Turkey
- Coordinates: 37.482°N 43.114°E
- Country: Turkey
- Province: Şırnak
- District: Beytüşşebap
- Population (2023): 665
- Time zone: UTC+3 (TRT)

Ayvalık (Kurdish: Balekî) is a village in the Beytüşşebap District of Şırnak Province in Turkey. The village is populated by Kurds of the Jirkî tribe and had a population of 665 in 2023.

== Population ==
Population history from 2007 to 2023:

Population
Year	Pop.	±%
2007	867	—
2010	852	−1.7%
2015	1,122	+31.7%
2020	822	−26.7%
2023	665	−19.1%
