= Ayvalık, Yumurtalık =

Ayvalık
- Neighbourhood
- Location in Turkey
- Coordinates: 36.79602°N 35.68744°E
- Country: Turkey
- Province: Adana
- District: Yumurtalık
- Population (2022): 457
- Time zone: UTC+3 (TRT)

Ayvalık is a neighbourhood in the municipality and district of Yumurtalık, Adana Province, Turkey. Its population is 457 (2022).
