= Cemal Basaran =

Professor of engineering

- Born: Cemalettin Basaran; April 20, 1960 (age 66)
- Education: Yıldız Technical University, Middle East Technical University, Massachusetts Institute of Technology, University of Arizona
- Occupations: Professor of engineering mechanics, University at Buffalo

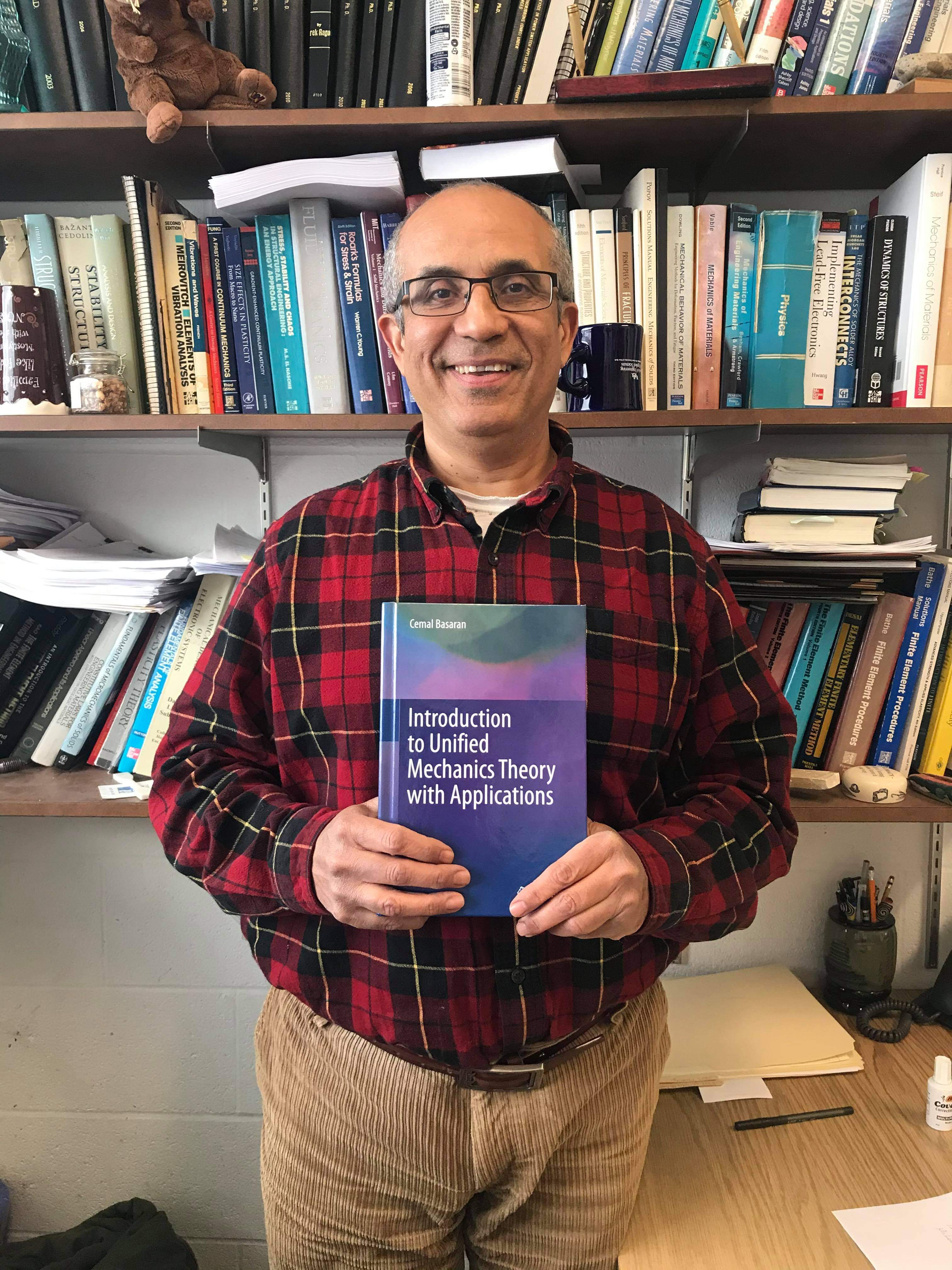
Dr. Basaran in his office at University at Buffalo

Cemalettin Basaran (born April 20, 1960) is a Turkish-born American engineer who is currently a professor in the department of civil, structural and environmental engineering at the University at Buffalo, State University of New York.

== Research ==
Basaran's research is in the field of theoretical and applied mechanics, concentrating on failure mechanics of electronic packaging materials, 2-dimensional nano materials, and particle-filled composite materials under electrical, thermal and mechanical loads. Basaran was co-inventor of the electrostatic doping-based all-graphene nano ribbon tunnel field effect transistor, US patent number 10,593,7782.

== Honors and awards ==
Basaran in 2011 received the American Society of Mechanical Engineers Electronic & Photonic Packaging Division Excellence in Mechanics Award. In 2008 Basaran was elected to be a fellow of that same society. Basaran is the recipient of the US Navy Office of Naval Research Young Investigator Award, 1997 and Riefler Award, from the University at Buffalo, School of Engineering and Applied Sciences in 1997. Author, Introduction to Unified Mechanics Theory with Applications, second edition, 2023, Springer.
