= Beytüşşebap District =

District in Şırnak Province, Turkey

- District
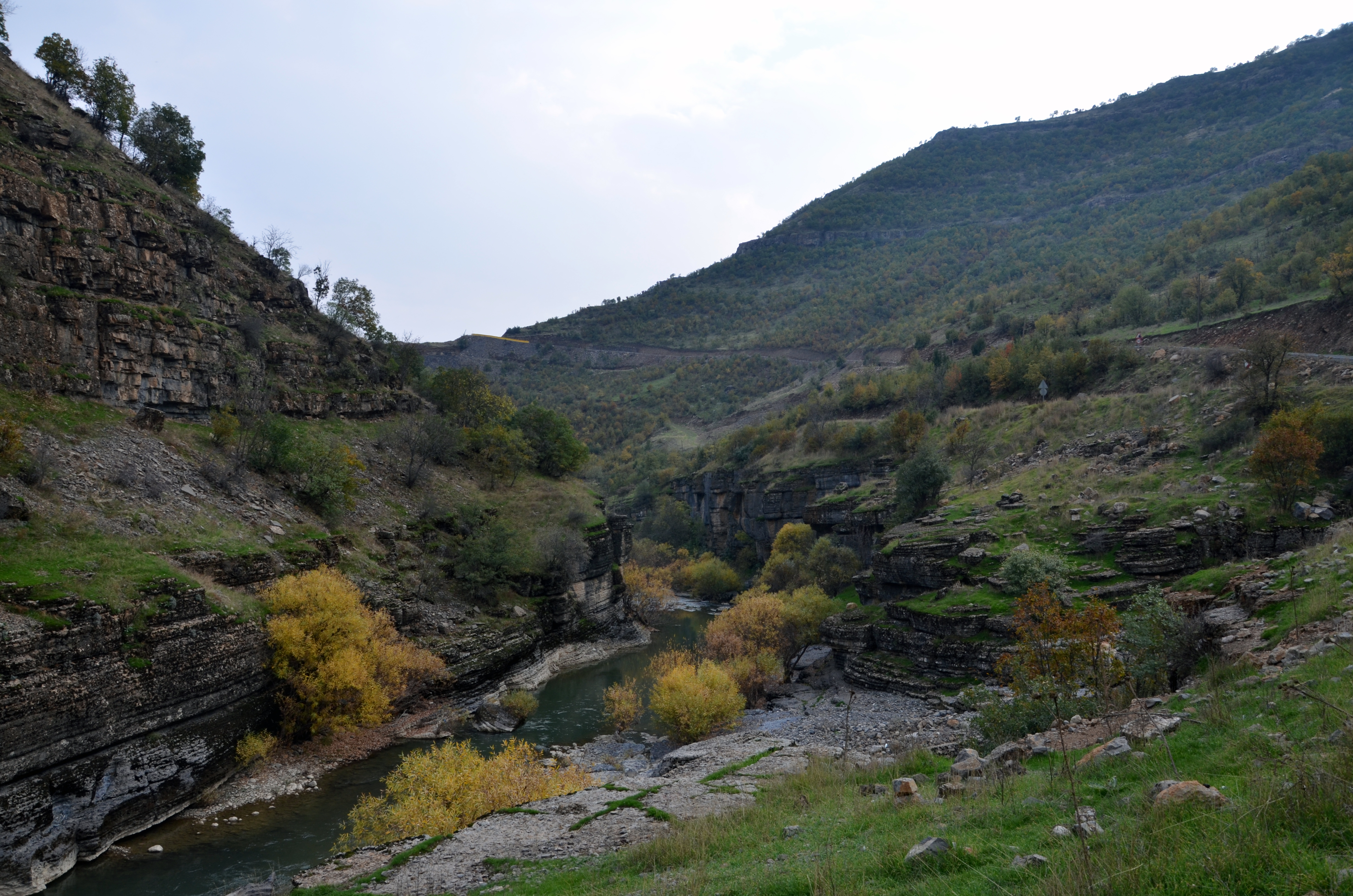

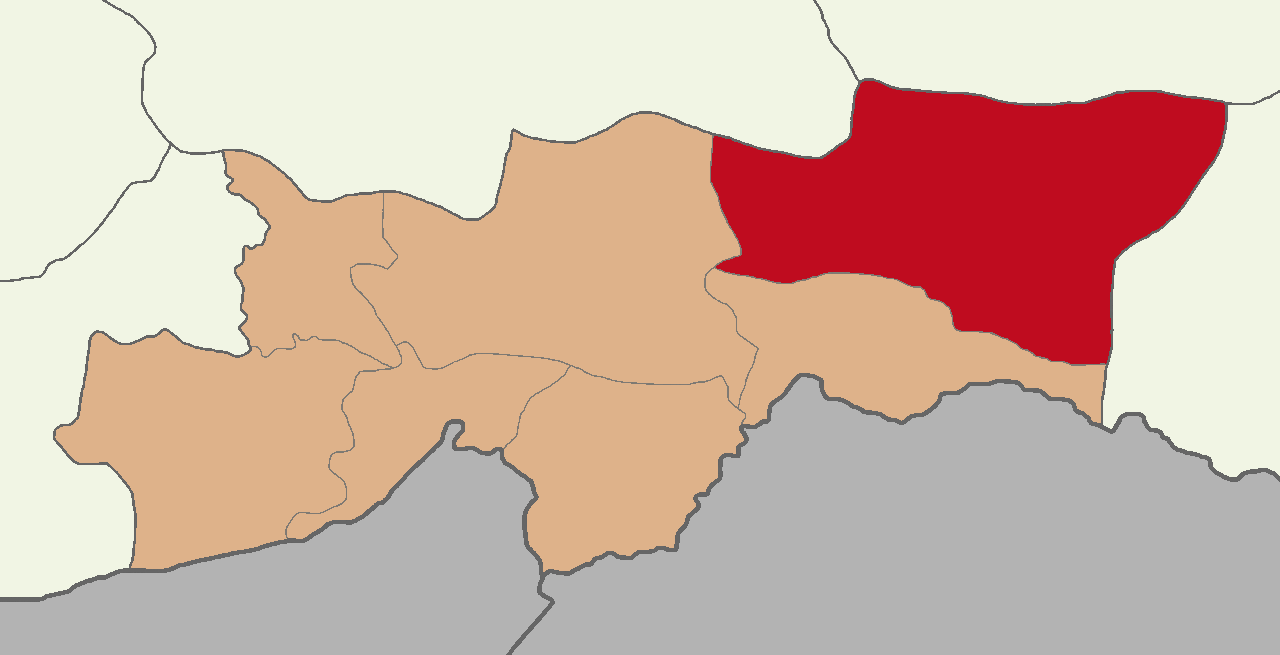
- Map showing Beytüşşebap District in Şırnak Province

- Location within Turkey
- Coordinates: 37°36′N 43°06′E
- Country: Turkey
- Province: Şırnak
- Seat: Beytüşşebap
- Area: 1,647 km^{2} (636 sq mi)
- Population (2023): 16,056
  - Density: 9.749/km^{2} (25.25/sq mi)
- Time zone: UTC+3 (TRT)

Beytüşşebap District is a district of the Şırnak Province of Turkey. In 2023, the district had a population of 16,056. The seat of the district is the town of Beytüşşebap. Its area is 1,647 km^{2}.

== Settlements ==
Beytüşşebap District contains no beldes, thirty-one villages of which five are unpopulated and moreover fifty-five hamlets.

=== Villages ===
1. Akarsu (Tanga Xana)
2. Akçayol (Şekalwa)
3. Aşağıdere (Kelê jerê)
4. Ayvalık (Balekî)
5. Başaran (Çeman)
6. Beşağaç (Hemka)
7. Boğazören (Kitêr)
8. Bolağaç (Bîşî)
9. Bölücek (Pîrosa)
10. Cevizağacı (Geznex)
11. Çığlıca (Karçana)
12. Dağaltı (Tivor)
13. Dilekyolu (Pertevin)
14. Doğanyol (Pîrdoda)
15. Dönmezler
16. Gökçe (Ewrek)
17. Güneyyaka (Batê)
18. Günyüzü (Mesele)
19. Ilıcak (Germav)
20. Kovankaya (Meer)
21. Koyunoba (Tanga Xana)
22. Mezraa (Mezra)
23. Mutluca (Kespiyanîş)
24. Ortalı (Bêzal)
25. Oymakaya (Dûhlê)
26. Pirinçli (Çemê Heskî)
27. Söğütce (Govik)
28. Toptepe (Kaçet)
29. Tuzluca (Meydan Kolya)
30. Yenice
31. Yeşilöz (Feraşîna jorê)

== Population ==
Population history from 2007 to 2023:

Population
Year	Pop.	±%
2007	19,947	—
2010	17,537	−12.1%
2015	17,100	−2.5%
2020	16,317	−4.6%
2023	16,056	−1.6%
