= Başaran, Beytüşşebap =

Village in Şırnak Province, Turkey

Başaran
- Village
- Location within Turkey
- Coordinates: 37.477°N 43.129°E
- Country: Turkey
- Province: Şırnak
- District: Beytüşşebap
- Population (2023): 682
- Time zone: UTC+3 (TRT)

Başaran (Kurdish: Çeman) is a village in the Beytüşşebap District of Şırnak Province in Turkey. The village is populated by Kurds of the Jirkî tribe and had a population of 682 in 2023.

The hamlets of Akağıl, Bademli and Tepebaşı is attached to Başaran.

== Population ==
Population history from 2007 to 2023:

Population
| Year | Pop. | ±% |
|---|---|---|
| 2007 | 721 | — |
| 2010 | 723 | +0.3% |
| 2015 | 739 | +2.2% |
| 2020 | 695 | −6.0% |
| 2023 | 682 | −1.9% |
