= Korhan Başaran =

Turkish modern dancer and choreographer

Korhan Başaran is a Turkish-born modern dancer and choreographer who has worked extensively in New York City.

== Career ==
Basaran started out as an actor in Turkey.

Basaran started his career working with Binnaz Dorkip, choreographer of the State Opera and Ballet, and started dancing in the MDT - Modern Dance Turkey under the direction of Beyhan Murphy. He also danced with the Zeynep Tanbay Dance Project and performed another leading role in the production "Night of the Sultans" of Marcel Avram. He premiered his own project "The Loving" by the beginning of 2008, consisting of duets he has choreographed in time. He received favourable reviews for his leading role performance in the "Hurrem Sultan Dance Project", "the executioner".

He won a place on a scholarship program to Merce Cunningham's school in New York, and worked with over 200 dancers in the city.

In 2018 he was working in Istanbul (kept out of the US by the Trump travel ban) with dancers from Istanbul, New York, and Boston (Prometheus Dance), on his project about refugees entitled RAu.

== Choreographic works ==
- Elegy, 2008, Music: H.Purcell, Text: Blaise Cendrars
- Bach’s and Sins, Work in Progress.. 2008 Music: J.S. Bach, A. Schnittke
- A Dialogue for One, 2007, Elected to compete in the semi-finals the 2009 International Choreographic Competition Hannover
- Kaotika (The Chaotic Land), 2007, Music: M. Galosso
- Su Gibi (Cool Impulse), 2007, Music: H.Purcell
- Arlecchino, 2007, Music: J.Dowland
- Mahrem (Intimate), 2006, Music: J.S.Bach, M.Marais
- Askmak (The Loving), 2005,
- Music: A.Vivaldi, M.Marais
- Tango Reflections, 2005, Music: A.Piazzola / in collaboration with Mehmet Okonsar
- Yedi (Seven), 2004, Music: J.S.Bach
