= Beth Sanner =

American government official

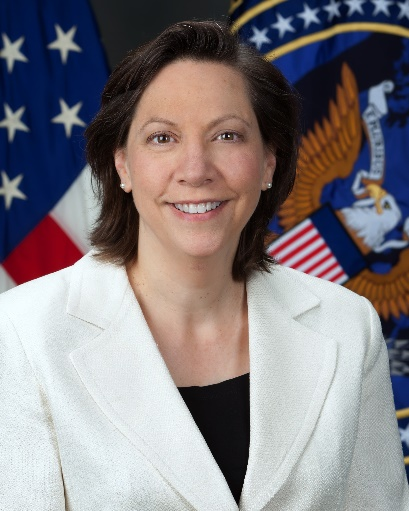

Deputy Director of National Intelligence for Mission Integration
- In office April 2019 – March 2021
- President: Donald Trump; Joe Biden
- Preceded by: Edward Gistaro
- Succeeded by: Morgan Muir

Director of the President's Daily Brief
- In office April 2017 – April 2019
- President: Donald Trump

Vice-Chair of the National Intelligence Council
- In office July 2015 – April 2017
- President: Barack Obama; Donald Trump

Personal details
- Education: American University (BA); National War College (MS)

Beth Sanner is an American former intelligence officer. A career analyst at the Central Intelligence Agency (CIA), she was the deputy director of National Intelligence for Mission Integration from 2019 to 2021 and the intelligence briefer to President Donald Trump from 2017 until the end of his first term. Her briefings drew public attention in 2020, when the White House cited them in disputes over what Trump had been told about the coronavirus and about the Russian bounty program. Since leaving government she has been a national security contributor for CNN.

== Education ==
Sanner is a distinguished graduate of the National War College, earning a Master of Science in national security strategy. She has a B.A. in economics and international affairs from American University.

== Career ==
=== Central Intelligence Agency ===
Sanner held several senior leadership positions in CIA's Directorate of Analysis, including leading the analytic effort on South Asia and serving as the deputy for analysis for Russian and European affairs. She also held analytic leadership roles for the Balkans, Central Europe, and Southeast Asia. Sanner was the Director of the Career Analyst Program, the training program for all new CIA analysts.

Sanner has also served in a wide range of leadership, staff, policy, and analytic positions in the Office of the Director of National Intelligence, the Central Intelligence Agency, the National Security Council, and the U.S. Department of State.

=== Office of the Director of National Intelligence ===
Sanner assumed leadership for the President's Daily Brief in April 2017. Previously she served as the vice chair of the National Intelligence Council. From then on she was Trump's lead intelligence briefer, a CIA officer detailed to the Office of the Director of National Intelligence (ODNI). In 2019 she became deputy director of National Intelligence for Mission Integration, a post that combines the briefer's job with coordinating the work of the 18 intelligence agencies.

In 2020 the White House twice pointed to her briefings. Criticized for his response to the coronavirus, Trump said that his first intelligence briefing on the virus, on January 23, had described it as "not a big deal". A White House official told NPR that Trump was briefed on January 23 and January 28, and that the first briefing said the virus could spread globally but was not deadly for most people. In June, after reports that intelligence about Russian bounties for the killing of American troops in Afghanistan had been included in the President's Daily Brief, the national security adviser, Robert C. O'Brien, said that the president's "career CIA briefer" had decided not to brief him orally because the intelligence was unverified. He called her "an outstanding officer". Current and former officials told NBC News that the briefer did not make such decisions alone, because the CIA director and the director of National Intelligence usually attended the briefings. Sources told Fox News that the briefer could not remove an item from the brief without approval from a more senior official. NPR wrote that the president's briefer is normally not identified in public. Days later Sanner gave rare public remarks at an online event of the Intelligence and National Security Alliance, describing how she adapts a briefing to the "customer" without mentioning Trump by name.

The New York Times reported in January 2021 that Sanner had briefed Trump twice a week until the final months before the 2020 election, when he turned more often to the director of National Intelligence, John Ratcliffe, and that her defenders said she answered his questions honestly even when he would not like the answer. After Joe Biden took office, the new director, Avril Haines, chose Morgan Muir, a CIA analyst who had briefed George W. Bush, to replace her as the president's briefer. An ODNI spokesperson said Sanner would complete her tour in May 2021.

== After government ==
Sanner became a national security contributor for CNN after leaving government. She is a resident distinguished fellow at the German Marshall Fund and, since January 2022, a senior fellow of the Intelligence Project at Harvard's Belfer Center for Science and International Affairs. In August 2025 the director of National Intelligence, Tulsi Gabbard, revoked the security clearances of 37 current and former officials, among them Sanner. The memo accused those listed, without citing evidence, of politicizing or leaking intelligence.
