= Carrie Lukas =

American writer (born 1973)

Carrie L. Lukas
- Born: Carolyn Eileen Lips; 1973 (age 52–53)
- Education: Princeton University (AB); Harvard University (MPP)
- Occupation: President of the Independent Women's Forum (IWF)
- Known for: conservative commentary
- Spouse: Aaron Lukas (m. 2003)
- Children: 5
- Website: https://www.iwvoice.com/people/carrie-l-lukas/

Carrie L. Lukas (born 1973) is president of the conservative leaning non-profit Independent Women's Forum (IWF).

Prior to joining IWF, Lukas worked in the U.S. House of Representatives for U.S. House of Representative Christopher Cox as senior domestic policy analyst for the House Republican Policy Committee and a senior staff member of the U.S. House Homeland Security Committee.

== Education ==
Lukas earned her B.A. from Princeton University and her master's degree in public policy from Harvard Kennedy School at Harvard University.

== Career ==
She worked at the Cato Institute as a social security analyst, where she authored several studies on social security and education policies. Her op-ed pieces have been published in, among other publications, The Washington Post, The Wall Street Journal, The New York Post, The New York Times, and USA Today. She is author of the books The Politically Incorrect Guide to Women, Sex, and Feminism and Liberty is No War on Women.

== Political positions ==
Lukas believes that minimum wage laws adversely affect the young and those with low skill levels. She has argued that there are two sexes, and that individuals are born either as men or women. And she has argued against board quotas, saying that are a distraction to workplace equality and may undo women’s historic gains by suggesting that we cannot succeed on our own.

== Books ==
1. Lukas, Carrie L. (January 1, 2006). The Politically Incorrect Guide to Women, Sex, and Feminism. Washington, D.C.: Regnery Publishing. ISBN 978-1596980037.
2. Lukas, Carrie L. (September 1, 2012). Liberty Is No War on Women. New York, NY: Encounter Broadsides. ISBN 978-1479180455.
3. Lukas, Carrie L. (July 23, 2019). Checking Progressive Privilege. New York, NY: Encounter Broadsides. ISBN 978-1641770866.

== Personal ==
Lukas met her husband, Aaron Lukas, while working with him at the Cato Institute. He was tapped to serve as acting Director of National Intelligence with the departure of Tulsi Gabbard. They married in 2003 and are raising five children together in Virginia.
