= Laura Galante =

American intelligence official

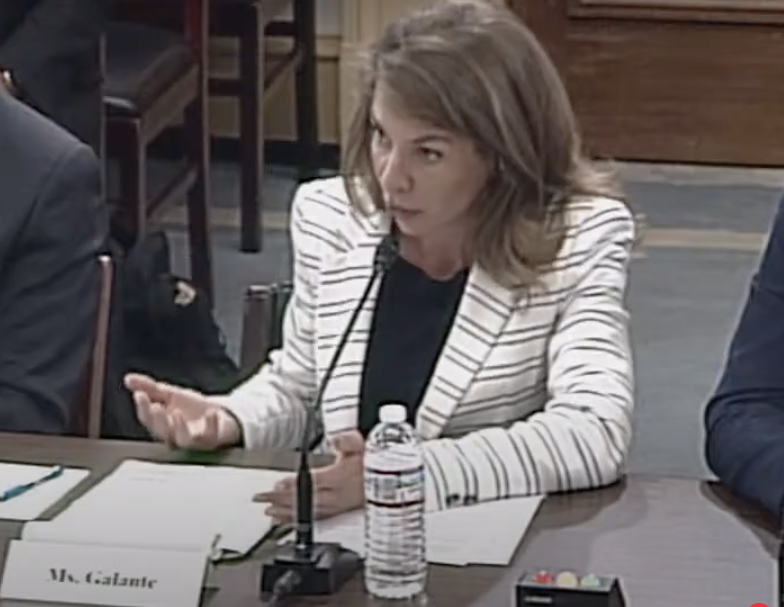
- Galante testifying in April 2025

Director, Cyber Threat Intelligence Integration Center, Office of the Director of National Intelligence
- In office May 22, 2022 – January 17, 2025
- President: Joe Biden
- Leader: Avril Haines
- Preceded by: Tom Donahue

Personal details
- Born: Chicago, IL
- Education: University of Virginia (BA); Catholic University of America (JD)

Laura Galante (born 1985) is an American intelligence official and cybersecurity executive. She is a Principal at the global strategic advisory firm, WestExec Advisors and serves on a number of national security and cybersecurity companies' boards. From 2022 to 2025, she served as the Director of the Cyber Threat Intelligence Integration Center (CTIIC) and the Intelligence Community’s Cyber Executive at the Office of the Director of National Intelligence (ODNI). Prior to this role, Galante led multiple security initiatives in Ukraine and previously served as the Director of Global Intelligence at Mandiant (formerly FireEye).

== Early life and education ==
Galante grew up in Northern Virginia and was an active member of 4-H, winning the 4-H National Livestock Skill-A-thon in 2000. She graduated from Robinson Secondary School in 2003 and during high school served two terms as the president of the Fairfax County 4-H Fair Board. She received her BA in Foreign Affairs and Italian from the University of Virginia and a JD from the Catholic University of America.

== Career ==
Galante served in intelligence analysis roles at the Department of State and the Defense Intelligence Agency where she was a Booz Allen Hamilton contractor leading a strategic cyber threat analysis team.

In 2012, she joined cybersecurity and incident response firm, Mandiant. In 2014 Mandiant was acquired by FireEye and Galante held leadership positions across the company’s threat intelligence business and directed a number of public reports attributing nation state hacking operations including Moscow-sponsored, APT28. She served as the Director of Global Intelligence at FireEye until her departure in March 2017 and subsequently established a consulting practice, Galante Strategies LLC. At TED2017, Galante gave a talk titled, “How (and why) Russia Hacked the US Election.”

Through her consultancy, Galante led cybersecurity programs for USAID in Ukraine and the Ukraine Election Task Force. She also served as an expert witness who attributed the NotPetya cyber attack on multinational businesses in Ukraine to Russia’s GRU.

In 2019, Galante ran for the 18th District seat in Virginia’s House of Delegates. She won the Democratic primary and lost the general election to the Republican incumbent, Micheal Webert.

In May 2022, Galante was tapped as the Director of the Cyber Threat Intelligence Integration Center, reporting to the Director of National Intelligence. She served concurrently as the Intelligence Community’ Cyber Executive. Under Galante’s leadership, CTIIC has focused on further integrating commercial intelligence in the IC and bolstering public-private partnerships.

In 2024, CTIIC released multiple unclassified intelligence products detailing ransomware attacks on US and global entities and other successful cyber operations against US critical infrastructure sectors. Galante has spoken frequently about the evolution of the Intelligence Community’s commercial cyber partnership model and its role in securing US critical infrastructure.

In 2025, Galante joined WestExec Advisors as a Principal. She serves on the advisory board of Billington Cybersecurity and as a member of the Principals Committee for The Cipher Brief's Cyber Initiatives Group

Galante testified about Chinese cyber operations to the House Select Committee on the Chinese Communist Party and in April 2025 at the House Committee Hearing on "Global Networks at Risk: Securing the Future of Telecommunications Infrastructure."

Galante is a frequent keynote speaker on geopolitical threats to digital infrastructure and is represented by The Lavin Agency and A-Speakers.
