= Cyber Threat Intelligence Integration Center =

United States Cyber Threat Intelligence Integration Center
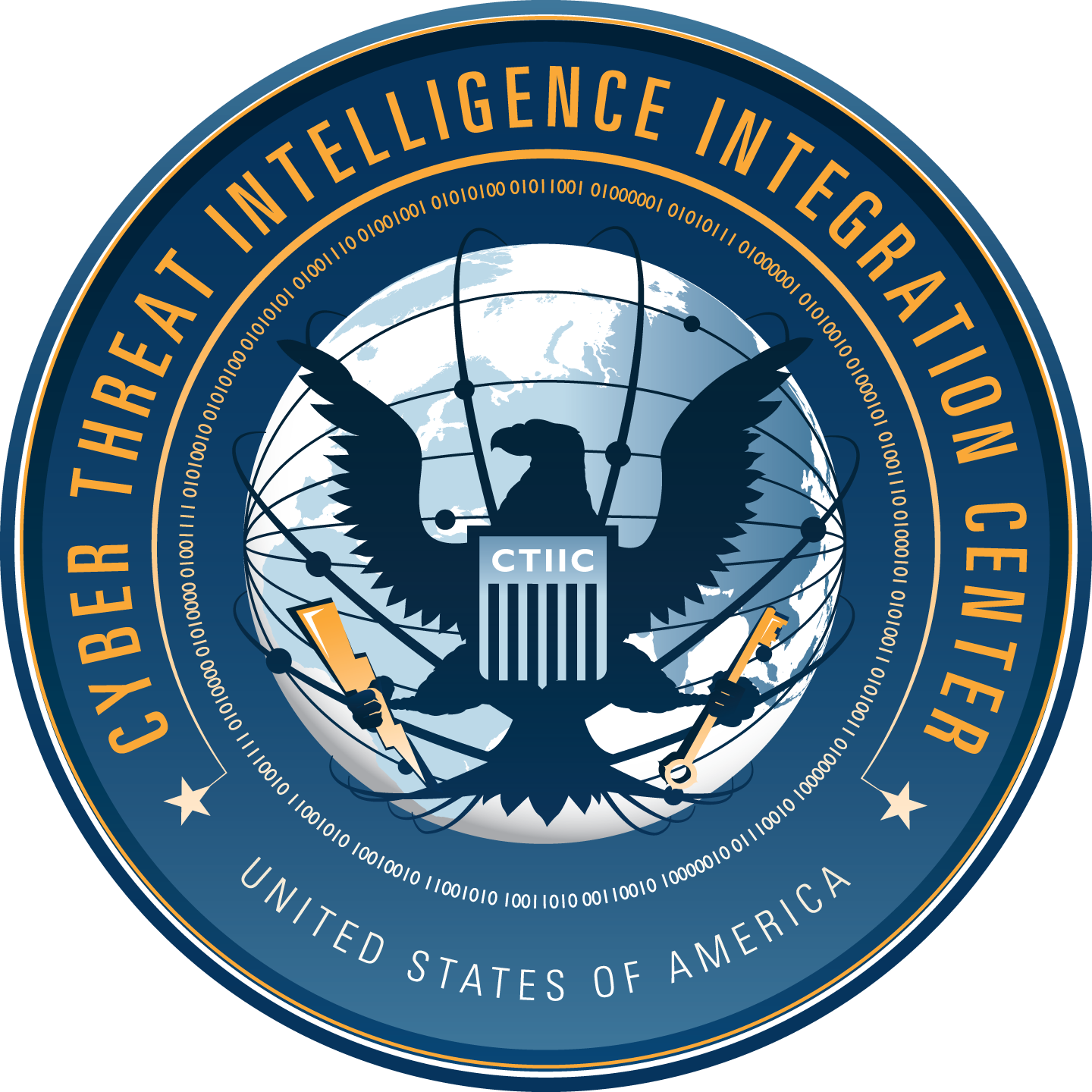
- CTIIC Seal

Agency overview
- Formed: February 10, 2015; 11 years ago
- Jurisdiction: United States
- Parent agency: Office of the Director of National Intelligence
- Website: https://www.dni.gov/index.php/ctiic-home

The Cyber Threat Intelligence Integration Center (CTIIC) is a United States federal government agency that operates as a fusion center between intelligence agencies and the private sector for real-time use against cyber attacks. CTIIC was created in the wake of the 2014 cyber attack on Sony in combination with the need to establish a cyber integration center following blocked efforts in Congress that were stymied over liability and privacy concerns of citizens. In August 2025, Tulsi Gabbard announced plans to dissolve CTIIC.

== History ==
CTIIC was formally announced by Lisa Monaco on February 10, 2015, at the Wilson Center. The agency is within the Office of the Director of National Intelligence. The agency's seal incorporates binary code that, when decoded, reads "AWARENESS ANALYSIS OPPORTUNITY" (originally encoded without spaces).

The Director of CTIIC reports to the DNI, serves as the Intelligence Community Cyber Executive and is the DNI's principal advisor on cyber threats. The Center comprises the Office of the National Intelligence Manager for Cyber, the Office of Strategic Cyber Partnerships, and the Office for Analytic Integration. CTIIC's analysis on ransomware serves as the intelligence update for the International Counter Ransomware Initiative and was recognized at the inaugural Cyber Policy Awards sponsored by the Institute for Security and Technology.

Director of National Intelligence Avril Haines sought to revitalize CTIIC through its role in coordinating intelligence collection, analysis, and partnerships with the private sector.

The Congressional 2020 Cyber Solarium Commission Report noted the need for improving public and private sector cyber defense efforts and included a recommendation to "Codify and Strengthen the Cyber Threat Intelligence Integration Center." In its 2024 progress report, the Commission noted that its recommendations for CTIIC had been fully implemented and "With increased budget and manpower, CTIIC will play a critical role in integrating and disseminating cyber threat intelligence across federal agencies and supporting the director of national intelligence as the federal lead for intelligence support, as named in NSM-22. CTIIC will also play a lead role as a federal integrator in cyber open-source intelligence collaboration."

In 2024, the National Security Memorandum on Critical Infrastructure Security and Resilience stated that "In the event of significant cyber incidents involving critical infrastructure, the DNI, acting through the Director of the Cyber Threat Intelligence Integration Center, shall carry out its responsibilities as the Federal lead agency for intelligence support and related activities under PPD-41." As such, ODNI's CTIIC, along with CISA and the FBI, serve as the lead agencies for coordinating national incident response to cyber incidents through the Cyber Unified Coordination Group.

In August 2025, Tulsi Gabbard announced plans to dissolve CTIIC.

== Directors ==
- Tonya Ugoretz (January 7, 2016 - March 13, 2019)
- Erin Joe (March 13, 2019 – July 2021)
- Tom Donahue (2021 - 2022)
- Laura Galante (May 2022 - April 2025)

== See also ==
- Cyber Intelligence Sharing and Protection Act
- Cyber threat intelligence
- Department of Homeland Security
- Intelligence Reform and Terrorism Prevention Act
