= Deputy Director of National Intelligence =

- Seal of the Office of the Director of National Intelligence

- Flag of the Office of the Director of National Intelligence
- Office of the Director of National Intelligence
- Reports to: Director of National Intelligence
- Seat: Washington, D.C.
- Appointer: The president; with advice and consent of the Senate
- Term length: No fixed term
- Constituting instrument: 50 U.S.C. § 3023
- Formation: December 17, 2004 (21 years ago)
- Salary: Executive Schedule, Level II
- Website: odni.gov

The deputy director of national intelligence is a position in the Office of the Director of National Intelligence.

== History ==
The position of the director of national intelligence was formally established by the signing of the Intelligence Reform and Terrorism Prevention Act on December 17, 2004. The bill additionally created the Office of the Director of National Intelligence to support the director. In February 2005, President George W. Bush named Michael Hayden, the director of the National Security Agency, as the first principal deputy director of national intelligence. Hayden was sworn into office in April.

== List of principal deputy directors of national intelligence ==
Parties

Democratic Republican Independent

Status

Denotes acting principal deputy director of national intelligence

No.	Portrait	Principal deputy director	Took office	Left office	President
1		Michael Hayden	April 21, 2005	May 30, 2006	George W. Bush (2001–2009)
–		Ronald L. Burgess Jr.	June 6, 2006	May 30, 2006	George W. Bush (2001–2009)
2		Donald Kerr	October 5, 2006	May 30, 2009	George W. Bush (2001–2009)
–		Ronald L. Burgess Jr.	January 20, 2009	March 18, 2009	Barack Obama (2009–2017)
3		David Gompert	November 10, 2009	February 11, 2011	Barack Obama (2009–2017)
4		Stephanie O'Sullivan	February 18, 2011	January 20, 2017	Barack Obama (2009–2017)
5		Susan M. Gordon	August 7, 2017	August 15, 2019	Donald Trump (2017–2021)
–		Kash Patel	February 20, 2020	May 26, 2020	Donald Trump (2017–2021)
6		Stacey Dixon	August 4, 2021	January 25, 2025	Joe Biden (2021–2025)
7		Aaron Lukas	July 24, 2025	present	Donald Trump (2025–present)

== List of deputy directors of national intelligence ==
=== Mission integration ===
- Ted Gistaro (2017–2019)
- Beth Sanner (2019–2021)
- William P. Ruger (2025–2026)
- Trent Maul (2026–present)

=== Policy and capabilities ===
- Dustin J. Gard-Weiss (2020–2023)
- Charles Luftig (2023–2025)
- Amaryllis Fox Kennedy (2025–2026)
- Allison "Alli" Curran (2026–present)
