= Alabama Military Academy =

Coordinates: 33.724969°N 85.788242°W

- Country: United States
- Allegiance: United States; Alabama
- Garrison/HQ: Alabama
- Motto: "It shall be done"

The Alabama Military Academy is a National Guard officer candidate training school located at the Fort McClellan Army National Guard Training Center in Fort McClellan, Alabama. It was established in 1957 and has the motto "It shall be done." The training center celebrated Fort McClellan's 100th anniversary in 2017. Candidates participate in a six-mile march at Talladega Superspeedway.

== History ==
Located near the city of Anniston, Alabama, Camp McClellan was established by the War Department in July 1917, it was named after major general George B. McClellan. In August 1917, the 29th National Guard Division arrived under the command of major general Charles G. Morton. In July 1929, Camp McClellan became Fort McClellan. During World War II, more than 500,000 men trained at the fort. On 30 June 1947, the training center was placed on inactive status, and in 1950 the National Guard set out to use the area once again. General Theodore R. Wessels used $10 million in funding and completed restorations to the fort, earning him the name "Father of the New Fort McClellan".

The Alabama Military Academy was founded in 1957 by Col. Alton R. Barnes, who was a full time member of the Alabama National Guard and was its first commandant.

== Notable alumni ==
- Tulsi Gabbard, member of the United States House of Representatives from Hawaii; first woman to finish as the distinguished honor graduate in the academy's 50-year history.

== Controversy ==
On February 13, 2009, comedian Sacha Baron Cohen (in character as Brüno) fooled Guard officers into allowing him to participate in training at the Alabama Military Academy at Fort McClellan. The officers were led to believe that Cohen was a reporter making a German TV documentary. The incident ended when an Alabama cadet recognized Cohen. Guard spokesperson Staff Sergeant Katrina Timmons stated on March 16, 2009, about the incident, "It's an embarrassment to the Alabama National Guard. Since then we have put in protocols to make sure this doesn't happen again."
