= Erin Joe =

American executive

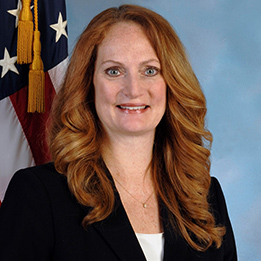

2nd Director of the Cyber Threat Intelligence Integration Center
- Incumbent
- Assumed office March 13, 2019
- President: Donald Trump
- Preceded by: Tonya Ugoretz (Q64413933)

Erin Joe is currently working for Mandiant/Google Cloud as their Senior Vice President of Strategy and Alliances.

Erin Joe was the 2nd director of the U.S. government's Cyber Threat Intelligence Integration Center.

Joe was previously a senior executive over cyber operations at the Federal Bureau of Investigation (FBI). She served as a special agent in the FBI for 22 years.
