= Office of the Director of National Intelligence =

Independent agency of the United States federal government

- Seal of the Office of the Director of National Intelligence

Agency overview
- Formed: December 17, 2004; 21 years ago
- Preceding agency: Central Intelligence Agency
- Employees: approx. 1,000 (2026)
- Agency executives: Jay Clayton, Director; Aaron Lukas, Principal Deputy Director
- Website: odni.gov

The Office of the Director of National Intelligence (ODNI) is an independent agency of the United States federal government responsible for coordinating domestic intelligence. Created after the September 11 attacks, the Office of the Director of National Intelligence was established by the Intelligence Reform and Terrorism Prevention Act in 2004. The agency primarily assists the director of national intelligence in their authorities, including leading the United States Intelligence Community, advising the president on national security affairs, and managing the National Intelligence Program.

== History ==
=== Initial suggestions (1991–2004) ===
In February 1991, Oklahoma senator David Boren and Alaska senator Frank Murkowski, the chair and ranking member of the Senate Select Committee on Intelligence respectively, proposed the establishment of a director of national intelligence. The director would coordinate intelligence operations outside of an organizational structure. Boren and Oklahoma representative Dave McCurdy, the chair of the House Permanent Select Committee on Intelligence, presented their plan again the following year. Their suggestion would have created a separate organization for intelligence analysis, a responsibility that had primarily been assumed by the Central Intelligence Agency. The reorganization encountered resistance from within George H. W. Bush administration and some lawmakers in Congress.

The proposal received renewed attention following the September 11 attacks. In June 2002, California senator Dianne Feinstein advocated for appointing a director of national intelligence. In October, former Indiana representative Lee Hamilton, who had previously led the House Committee on Foreign Affairs, testified before the Joint Inquiry into Intelligence Community Activities before and after the Terrorist Attacks of September 11, 2001. Hamilton recommended to Congress establishing the position of the director of national intelligence; Feinstein introduced legislation on the suggestion that day. The joint inquiry's final report in December called for establishing a cabinet-level director of national intelligence, taking from the authorities of the director of the Central Intelligence Agency.

The 9/11 Commission considered the establishment of a director of national intelligence as early as September 2003, suggesting that it could propose an "American version of Britain's MI-5. Some Democrats on the Commission on the Intelligence Capabilities of the United States Regarding Weapons of Mass Destruction renewed the suggestion in April 2004. That month, The New York Times reported that the George W. Bush administration was considering establishing a director of national intelligence on its own. By August, President George W. Bush; Massachusetts senator John Kerry, his rival in the 2004 presidential election; and three former directors of the Central Intelligence Agency had expressed support for establishing the position of the director of national intelligence.

=== Establishment and early work (2004–2010) ===
The position of the director of national intelligence was formally established by the signing of the Intelligence Reform and Terrorism Prevention Act on December 17, 2004. The bill additionally created the Office of the Director of National Intelligence to support the director.

== Organization and structure ==
=== Leadership ===
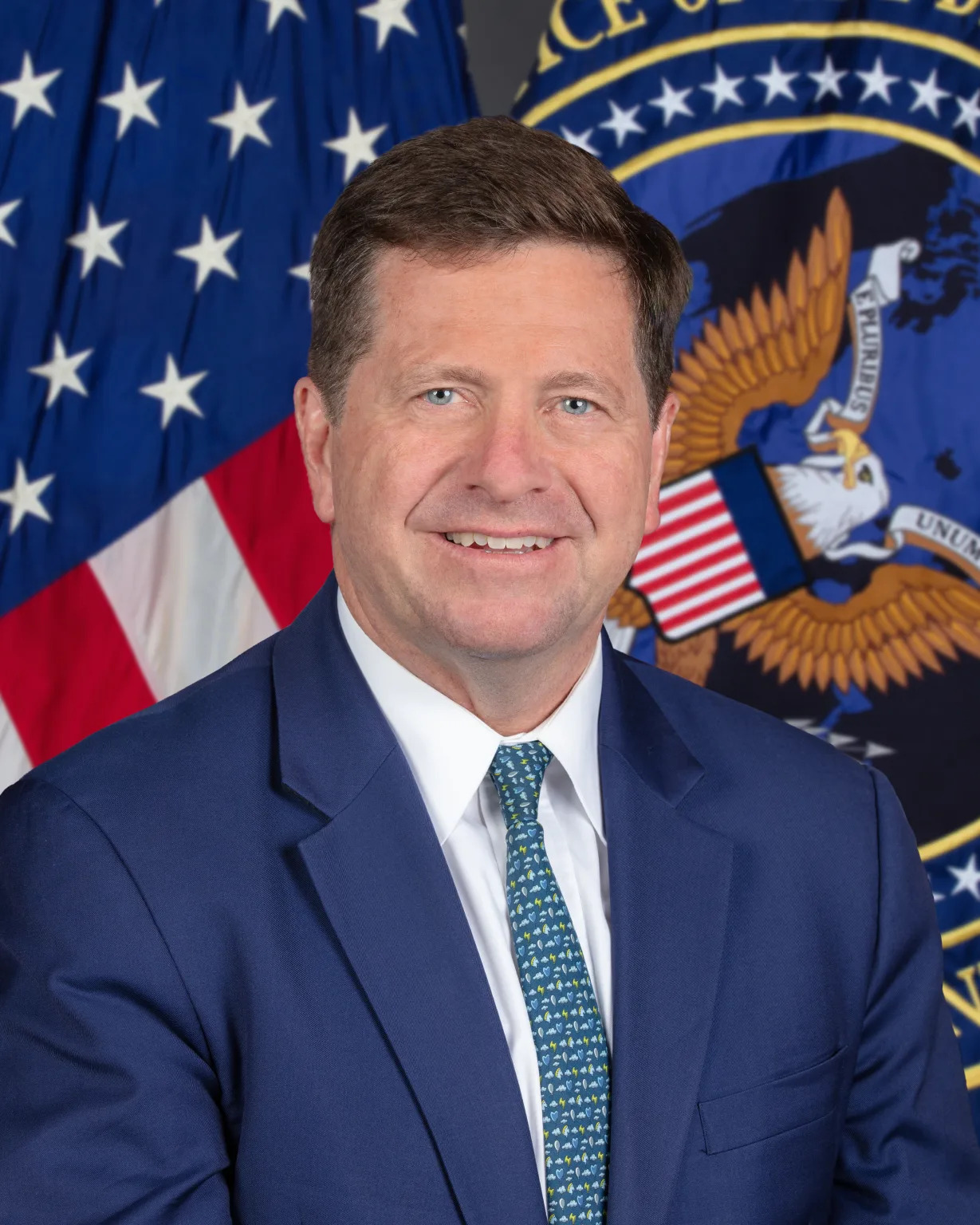
Director
Jay Clayton

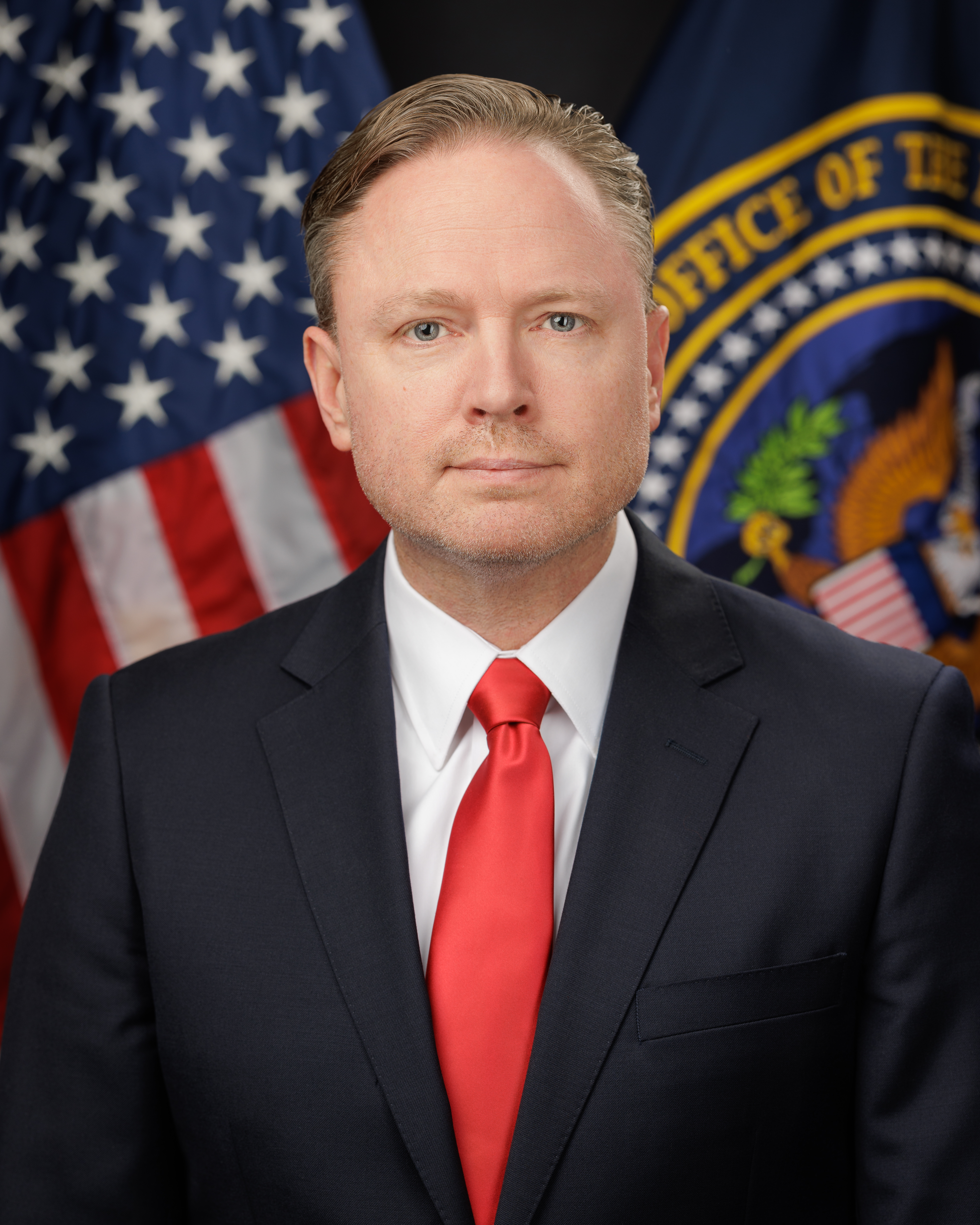
Principal Deputy Director Aaron Lukas

The Office of the Director of National Intelligence is overseen by the director of national intelligence, a Senate-confirmed position. The director is assisted by the principal deputy director of national intelligence, who must also be confirmed by the Senate, and by as many as four other deputy directors. The Intelligence Reform and Terrorism Prevention Act requires that the director or the principal deputy director must be a military officer or show "an appreciation of military intelligence activities". The principal deputy director of national intelligence serves as the acting director of national intelligence in the event of a vacancy.

=== Agencies ===
The Office of the Director of National Intelligence oversees the National Counterterrorism Center (NCTC) and the National Counterintelligence and Security Center (NCSC). In August 2025, Director of National Intelligence Tulsi Gabbard eliminated the Foreign Malign Influence Center, the National Counterproliferation and Biosecurity Center, and the Cyber Threat Intelligence Integration Center.
