= Aaron Lukas =

American intelligence officer (born 1971)

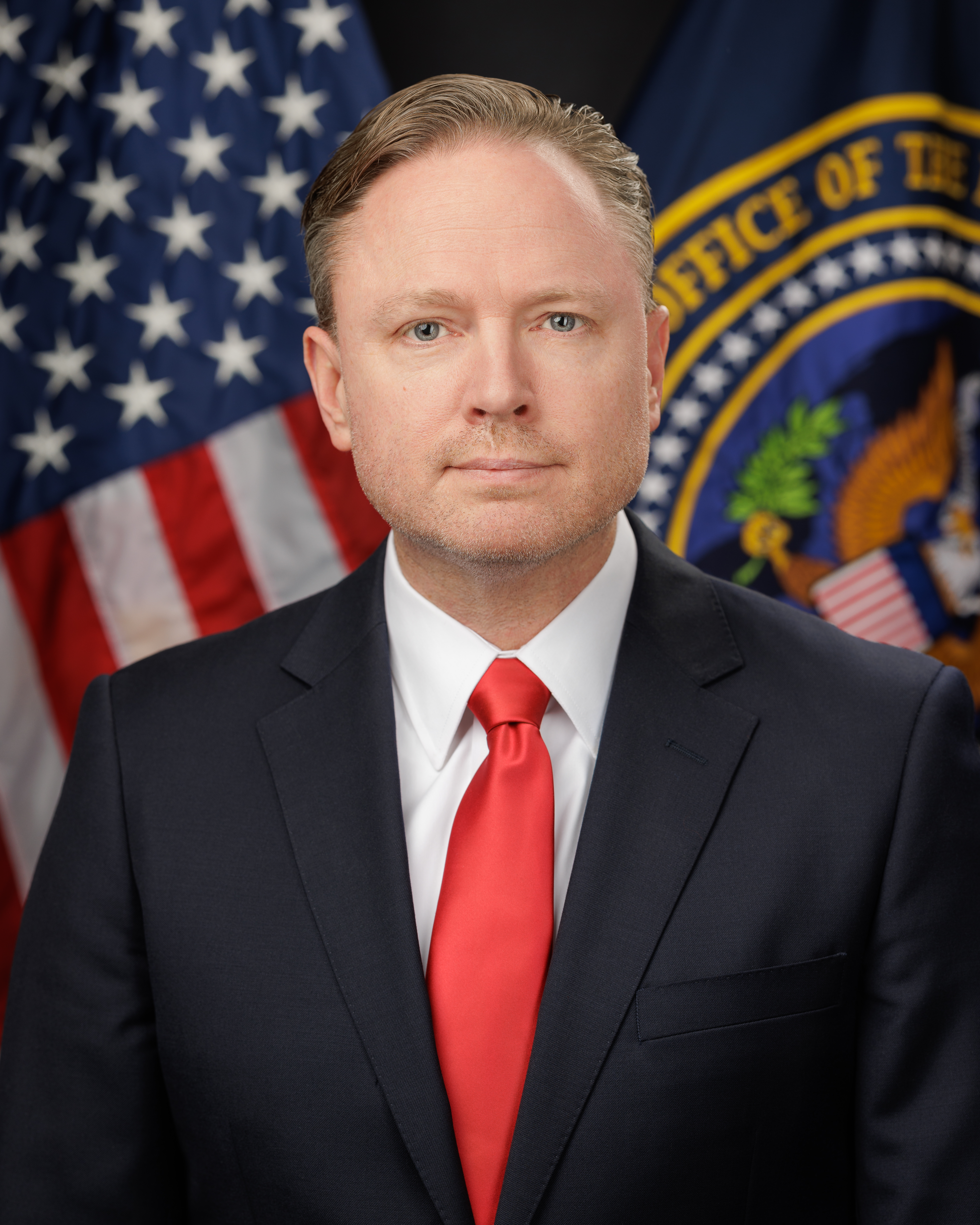
- Official portrait, 2025

Principal Deputy Director of National Intelligence
- Incumbent
- Assumed office July 24, 2025
- President: Donald Trump
- Director: Tulsi Gabbard; Jay Clayton
- Preceded by: Stacey Dixon

Personal details
- Born: Aaron Paul Lukas; May 18, 1971 (age 55) Toms River, New Jersey, U.S.
- Spouse: Carrie Lukas (m. 2003)
- Children: 5
- Education: Texas A&M University (BA); George Washington University (MA)

Aaron Paul Lukas (born May 18, 1971) is an American intelligence officer and policy analyst who has served as the principal deputy director of national intelligence since 2025.

Lukas graduated from Texas A&M University with a bachelor's degree in political science in 1993 and from George Washington University with a master's degree in international affairs in 1998. He interned at the Cato Institute beginning in 1995 and became a policy analyst in 1997. Lukas served as the chief speechwriter for Robert Zoellick, the United States trade representative, from 2002 to 2004.

In 2004, Lukas became an analyst, and later an operations officer, at the Central Intelligence Agency. He served as an intelligence aide to Richard Grenell, the acting director of national intelligence, in 2020, and later served as the deputy senior director for Europe and Russia at the National Security Council from 2020 to 2021.

In March 2025, President Donald Trump nominated Lukas to serve as the principal deputy director of national intelligence. He was confirmed by the Senate in July.

== Early life and education (1971–1997) ==
Aaron Paul Lukas was born on May 18, 1971, in Toms River, New Jersey. Lukas graduated from Texas A&M University with a bachelor's degree in political science in 1993. That year, he became the director of Students for Central and Eastern Europe. In 1998, Lukas graduated from George Washington University with a master's degree in international affairs.

== Career ==
=== Cato Institute (1995–2004) ===
Lukas interned at the Cato Institute beginning in 1995. He became an information systems manager the following year. In 1997, Lukas became a policy analyst at Cato's Center for Trade Policy Studies. Alongside Gary Dempsey, Lukas produced a documentary, Collateral Damage: The Balkans After NATO's Air War, in 1999. Lukas served as the chief speechwriter for Robert Zoellick, the United States trade representative, from 2002 to 2004. Lukas returned to the Cato Institute as a trade analyst by February 2004. He later married Carrie Lukas, a staffer at the Cato Institute.

=== Intelligence work (2004–2025) ===
In 2004, Lukas became an analyst at the Central Intelligence Agency. He became an operations officer the following year. At the Central Intelligence Agency, He was the station chief for a former country in the Soviet Union. Lukas served as an intelligence aide to Richard Grenell, the acting director of national intelligence, in 2020. Lukas served as the deputy senior director for Europe and Russia at the National Security Council from 2020 to 2021.

=== Principal Deputy Director of National Intelligence (2025–present) ===
In February 2025, Reuters reported that President Donald Trump was set to nominate Lukas as the principal deputy director of national intelligence. Trump nominated Lukas to the position on March 12. He appeared before the Senate Select Committee on Intelligence on April 9. He told the committee that the United States Intelligence Community had become "aimless, bloated, risk-averse, and disconnected". The Senate voted to confirm Lukas in a 51–46 vote on July 22.

After Tulsi Gabbard, the director of national intelligence, announced that she would resign in May 2026, Trump named Lukas as her acting successor. Trump later announced that he would appoint Bill Pulte, the director of the Federal Housing Finance Agency, to succeed Gabbard.

== Views ==
In December 2000, Lukas was photographed holding a sign supporting the machine tabulation of the 2000 presidential election in Florida amid the Supreme Court's hearing of Bush v. Gore. He is a critic of diversity, equity, and inclusion initiatives. In February 2026, Lukas wrote on X that "bad actors weaponized intelligence" in an effort to damage Donald Trump. He has rejected the assessment that the Russian government colluded to interfere in the 2016 presidential election.

In 2020, Lukas donated to Martha McSally's campaign in that year's Senate special election in Arizona and Nick Freitas's campaign in the Virginia's seventh congressional district election. He additionally donated to Ricky Gill's campaign in the 2022 House of Representatives election for California's tenth congressional district and Blake Masters's campaign in the 2022 Senate election in Arizona.

== Personal life ==
Lukas met his wife, Carrie, while working with her at the Cato Institute. She serves as president for the Independent Women's Forum. They married in 2003 and are raising five children together in Virginia.

== Works cited ==
- "Questionnaire for Completion by Presidential Nominees" (PDF). United States Senate Select Committee on Intelligence. April 3, 2025.

Political offices
Preceded by Tulsi Gabbard	Director of National Intelligence; Acting; 2026	Succeeded by Bill Pulte; Acting
