= Tulsi Gabbard =

American politician and military officer (born 1981)

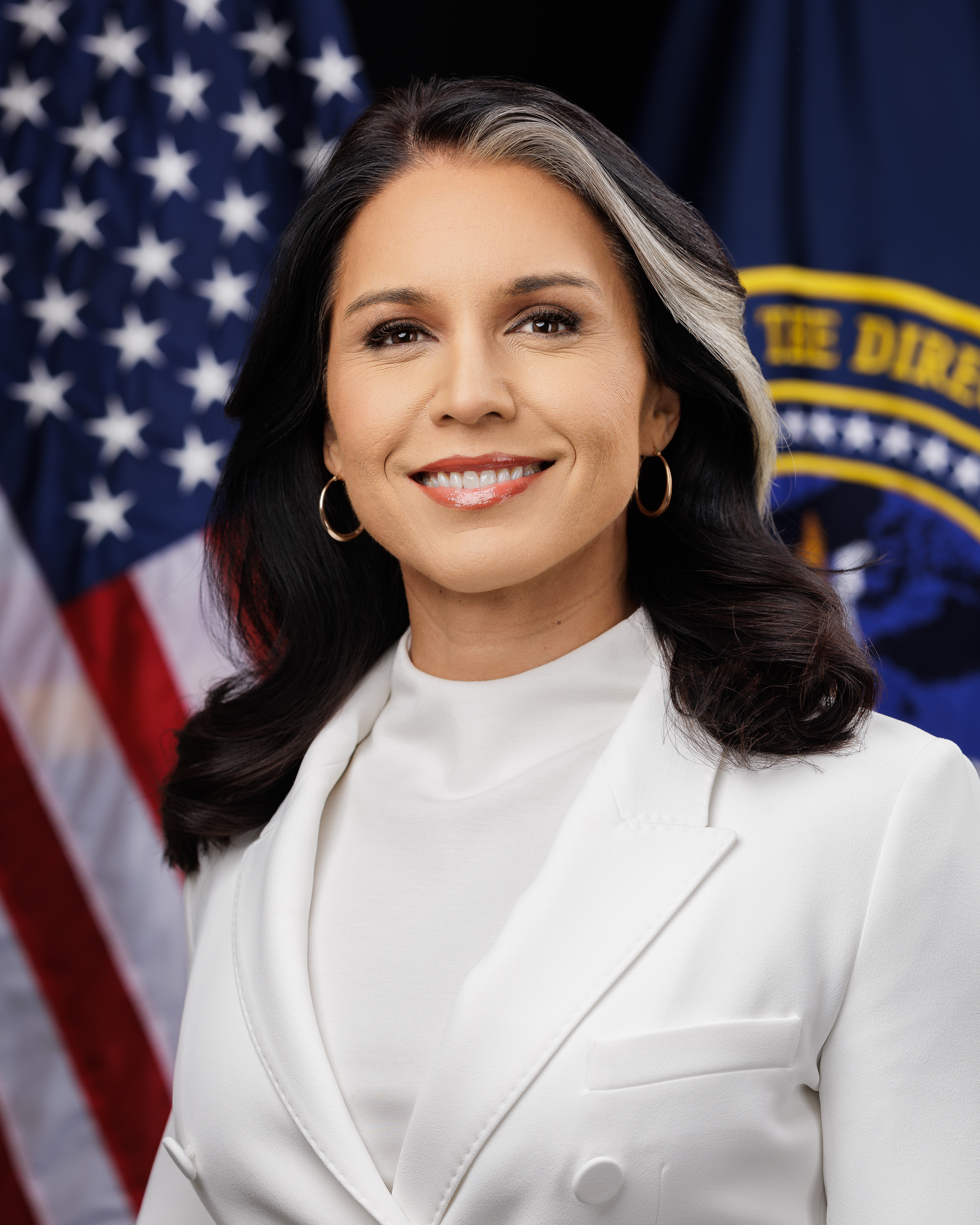
- Official portrait, 2025

8th Director of National Intelligence
- In office February 12, 2025 – June 19, 2026
- President: Donald Trump
- Deputy: Aaron Lukas
- Preceded by: Avril Haines
- Succeeded by: Bill Pulte (acting); Jay Clayton

Member of the U.S. House of Representatives from Hawaii's 2nd district
- In office January 3, 2013 – January 3, 2021
- Preceded by: Mazie Hirono
- Succeeded by: Kai Kahele

Vice Chair of the Democratic National Committee
- In office January 22, 2013 – February 27, 2016
- Chair: Debbie Wasserman Schultz
- Preceded by: Mike Honda
- Succeeded by: Grace Meng

Member of the Honolulu City Council from the 6th district
- In office January 2, 2011 – August 16, 2012
- Preceded by: Rod Tam
- Succeeded by: Carol Fukunaga

Member of the Hawaii House of Representatives from the 42nd district
- In office November 5, 2002 – November 2, 2004
- Preceded by: Mark Moses
- Succeeded by: Rida Cabanilla

Personal details
- Born: April 12, 1981 (age 45) Leloaloa, American Samoa
- Party: Republican (2024–present)
- Other political affiliations: Democratic (before 2022); Independent (2022–2024)
- Spouses: Eduardo Tamayo (m. 2002; div. 2006); Abraham Williams (m. 2015)
- Parent: Mike Gabbard (father)
- Relatives: Caroline Sinavaiana-Gabbard (aunt)
- Education: Leeward Community College (attended); Hawaii Pacific University (BS)

Military service
- Branch/service: United States Army; Army National Guard; Army Reserve
- Years of service: 2003–present
- Rank: Lieutenant Colonel
- Unit: Hawaii Army National Guard
- Commands: 440th Civil Affairs Battalion
- Battles/wars: Iraq War
- Awards: Meritorious Service Medal; Army Commendation Medal (2); Army Achievement Medal (2); Army Good Conduct Medal; Combat Medical Badge
- Gabbard's voice Gabbard supporting the recognition of the Armenian genocide Recorded October 31, 2019

Tulsi Gabbard (/ˈtʌlsi ˈɡæbərd/; born April 12, 1981) is an American politician and U.S. Army officer who served as the eighth Director of National Intelligence (DNI) from 2025 to 2026. She previously served as U.S. representative for Hawaii's 2nd congressional district from 2013 to 2021 and in the Hawaii House of Representatives from 2002 to 2004. Gabbard was a member of the Democratic Party until 2022, after which she became independent before joining the Republican Party in 2024.

Gabbard joined the Hawaii Army National Guard in 2003 and was deployed to Iraq from 2004 to 2005, where she served with a medical unit, and received the Combat Medical Badge. In 2007, Gabbard completed the officer training program at the Alabama Military Academy. She went to Kuwait in 2008 as an Army Military Police officer. In 2015, while also serving in Congress, Gabbard became a major with the Hawaii Army National Guard. In 2020, she transferred to the U.S. Army Reserve and was promoted to the rank of lieutenant colonel in 2021.

In 2012, Gabbard was elected to the U.S. House of Representatives from Hawaii's 2nd congressional district. She became the first Samoan American and Hindu American member of the U.S. Congress. During her tenure in Congress, she served on the House Armed Services Committee (HASC) and the House Foreign Affairs Committee. She supported the military campaign to defeat Islamic extremism but opposed the U.S. intervention in the Syrian civil war. In her fourth term, Gabbard also served on the HASC Subcommittee on Intelligence, which oversaw military intelligence and counterterrorism.

Around 2020, Gabbard ran as a presidential candidate in the Democratic Party primaries with an anti-interventionist and populist pitch, but dropped out and endorsed Joe Biden in March 2020. Previously, she also served as vice-chair of the Democratic National Committee (DNC) from 2013 to 2016, but resigned to endorse Bernie Sanders for the 2016 Democratic presidential nomination. After her departure from Congress in 2021, Gabbard took more conservative positions on issues such as transgender rights, border security, and foreign policy. In 2022, she spoke at the Conservative Political Action Conference and left the Democratic Party.

In 2024, Gabbard endorsed Donald Trump for the presidential election and joined the Republican Party later that year. After Trump nominated Gabbard for DNI, her past statements on Syria and the Russian invasion of Ukraine drew scrutiny and concern. Many veterans and Republicans defended Gabbard's record, noting her military service and congressional experience. In February 2025, she was confirmed by the Senate, becoming the highest-ranking Pacific Islander American government official in U.S. history. In March 2026, Trump indicated that Gabbard differed with him on the issue of Iran and its nuclear program. Gabbard resigned from the post, citing family reasons, effective June 19, 2026.

== Early life and education ==
Gabbard was born on April 12, 1981, in Leloaloa on American Samoa's main island of Tutuila. She is the fourth of five children born to Mike Gabbard and his wife Carol (née Porter). In 1983, when she was two years old, her family moved back to Hawaii, where they had lived in the late 1970s. Her mother was born in Indiana and grew up in Michigan, and her father, who is of Samoan and European ancestry, was born in American Samoa; he grew up in Hawaii and Florida. Her name is derived from the herb tulasi.

Gabbard grew up in Honolulu. During her early years, Gabbard's parents owned a vegetarian restaurant, The Natural Deli in Moiliili, Hawaii, a neighbood of Honolulu. Gabbard participated in surfing, martial arts, and yoga as a child. She was mostly home schooled except for two years at a girls' school in the Philippines. Gabbard learned spiritual principles like karma, from the ancient Indian text Bhagavad Gita. As a teenager, she adopted the Hindu faith.

As a young adult, Gabbard worked for Stand Up For America (SUFA), founded by her father in the wake of the September 11 attacks. Around 2001, Gabbard's father got active in local politics and was elected to the Honolulu City Council. She was also associated with her father's The Alliance for Traditional Marriage and Values, an anti-gay marriage political action committee. Gabbard briefly worked as an educator with the Healthy Hawai'i Coalition, which promoted protection of Hawaii's natural environment. She also worked as a self-employed martial arts instructor.

In 2002, when she was 21, Gabbard dropped out of Leeward Community College in Pearl City, where she had been studying television production, to run for the Hawaii State Legislature, and she became the youngest woman ever elected as a U.S. state representative. In 2006, Gabbard's father became a Hawaii state senator. In 2009, Gabbard graduated from Hawaii Pacific University in Honolulu with a Bachelor of Science degree in business administration with a concentration in international business.

== Military service ==
In April 2003, while serving in the Hawaii State Legislature, Gabbard enlisted in the Hawaii Army National Guard. In July 2004, she was deployed for a 12-month tour in Iraq, serving with a medical company, Hawaii Army National Guard. In Iraq, Gabbard served at Logistical Support Area Anaconda, completing her tour in 2005. Because of the deployment, she chose not to campaign for reelection to the state legislature.

Gabbard received a Combat Medical Badge in 2005. She has been awarded the Meritorious Service Medal from the United States and she received the German Armed Forces Badge for Military Proficiency.

In March 2007, she graduated from the Accelerated Officer Candidate School at the Alabama Military Academy at the top of her class, the first woman ever to do so. After successfully completing officer training, Gabbard was commissioned as a second lieutenant, and assigned to the 29th Infantry Brigade Special Troops Battalion, this time to serve as an Army Military Police officer. She was stationed in Kuwait from 2008 to 2009 as an Army Military Police platoon leader. She was one of the first women to enter a Kuwaiti military facility, as well as the first woman to receive an award of appreciation from the Kuwait National Guard.

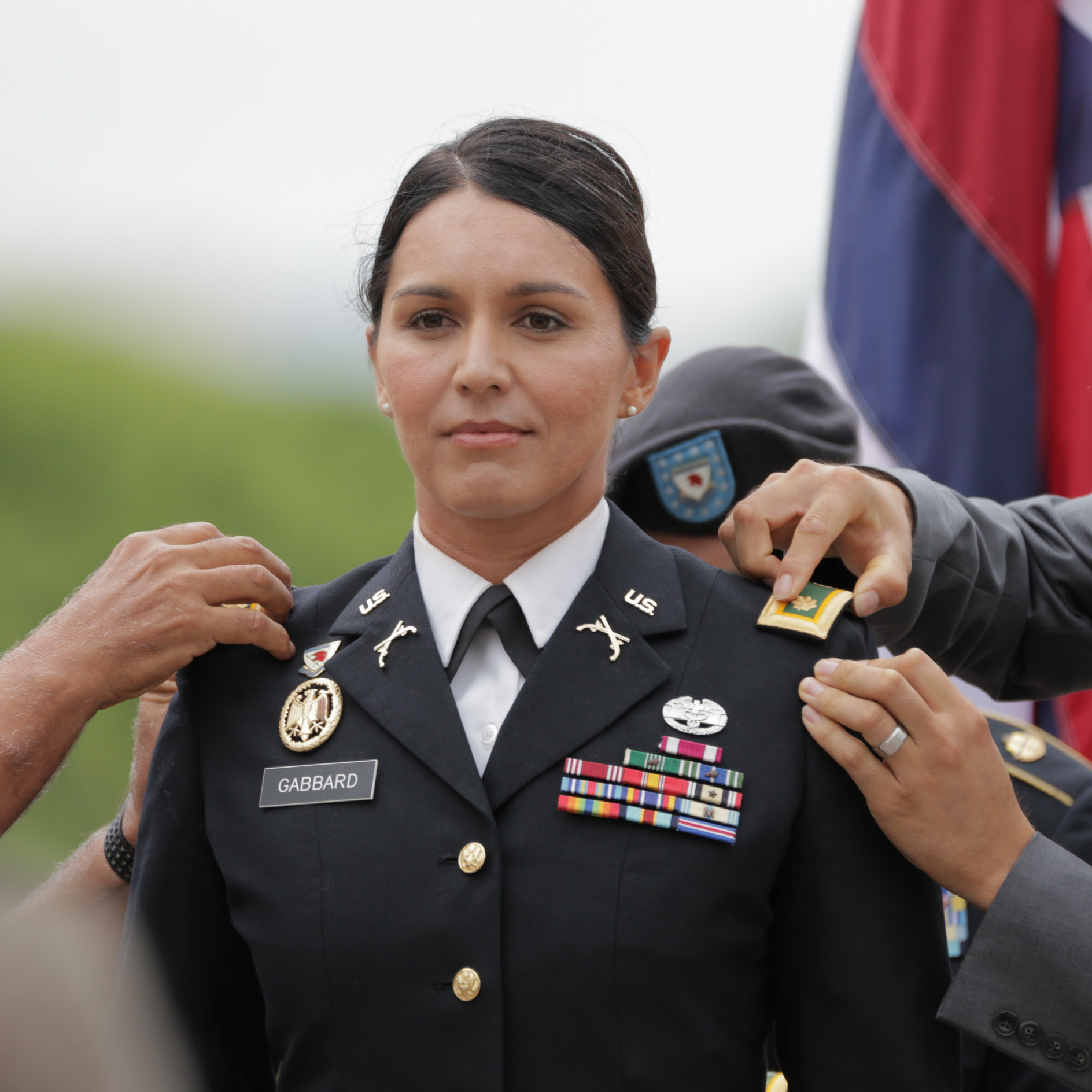
Gabbard at the ceremony of her promotion to major on October 12, 2015

On October 12, 2015, she was promoted from the rank of captain to major at a ceremony at the National Memorial Cemetery of the Pacific. She continued to serve as a major in the Hawaii Army National Guard until her transfer to the 351st Civil Affairs Command, a California-based United States Army Reserve unit assigned to the United States Army Civil Affairs and Psychological Operations Command, in June 2020.

On July 4, 2021, Gabbard was promoted to the rank of lieutenant colonel, while she was deployed to the Horn of Africa working as a civil affairs officer in support of a special operations mission. Next, she was given the command of the 1st Battalion, 354th Regiment, based in Tulsa, Oklahoma.

== Early political career ==
=== Hawaii House of Representatives (2002–2004) ===
In 2002, after redistricting, Gabbard (then credited as Tulsi Gabbard Tamayo or simply Tulsi Tamayo) won the four-candidate Democratic primary for the 42nd district of the Hawaii House of Representatives with a plurality of 43% of the vote. Gabbard then won the general election with 60.7% of the vote, defeating Republican Alfonso Jimenez. At the age of 21, Gabbard became the youngest legislator ever elected in Hawaii's history, and was at the time the youngest woman ever elected to a U.S. state legislature.

In 2004, Gabbard filed for reelection but then volunteered for Army National Guard service in Iraq. Rida Cabanilla, who filed to run against her, called on Gabbard to resign because she would not be able to effectively represent her district from Iraq. While she legally would have been allowed to hold her seat, a directive from the Defense Department issued in August 2004 would have forbidden her from voting on bills or fulfilling other duties of her elective office for the duration of her active duty deployment. Gabbard did not campaign for a second term, and Cabanilla won the Democratic primary with 58% of the vote. State law prevented the removal of Gabbard's name from the ballot.

=== Honolulu City Council (2011–2012) ===
After returning home from her second deployment to the Middle East in 2009, Gabbard ran for a seat on the Honolulu City Council vacated by City Councilman Rod Tam, of the 6th district, who decided to retire to run for mayor of Honolulu. In the 10-candidate nonpartisan open primary in September 2010, Gabbard finished first with 26.8% of the vote. The seat represented parts of downtown Honolulu, including Alewa Heights, Kalihi Valley, and areas of Makiki and Kalihi. During her campaign for the council, Gabbard was still publicly known as "Tulsi Gabbard Tamayo". During her campaign, Gabbard's opponents accused her of improperly using her tax-exempt Stand Up for America nonprofit to promote her candidacy. The organization (which as a 501(c)(3) organization was forbidden from endorsing political candidates) included content on its website which promoting her candidacy (including hyperlinks to her campaign website, as well as a reprint of a press release by her campaign). Gabbard called this an "honest mistake" by one of the organization's volunteers, and denied having had knowledge of it. Gabbard won election in the November 2 runoff election, capturing 49.5% of the vote and defeating Sesnita Moepono.

While on the council, Gabbard introduced a measure to help food truck vendors by loosening parking restrictions. She also introduced Bill 54, a measure that authorized city workers to confiscate personal belongings stored on public property with 24 hours notice to its owner. After overcoming opposition from the American Civil Liberties Union (ACLU) and Occupy Hawai'i, Bill 54 passed and became City Ordinance 1129.

== United States House of Representatives (2013–2021) ==
=== 113th Congress ===
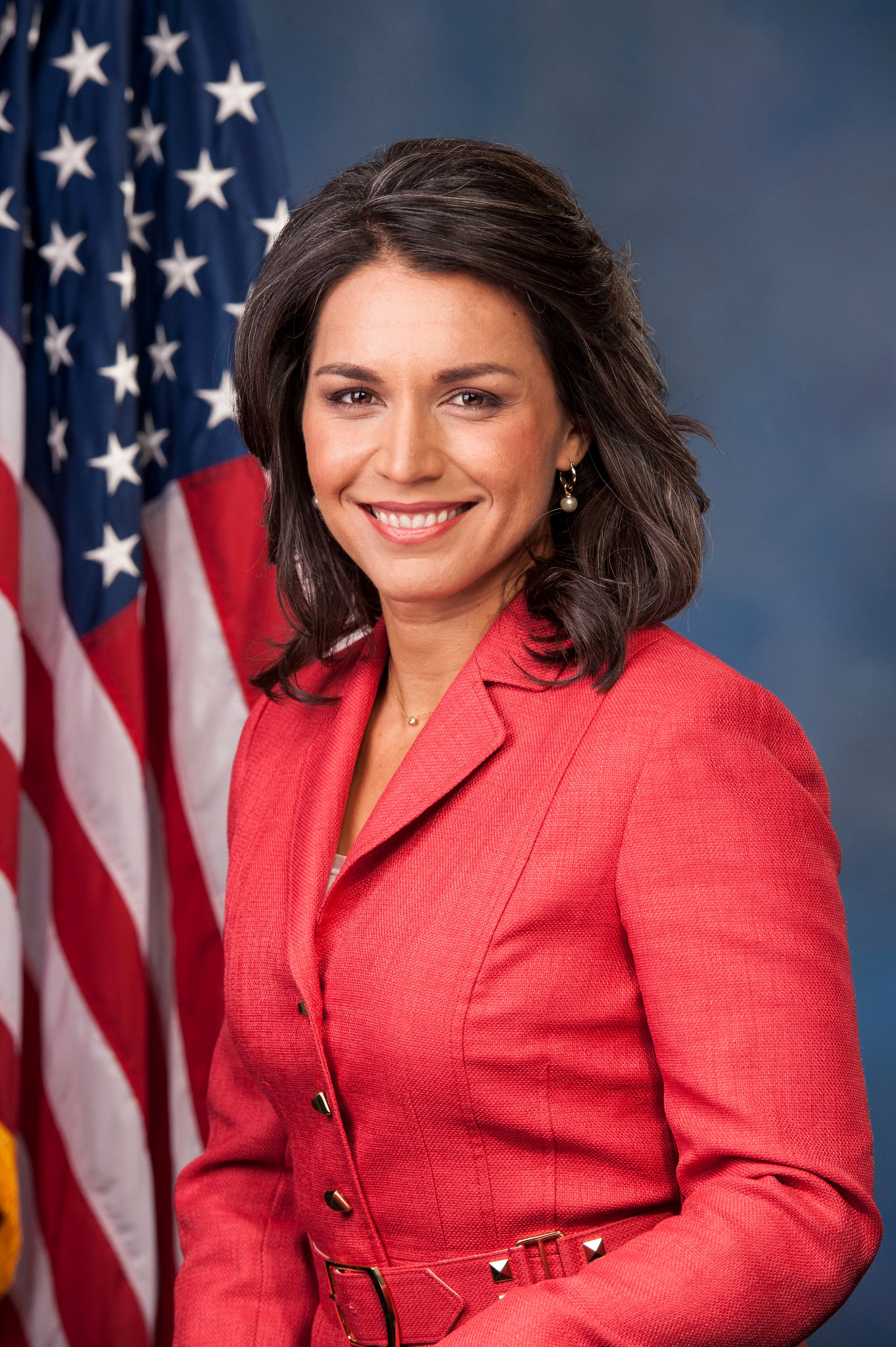
Gabbard during the 113th Congress

In early 2011, Mazie Hirono, the incumbent Democratic U.S. Representative for Hawaii's 2nd congressional district, launched her campaign for the U.S. Senate. In May 2011, Gabbard declared her candidacy for the open House seat. The Democratic mayor of Honolulu, Mufi Hannemann, was considered the frontrunner in the six-way primary, but Gabbard won with 55% of the vote. The Honolulu Star-Advertiser wrote about her victory saying it was an "improbable rise from a distant underdog to victory." She resigned from the Honolulu City Council on August 16, 2012, to focus on her congressional campaign.

As the Democratic nominee, Gabbard was invited by House Minority Leader Nancy Pelosi to speak at the 2012 Democratic National Convention, where she was introduced as "an emerging star." Gabbard was one of three female House candidates that were chosen to speak on-stage during a segment of the convention highlighting female membership in the party's House delegation. In her remarks (approximately one minute in length), she touched on her military background and praised President Barack Obama and Vice President Joe Biden (the party's national ticket) as "the strongest advocates military families could have". In the general election, she defeated Republican Kawika Crowley with 80.6% of the vote, becoming the first voting Samoan American and the first Hindu member of Congress.

In December 2012, Gabbard applied for appointment to the U.S. Senate seat vacated by the death of Daniel Inouye. Despite support from some prominent mainland Democrats, she was not among the three candidates forwarded to the governor by the Hawaii Democratic Party.

In March 2013, she introduced the Helping Heroes Fly Act to expedite airport security screening for severely wounded veterans. The bill received bipartisan support, passed unanimously in both chambers of Congress, and was signed into law by President Obama. She also introduced the House version of the Military Justice Improvement Act.

=== 114th Congress ===
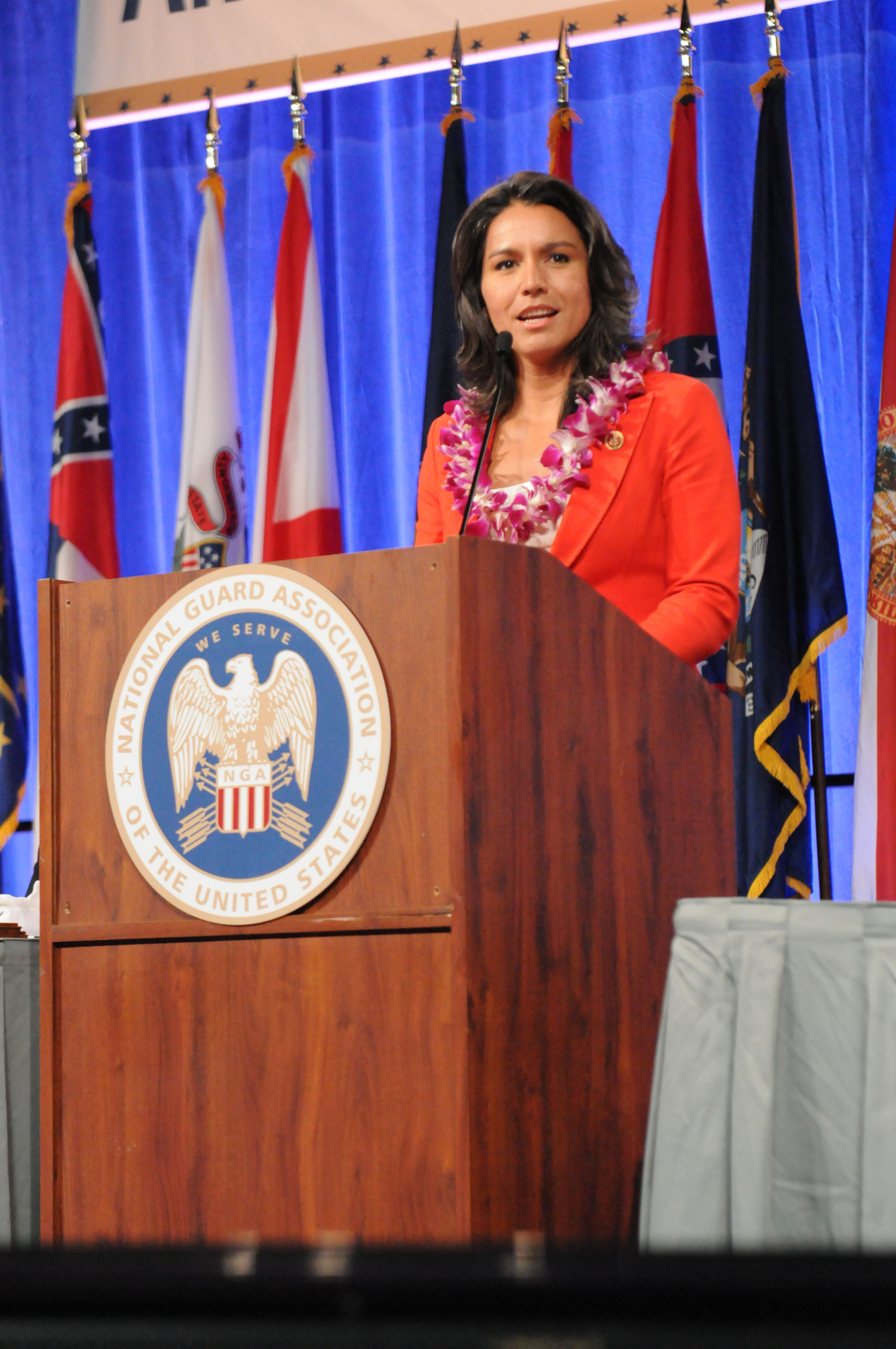
Gabbard speaks at the 135th National Guard Association of the United States conference in 2013.

Gabbard was reelected in 2014, defeating Crowley again with 78.7% of the vote. She co-sponsored a bill with Senator Hirono to award the Congressional Gold Medal to Filipino and Filipino American veterans of World War II. The bill was passed by Congress and signed into law by President Obama in December 2016.

In November 2015, Gabbard introduced Talia's Law, aimed at preventing child abuse and neglect on military bases. Congress passed the legislation in February 2016, and it was signed into law in December 2016.

=== 115th Congress ===
In the 2016 election, Gabbard was reelected with 81.2% of the vote, defeating Republican Angela Kaaihue.

In 2017, she introduced the Off Fossil Fuels (OFF) Act, which aimed for a transition to 100% clean energy by 2035. In 2018, she introduced the Securing America's Election Act, requiring all voting districts to use paper ballots to ensure an auditable paper trail. The bill was endorsed by the nonpartisan watchdog group Common Cause.

=== 116th Congress ===
Gabbard was reelected in 2018, defeating Republican Brian Evans with 77.4% of the vote. In September 2018, she and Republican Representative Walter Jones co-sponsored the No More Presidential Wars Act to reaffirm Congress's authority over war declarations.

On October 25, 2019, Gabbard stated she would not seek reelection in 2020, citing her presidential campaign. During the campaign, she faced criticism for missing votes, particularly the vote on Syria, though her absentee rate was similar to other members of Congress running for president. Between October and December 2019, she missed 85% of votes but cast a "present" vote on both articles of impeachment in the first impeachment of Donald Trump. After suspending her presidential campaign in March 2020, she resumed regular attendance.

In July 2020, Gabbard met with the family of Vanessa Guillén, a U.S. Army soldier and victim of military sexual harassment who was found murdered after previously being reported missing. Gabbard said that as a fellow service member in the U.S. Army, she was "stand[ing] here for Vanessa", "for her family", and called for reforms to address military sexual harassment.

In August 2020, she advocated for Jennifer Smith, a Hawaii Department of Health epidemiologist who reported issues with the state's COVID-19 contact tracing program. Smith was placed on paid leave, and Gabbard continued to support her until she was reinstated in November 2020. In September 2020, Gabbard converted her presidential campaign committee, Tulsi Now, into Tulsi Aloha, a leadership PAC. That same month, she criticized Netflix over the film Cuties, arguing that it contributed to the exploitation of children.

In October 2020, she and Representative Matt Gaetz introduced a bill calling for the U.S. to drop criminal charges against Edward Snowden. She also introduced a similar bill with Representative Thomas Massie advocating for Julian Assange's release from prison in the United Kingdom.

=== House committee assignments (2013–2021) ===
During her tenure in Congress, Gabbard served on multiple committees, focusing on military, foreign affairs, and financial issues. Notably, she was a long-time member of the House Armed Services Committee, where she worked on defense funding, military readiness, and intelligence oversight. In 2018, she successfully passed an amendment to improve protective equipment for civil defense agencies near volcanic activity.

In her fourth term, she served on the Armed Services Subcommittee on Intelligence, which oversaw military intelligence, national security, and counterterrorism efforts. As a member of this subcommittee, she participated in key hearings on emerging threats, such as cybersecurity and artificial intelligence in military operations.

- Committee on Homeland Security (2013–2014)
  - Subcommittee on Border and Maritime Security
- Committee on Armed Services (2013–2021)
  - Subcommittee on Readiness
  - Subcommittee on Intelligence and Special Operations (2019–2021)
- Committee on Foreign Affairs (2013–2019)
  - Subcommittee on Asia and the Pacific
  - Subcommittee on the Middle East and North Africa
- Committee on Financial Services (2019–2021)
  - Subcommittee on National Security, International Development and Monetary Policy
  - Subcommittee on Diversity and Inclusion

=== Caucus memberships (2013–2021) ===
Gabbard was a member of several congressional caucuses, including:

- Congressional Progressive Caucus
- Congressional Asian Pacific American Caucus
- Congressional NextGen 9-1-1 Caucus
- Medicare for All Caucus
- U.S.-Japan Caucus

=== Democratic National Committee (DNC) ===
On January 22, 2013, Gabbard was unanimously elected as a vice chair of the Democratic National Committee (DNC). In September 2015, she criticized DNC chair Debbie Wasserman Schultz's decision to limit the number of debates in the 2016 Democratic primary. Following her criticism, she was reportedly asked not to attend the October 2015 debate in Las Vegas.

Gabbard later accused Wasserman Schultz of favoring Hillary Clinton in the primary and resigned as DNC vice chair on February 28, 2016, to endorse Bernie Sanders. She appeared on Meet the Press to discuss her resignation and later launched a petition to eliminate superdelegates in the Democratic nomination process. At the 2016 Democratic National Convention, she gave the nominating speech for Sanders. In 2017, she endorsed Keith Ellison for DNC chair.

During the 2016 election, she was listed as Sanders's running mate for write-in votes in California. Shortly after the election, she was mentioned as a potential 2020 presidential candidate. A Minnesota faithless elector cast a vote for Sanders as president and Gabbard as vice president, though this vote was nullified per state law.

== 2020 presidential campaign ==
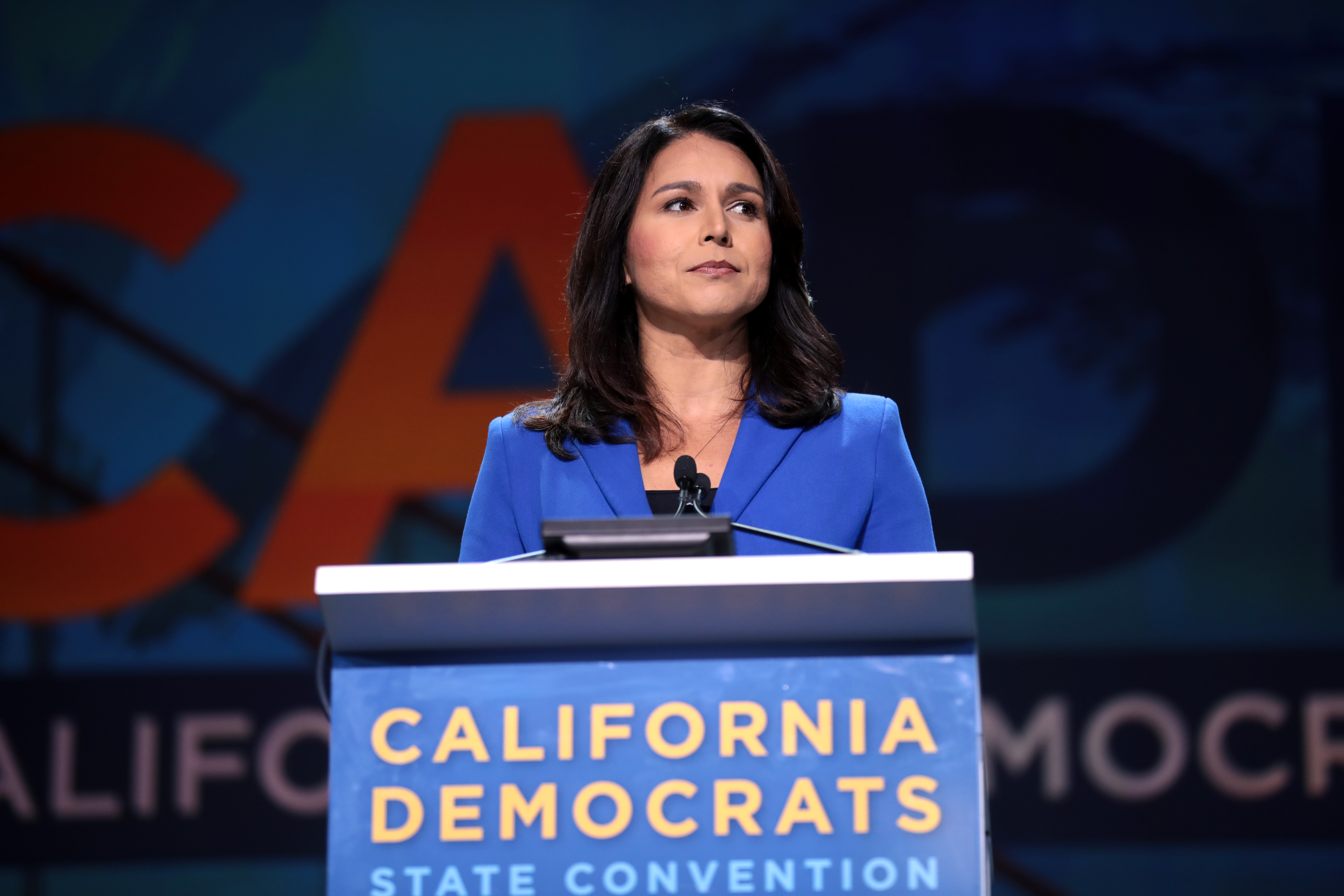
Gabbard speaking at the state Democratic Party convention in San Francisco, June 2019

Tulsi Gabbard 2020 presidential campaign logo

In February 2019, Gabbard officially launched her 2020 presidential campaign. She was the first female combat veteran to run for president. CNN described her foreign policy platform as anti-interventionist and her economic platform as populist. Gabbard was the most frequently Googled candidate after the first, second, and fourth 2020 Democratic primary debates. During the second debate, Gabbard criticized Kamala Harris's record as attorney general of California, accusing her of holding innocent people on death row and asserting that Harris owed them an apology.

In the second debate, when asked about her meeting with Assad, she said she "will never apologize for doing all that I can to prevent more of my brothers and sisters from being sent into harm's way to fight counterproductive regime change wars that made our country less safe.... [I]f that means meeting with a dictator or meeting with an adversary, absolutely, I would do it. This is about the national security of our country." When Anderson Cooper asked if she considered Assad a torturer and murderer, Gabbard responded "That's not what this is about. I don't defend or apologize or have anything to do with what he has done." Cooper repeated his question, asking if she agreed that "Assad is a murderer and a torturer"; Gabbard responded "I don't dispute that."

In a CNN panel discussion the next day, A.B. Stoddard, associate editor of Real Clear Politics, observed: "it is all over the internet today that the Russian bots are helping Tulsi Gabbard [and] that [she] refuses to condemn Assad because she's doing the work of the Russians and is going to run as a third-party spoiler and reelect Trump." Stoddard continued: "There are serious knives out for Tulsi Gabbard."

While Gabbard did not meet the polling threshold for the third presidential debate, she did qualify for the fourth debate in Ohio in October 2019. In July 2019, Gabbard was the only 2020 presidential candidate to visit Puerto Rico and join protests urging Governor Ricardo Rosselló to resign.

In September 2019, Vanity Fair summarized media coverage of Gabbard's presidential campaign as "the press hates Gabbard even more than it hates Sanders". The Hill's news anchor Krystal Ball and Chief Washington Correspondent Saagar Enjeti both described Gabbard as "the most unfairly maligned person in Washington". Ball noted that Gabbard had been "dismissed and otherized" by the media, with her campaign scrutinized for alleged Russian ties, citing as examples: NBC News suggestion that her campaign was enhanced by Russian bots, based on a group that had in another instance been revealed for fabricating such claims; and The Daily Beast's accusation she was being supported by "Putin apologists", citing a small percentage of her donors. Ball said, "Her interaction with Assad is weaponized to undercut everything else Tulsi has to say about the American warfighting machine", pointing out that critics often have "a bit of a blind spot about their own foreign policy positions." Lexico-statistical analysis showed Gabbard received the most negative coverage during the June–September period.

In October 2019, former secretary of state and 2016 presidential nominee Hillary Clinton suggested that Gabbard was a "Russian asset". Gabbard was defended by fellow 2020 Democratic presidential candidates Andrew Yang, Pete Buttigieg and Bernie Sanders, who rejected Clinton's suggestion that Gabbard was a Russian asset. Trump also defended Gabbard. Initial news stories had mistakenly also reported Clinton claimed Russia was "grooming" Gabbard to run as a third-party candidate, who would help president Donald Trump win reelection via a spoiler effect. However, Gabbard had repeatedly said she would not run as a third-party candidate in 2020 and did not do so. CNN host Van Jones, meanwhile, opined that Clinton's statement was "a complete smear with no facts". Gabbard herself condemned Clinton's remarks in tweets, calling Clinton "the queen of warmongers" and the "personification of the rot that has sickened the Democratic Party for so long." She claimed there was a campaign to destroy her reputation, orchestrated by Clinton via proxies in media and the war machine. In January 2020, Gabbard filed a legal defamation lawsuit against Clinton over the 'Russian asset' assertion as indicated in the complaint; but dropped it five months later with her lawyers saying that the legal merit was valid but, living in a "post-Covid world", they could better focus their attention elsewhere.

Also in October 2019, The Nation's James Carden wrote: "McCarthyism had gone mainstream" as media attacked Gabbard. He saw the Clinton-Gabbard feud as part of "a long campaign of vilification against critics of the Russia consensus" by Clinton and "her allies in the media (which very much include certain former high-ranking members of the US intelligence community)". After both the November and December 2019 debates, Saturday Night Live's parodies of the debates showed Gabbard as the villain, introduced her with menacing music and flashing lights and had her actress laughing evil and making threats.

On March 3, 2020, Gabbard, who is of Samoan descent, earned two delegates in American Samoa, making her the second woman of color (after Shirley Chisholm) and the first Asian-American and Pacific-Islander presidential candidate to earn primary delegates. As of March 15, she was one of the three remaining candidates alongside Joe Biden and Bernie Sanders who had not suspended their campaigns. In an interview on Fox, she highlighted a Rasmussen poll showing that 49% of voters supported her inclusion in debates with Sanders and Biden, and accused the DNC and the media of attempting to "shut her down" since her campaign's inception through tactics like character assassination, media blackouts, and blocking her message from reaching the public. On March 19, 2020, she dropped out of the 2020 election and endorsed former vice president Joe Biden. Gabbard was the only candidate with primary delegates to not be invited to the 2020 Democratic National Convention.

== Post-congressional activities (2021–2025) ==
In January 2021, Gabbard launched her own podcast, called This is Tulsi Gabbard. She also made several appearances on Fox News programs since leaving Congress, where she criticized figures such as House speaker Nancy Pelosi and U.S. representative Adam Schiff, calling the latter a "domestic terrorist" for what she deemed as his attempt to "undermin[e] our constitution by trying to take away our civil liberties and rights" in the aftermath of the 2021 storming of the U.S. Capitol.

In November 2021, she celebrated the victory of Republican candidate Glenn Youngkin in the Virginia Gubernatorial election over Democratic candidate Terry McAuliffe, and tweeted, "McAuliffe's loss is a victory for all Americans. Why? Because it was a resounding rejection of efforts to divide us by race, the stripping of parental rights, and arrogant, deaf leaders. This benefits us all". In an appearance on Hannity in April 2022, she expressed support for Florida's publicly debated Parental Rights Bill, and said that in her opinion it did not go far enough in that it only covered grades K through 3, while Gabbard believed it should have continued all the way through twelfth grade. (A follow-up bill in the state did just that one year later.) In 2022 Gabbard spoke at the Conservative Political Action Conference (CPAC), drawing criticism from Hawaii Democrats.

=== Party switch ===
On October 11, 2022, Gabbard left the Democratic Party, accusing its leadership of "cowardly wokeness, anti-white racism, [being] hostile to people of faith and spirituality, and dragging us closer to nuclear war".

Shortly thereafter, she endorsed and campaigned for several Donald Trump-supported Republican candidates in the 2022 midterm elections. Among those she endorsed were Senate candidates Don Bolduc, Adam Laxalt and JD Vance, and Arizona gubernatorial candidate Kari Lake.

When Donald Trump entered the 2024 Republican presidential primary, commentators suggested that he might consider Gabbard as a potential running mate. On February 22, 2024, she was a featured speaker at CPAC, raising speculation of her candidacy as a potential vice-presidential selection. During a Fox & Friends interview on March 6, she was directly asked about serving as Trump's vice president. She responded, "I would be honored to serve our country in that way and be in a position to help President Trump." In March 2024, Trump cited her as one of his potential choices for his running mate.

On August 26, 2024, Gabbard endorsed Trump's re-election bid during a National Guard Association gathering in Michigan. The next day, she was named as an honorary co-chair of his presidential transition team, alongside Robert F. Kennedy Jr., joining Trump's sons and the Republican vice-presidential nominee, JD Vance. In October 2024 she joined the Republican Party.

=== Media appearances ===
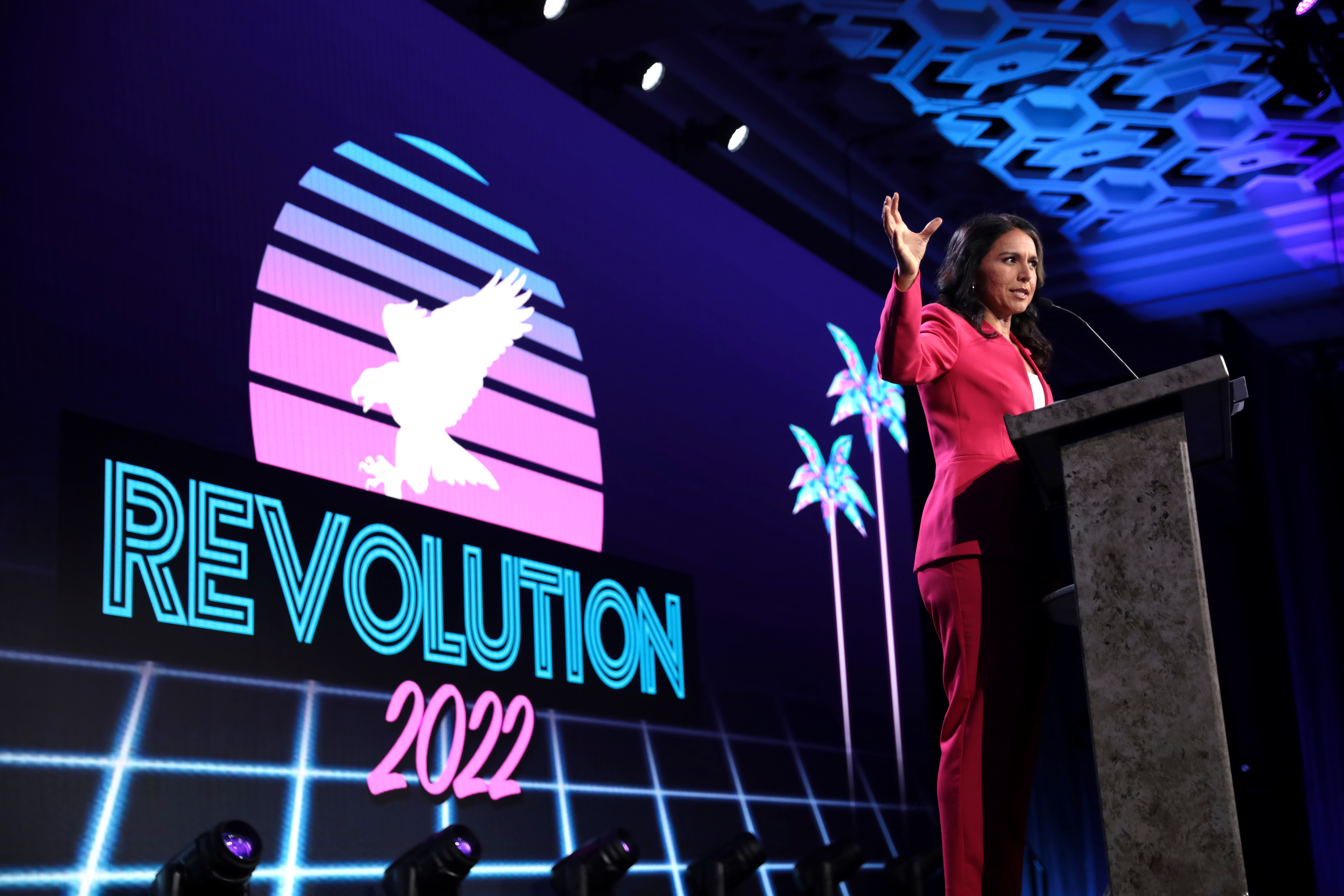
Gabbard at the Young Americans for Liberty's (YAL) "Revolution 2022" event, August 2022

In August 2022, Gabbard began serving as the fill-in host for Tucker Carlson Tonight, and she continued to be a frequent guest host of the show until its cancellation in 2023. In November 2022, after years of being a frequent guest on several of their programs, she signed a deal with Fox News as a paid contributor. In this role, she worked as a frequent guest and occasional host on shows such as The Five, Outnumbered, Hannity, Jesse Watters Primetime, and Gutfeld!.

== Director of National Intelligence (2025–2026) ==
=== Nomination ===
On November 13, 2024, President-elect Donald Trump nominated Gabbard as director of national intelligence (DNI), citing her military experience and leadership.

==== Support ====
Republican senators defended her nomination against Democratic criticisms, with Senator Eric Schmitt arguing that political differences do not equate to disloyalty, and Senator Markwayne Mullin rejecting claims that she was compromised by Russia. On January 27, 2025, former intelligence and national security officials expressed support for Gabbard, asserting she would help depoliticize intelligence agencies. Libertarian-leaning GOP senators backed her anti-interventionist stance, and former Trump Deputy National Security Advisor Victoria Coates emphasized the need for new intelligence leadership given global events. Former CIA Counterterrorism Chief Bernard Hudson praised her integrity and experience.

The National Border Patrol Council and the National Sheriffs' Association endorsed her for her commitment to national security. Over 250 veterans, including Representative Brian Mast and former Acting Secretary of Defense Christopher C. Miller, signed a letter supporting her nomination. Vice President JD Vance and Secretary of State Marco Rubio highlighted her military and congressional experience as qualifications for the role.

==== Opposition ====
Gabbard's nomination was met with controversy. Media coverage was widely critical, and Democrats raised concerns about her past meeting with Syrian President Bashar al-Assad and remarks perceived as aligning with Russian narratives. Critics, including former CIA Director Leon Panetta, questioned her lack of intelligence experience and opposition to U.S. involvement in Ukraine.

The New York Times noted that while Russian media had amplified Gabbard's foreign policy views, there was no evidence of collaboration with Russian intelligence, and she had opposed Russia's invasion of Ukraine. Democratic legislators, including Debbie Wasserman Schultz, Jason Crow, Tammy Duckworth, and Elizabeth Warren, labeled her a "likely Russian asset." Over 100 former national security officials signed a letter opposing her nomination. Gabbard's spokesperson dismissed these concerns as politically motivated attacks.

=== Confirmation ===
Tulsi Gabbard during her confirmation hearing before the United States Senate Select Committee on Intelligence

Gabbard testified before the Senate Select Committee on Intelligence on January 30, 2025. She pledged to separate her political views from her official duties. "Those who oppose my nomination imply that I am loyal to something or someone other than God, my own conscience, and the constitution of the United States, accusing me of being Trump's puppet, Putin's puppet, Assad's puppet, a guru's puppet, Modi's puppet, not recognizing the absurdity of simultaneously being the puppet of five different puppet masters", she said in her opening statement.

She denied knowing Edward Snowden while he worked in Hawaii's NSA facility near Wahiawā (Note: Edward Snowden was employed by an NSA contractor and misappropriated 1.5 million classified documents in 2013. He later leaked some documents about U.S. government surveillance practices. He fled first to Hong Kong and then to Moscow where he was given asylum and granted permanent Russian residency. Snowden claimed that he was "trapped" in Moscow, en route from Hong Kong to Cuba, when the U.S. canceled his passport. and citizenship.) and defended her past advocacy for reforming the Espionage Act, including a House resolution she introduced with Representative Matt Gaetz. Senators repeatedly asked Gabbard to label Snowden a traitor, but she declined, citing the term's legal and political implications in a follow-up op-ed. She acknowledged Snowden had broken the law by releasing information that caused harm, though she also highlighted the exposure of illegal surveillance practices. She confirmed she would not, as DNI, advocate for Snowden's pardon or clemency.

Senator Michael Bennet criticized her stance on Section 702 of the Foreign Intelligence Surveillance Act. Gabbard clarified her position, defending the necessity of 702 for national security while stressing the need for reforms to protect civil liberties, particularly advocating for warrants in certain U.S. person queries. (Note: Section 702 permits the Attorney General and the Director of National Intelligence to jointly authorize surveillance of non-US persons reasonably believed to be located outside the United States. U.S. citizens may be incidentally surveilled.) Post-hearing, she committed to collaborate with the committee on reauthorizing and any additional reforms."

Regarding her 2017 Syria trip with former Congressman Dennis Kucinich, she stated that he arranged the meetings and denied knowledge of extremist remarks made by Grand Mufti Ahmad Badreddin Hassoun. She clarified that her trip had been cleared by House Ethics and that she informed the Trump administration upon her return. In response to concerns about intelligence disclosures, Gabbard stated she would ensure whistleblowers had proper legal channels, including a direct hotline to the DNI. She assured Senator Todd Young that she would not protect those who disclosed classified intelligence programs improperly.

Senator Susan Collins supported her nomination after Gabbard clarified her stance on Snowden and reducing the size of the DNI office. Senator James Lankford, initially concerned about surveillance policies, also backed her after her explanations. On February 4, 2025, the Senate Intelligence Committee advanced her nomination in a 9–8 party-line vote. Senator Lisa Murkowski supported her on February 10, 2025, and said that while she had concerns about some of Gabbard's past positions, she appreciated her commitment to oversight and ensuring civil liberties remain protected. The Senate confirmed her nomination on February 12, in a 52–48 vote, with only Senator Mitch McConnell among Republicans voting no.

=== Tenure ===
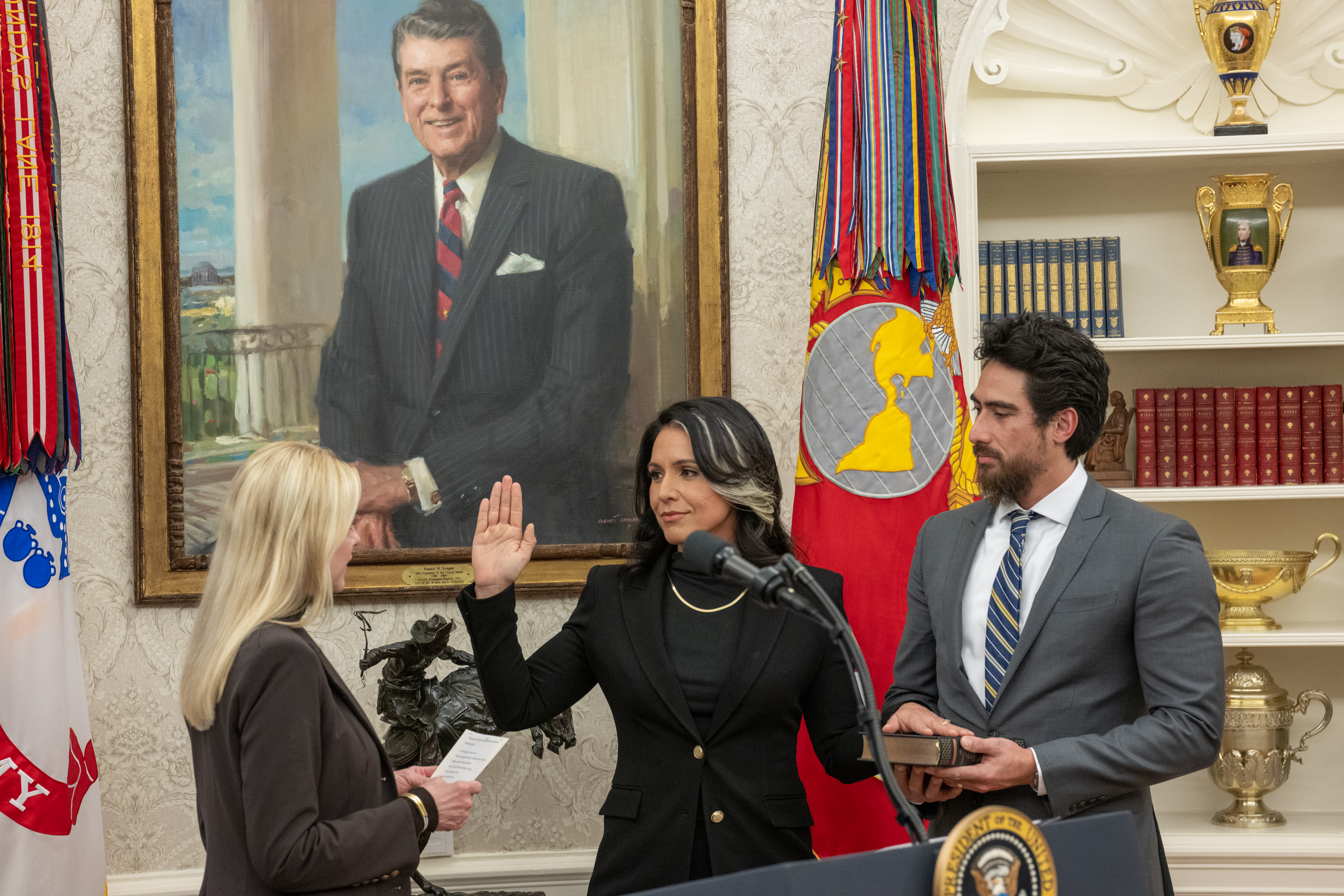
Gabbard being sworn in by Attorney General Pam Bondi, February 2025

Gabbard was sworn in as the 8th director of national intelligence (DNI) on February 12, 2025, by Attorney General Pam Bondi, taking the position responsible for leading 18 U.S. intelligence agencies and assuming the role of president's top intelligence adviser. After her swearing-in, Gabbard promised to "focus on ensuring the safety, security, and freedom of the American people" while echoing Trump's claims of politicization of the intelligence community and the need to rebuild trust. With this appointment, she became the first female military combat veteran to serve as DNI and first Pacific Islander American and first Hindu American to hold a Cabinet-level position.

Immediately after being sworn in, Gabbard made her first international trip as DNI to Germany to attend the Munich Security Conference. In March 2025, Gabbard's second international trip was to Asia with a focus on the Indo-Pacific, including Japan, Thailand, and India. Before traveling to Asia, Gabbard stopped in Hawaii, which hosts the U.S. military's Indo-Pacific Command headquarters. In her visit to India, Gabbard attended the Raisina Dialogue, an annual multinational conference of security officials held in New Delhi, and outlined the Trump administration's strategy for global peace and security.

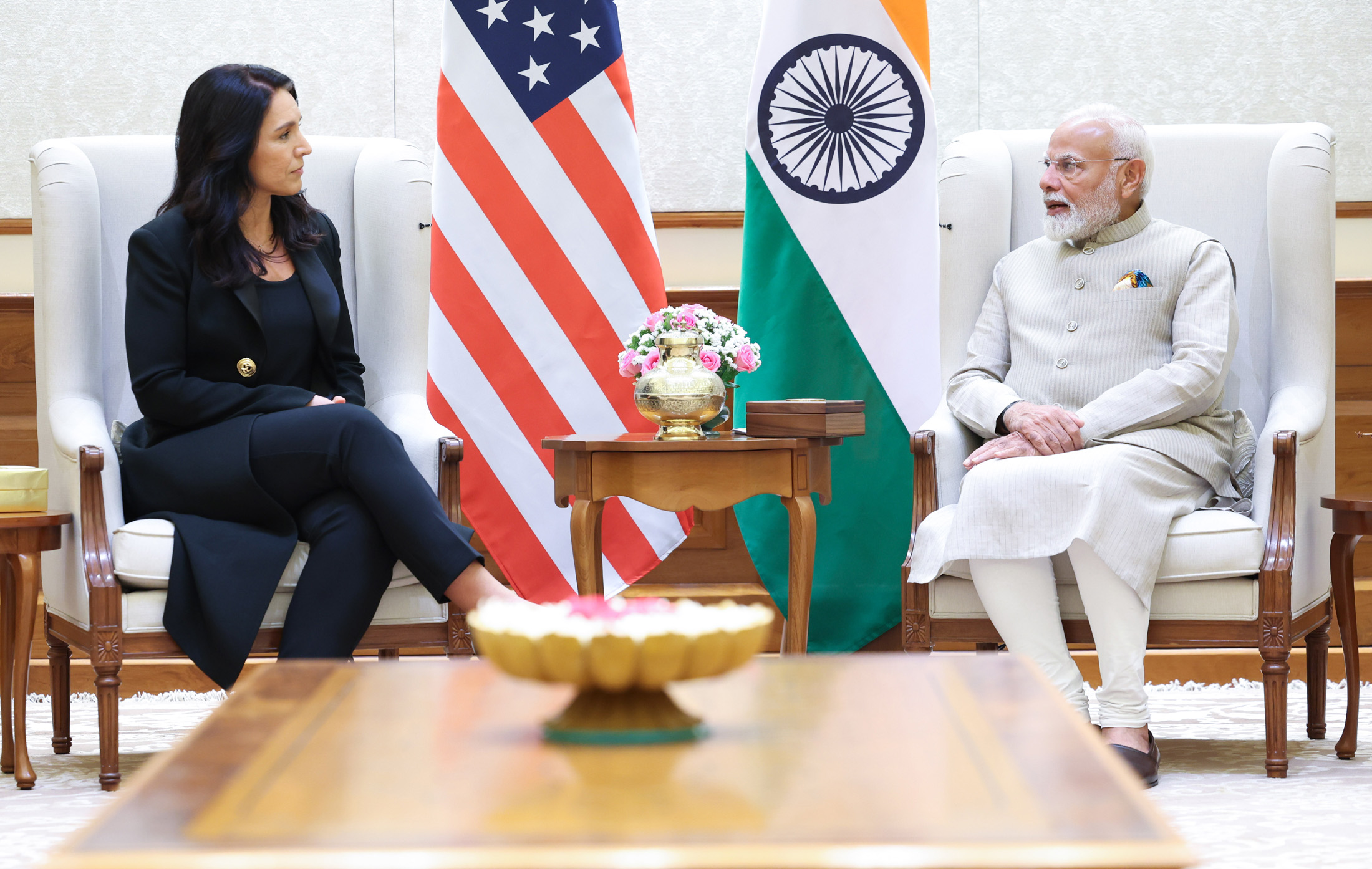
Gabbard with Indian Prime Minister Modi in New Delhi, March 2025

In March 2025, Gabbard, along with other senior members of the administration, discussed the plans for the US's attacks in Yemen on a Signal group chat that inadvertently included journalist Jeffrey Goldberg. When questioned by Congress, Gabbard admitted the addition of Goldberg to the chat by Mike Waltz was a "mistake", but claimed none of the information discussed was classified. After the Signal leak, reporters of Der Spiegel used other leaked data such as WikiLeaks to find personal online accounts of Gabbard and several other U.S. security officials. Gabbard's office asserted that she had not used those online accounts for several years.

In May 2025, Gabbard reoriented U.S. intelligence towards border security, counterterrorism, and counternarcotics, based upon the current administration's national security priorities. Speaking at the GEOINT 2025 Symposium, Gabbard noted the emphasis on domestic border surveillance, while addressing professionals across the geospatial intelligence sector. Further consolidation of intelligence operations included moving the National Intelligence Council (NIC) to the DNI's office. Gabbard also fired the two NIC officials after the council contradicted the Trump administration's position on Venezuelan gang members.

In July 2025, Gabbard released a previously classified report prepared by Republicans on the House Intelligence Committee. The report claimed that former President Obama's administration had manipulated intelligence to suggest that Russia had sought to damage Hillary Clinton's campaign, and boost Trump's campaign, in the 2016 presidential election. Gabbard claimed that this report, which was made in September 2020, provided "irrefutable evidence" of a "treasonous conspiracy", directly implicating Obama, to undermine the results of the 2016 election. In response, Obama dismissed the allegations as "outrageous and ridiculous" and "a weak attempt at distraction".

In August 2025, Gabbard implemented a 50% cut in the Office of the Director of National Intelligence staff and a $700 million reduction in its annual funding. According to the Federal News Network, Gabbard had already reduced ODNI staff by 25%; the BBC reported it was unclear if the 50% reduction was from a baseline before or after the 25% reduction. Gabbard also revoked the security clearances of 37 U.S. officials, who were accused of "politicizing and manipulating intelligence, leaking classified intelligence without authorization, and/or committing intentional egregious violations of tradecraft standards". The officials included those involved in assessments on Russia's efforts to interfere in the 2016 election and others who worked on national security under former Presidents Biden and Obama, and those who signed a letter supporting the impeachment inquiry into President Trump.

In December 2025, at a Turning Point event, Gabbard accused the Council on American-Islamic Relations of advocating the implementation of sharia, or Islamic law, in the United States, which Gabbard called antithetical to the United States Constitution. Gabbard further claimed that the city government of Paterson, New Jersey was planning to impose sharia, though Paterson Mayor Andre Sayegh rejected her claims and New Jersey Senator Cory Booker said these claims were dishonest.

In January 2026, Gabbard was briefly present during the FBI raid of Fulton County, Georgia election office, where agents seized ballots relating to the 2020 presidential election. Responding to criticism of her actions by Democrats, who were concerned with the involvement of the DNI in domestic criminal matters, Gabbard stated that Trump requested her presence and said she had "broad statutory authority" over election security and counterintelligence. In February 2026, there were allegations that Gabbard was "stonewalling" a whistleblower complaint about her handling of a call "between two members of foreign intelligence" which mentioned Jared Kushner.

In March 2026, Trump indicated that he and Gabbard differ on their approach to Iran and its nuclear program that Iran said were for civilian uses including generating nuclear power, labeling her as "softer" on the issue. In March 2026, Gabbard later stated that Iran posed a long-term threat due to the progression of its ballistic missile program. Responding to queries on immediate threat, she argued that "It is not the intelligence community’s responsibility to determine what is and is not an imminent threat", and that assessment was at the discretion of the President. Further, Gabbard stated, "Russia, China, North Korea, Iran, and Pakistan" have been developing advanced missile delivery systems that can reach the U.S. homeland.

In June 2026, during her final days as Director of National Intelligence, Gabbard's office released 67 declassified documents concerning the origins of COVID-19, U.S.-funded coronavirus research involving the Wuhan Institute of Virology, intelligence community assessments, and communications involving former National Institute of Allergy and Infectious Diseases director Anthony Fauci. According to the Office of the Director of National Intelligence, the release followed a year-long declassification review. In the release, Gabbard said the documents showed that Fauci had influenced intelligence assessments regarding COVID-19's origins, funded research connected to the Wuhan Institute of Virology, and provided false testimony to Congress. Subsequent news analyses concluded that the documents did not, by themselves, substantiate several of Gabbard's broader allegations. They also noted that the origins of COVID-19 remain disputed and that U.S. intelligence agencies have not reached a consensus.

=== Resignation ===
On May 22, 2026, Gabbard submitted her resignation after her husband was diagnosed with bone cancer. Trump appointed Aaron Lukas, the principal deputy director of national intelligence, as acting DNI. On June 2, Trump named Bill Pulte, the director of the Federal Housing Finance Agency, as acting DNI. The resignation was initially effective June 30, 2026, though later it was updated to June 19, 2026.

Gabbard had increasingly been sidelined from Trump's national-security team, considering her views against foreign interventions. While several sources reported that Gabbard was compelled to leave the position, some said that she was not forced to resign, but that her influence had eroded in recent months. Rumors had previously circulated that Gabbard might resign if military action were taken against Iran, though she responded that the rumors were not true. BBC noted her resignation came two months after her top aide, Joe Kent—the former director of the National Counterterrorism Center—left the administration over the war with Iran and urged the president to "reverse course."

== Domestic policy positions ==
While in the 2020 Democratic presidential primary, Gabbard's political positions were liberal on domestic policy issues, after 2020, she has taken more positions aligned with the Republican Party positions on social issues, including abortion, gun control, and transgender rights. In 2020, Gabbard introduced a bill to ban trans women from female sports, and supports that women sports should be for biological females, a position popular with conservatives. In 2022, she was also a featured speaker at the Conservative Political Action Conference (CPAC). She has also been a frequent critic of the Biden administration.

In 2026, an investigative journalist from The Washington Post, Jon Swaine, asserted that Gabbard received several political directions from an unnamed source during her years in Congress, and suggested that the source, who did not communicate directly to Gabbard but rather through intermediaries associated with the SIF, was likely her religious mentor, Chris Butler. The alleged communications included imperatives, at times rebuking Gabbard, and giving instructions on specific talking points that Gabbard apparently repeated verbatim in television appearances. The Post wrote that the documents, dated from 2011 to 2017, "could not show" whether guidance continued after Gabbard left Congress. Butler's organization has questioned the article's motivation, stating that it seemed to be driven by religious bigotry.

=== Drug policy and criminal justice reform ===
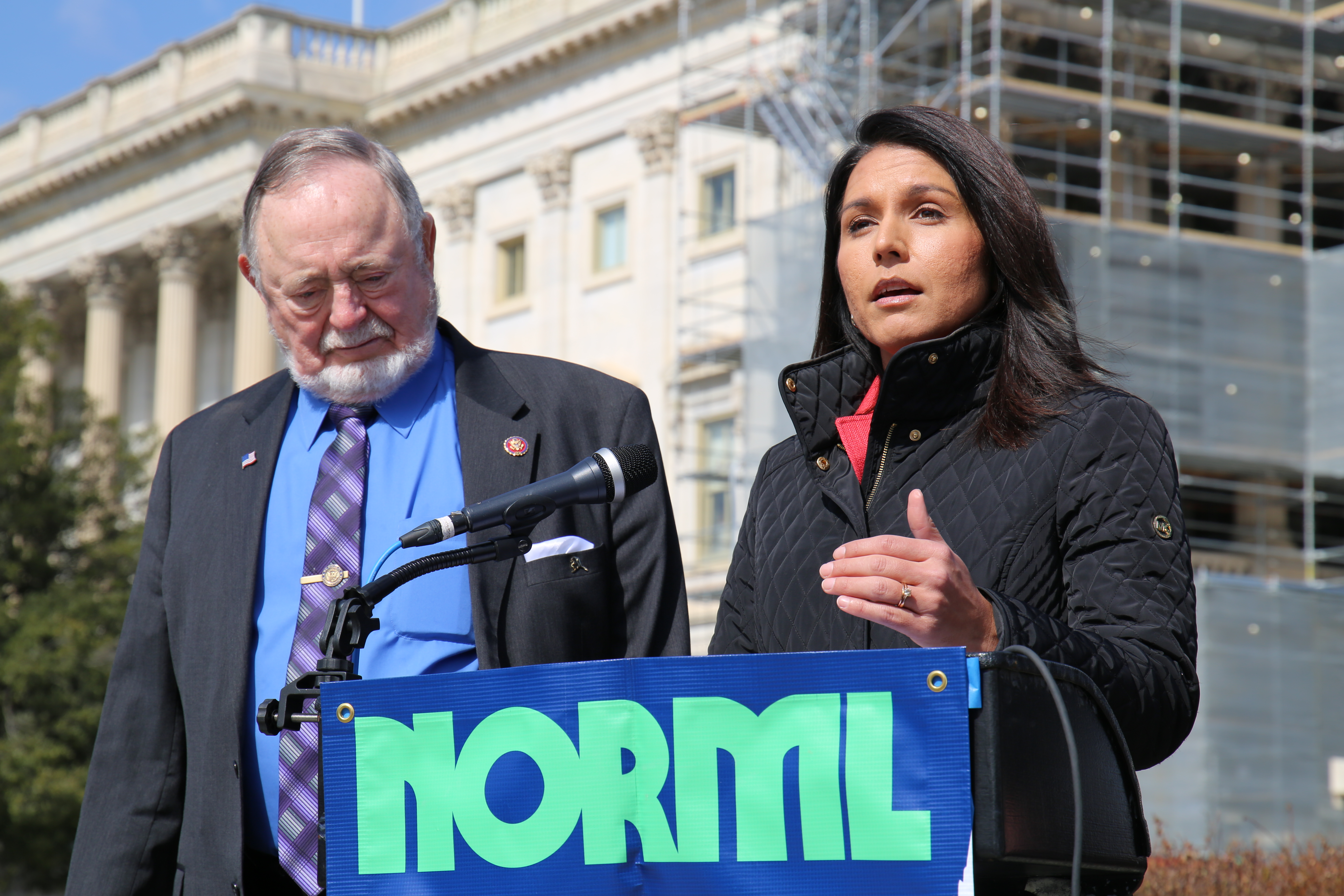
Gabbard speaking in support of the Ending Federal Marijuana Prohibition Act with Rep. Don Young (R-AK) in 2019

Gabbard has been outspoken against a "broken criminal justice system" that puts "people in prison for smoking marijuana" while allowing pharmaceutical corporations responsible for "opioid-related deaths of thousands to walk away scot-free with their coffers full". Gabbard has said that as president she would "end the failed war on drugs, legalize marijuana, end cash bail, and ban private prisons". Bills she has introduced include the Ending Federal Marijuana Prohibition Act and the Marijuana Opportunity Reinvestment and Expungement (MORE) Act.

In January 2020, in response to a question from a voter, Gabbard called for legalizing and regulating all drugs, citing Portugal's model for drug decriminalization. In June 2020, Gabbard introduced an amendment to the House version of the 2021 NDAA to allow members of Armed Services to use products containing CBD and other hemp derivatives. It was approved 336 to 71 as a package, although House leaders did not fight for its inclusion in the final bill.

=== Immigration ===
Gabbard along with 47 other Democrats expressed support in 2015 for increased border security and voted with Republicans for vetting of Iraqi and Syrian refugees. At the time, she called for halting the visa waiver program after mass numbers of Syrian immigrants entered Germany, until the threat of terrorist attacks was resolved. However, between 2013 and 2021, Gabbard had also expressed support for an easier path to citizenship for immigrants without legal status, increasing skilled immigration, and granting work visas to immigrants. By 2022, she said she would be open to a proposal for a border wall if experts say it is warranted.

=== Environment ===
Gabbard has often supported the causes of Native Americans and tribal lands, such as her support for the Standing Rock Sioux Tribe against the construction of the controversial Dakota Access Pipeline in 2016, wherein she co-signed a letter requesting the Obama administration address the tribe's concerns about the project. Gabbard successfully passed an amendment to the 2019 National Defense Authorization Act that would require the Department of Energy to reexamine the safety of the Runit Dome, a leaking Cold War-era nuclear waste site in the Marshall Islands. She later called for "fresh eyes" to ensure a more independent assessment of the waste site's safety.

Gabbard has spoken in favor of a Green New Deal but expressed concerns about vagueness in some proposed versions of the legislation and its inclusion of nuclear energy. She advocated her own "Off Fossil Fuels for a Better Future Act" ("OFF Act") as legislation to transition the United States to renewable energy.

=== Healthcare ===
Gabbard supported a national healthcare insurance program to cover uninsured, as well as under-insured people, and allowed supplemental but not duplicative private insurance. She has since advocated for a two-tier universal health care plan that she calls "Single Payer Plus", loosely modeled after Australia's system and allowing for both supplementary and duplicative private insurance.

Gabbard pushed to reinstate Medicaid eligibility for people from the Marshall Islands, Micronesia and Palau working and living in the United States. She has called for addressing the national nursing shortage.

=== Food and agriculture ===
Gabbard supports clear GMO labeling, voting in 2016 against a GMO-labeling bill she said was too weak. She has supported efforts to reduce routine antibiotic use in livestock and promote organic farming.

Gabbard has expressed concern over farmer bankruptcies and declining farm incomes, particularly in the context of the China–United States trade war. In 2019, she stated that she supports a moratorium on the construction and expansion of concentrated animal feeding operations, sometimes referred to as factory farms.

=== First impeachment of Donald Trump ===
Gabbard voted "present" when the House of Representatives voted to impeach President Trump in December 2019. In two video messages and a press release, she cited The Federalist Papers essay No. 65, and described her vote as a protest against "a political zero-sum game". Gabbard introduced H. Res. 766, which would censure Trump for several of his foreign policy decisions and "send a strong message to this president and future presidents that their abuses of power will not go unchecked, while leaving the question of removing Trump from office to the voters to decide". A week later, Gabbard said she had serious concerns that the impeachment would increase the likelihood that her party would lose the presidential election and its majority in the House of Representatives.

=== LGBTQ rights ===
Gabbard's views on LGBTQ rights have changed over the years, as evidenced by her 2013 signing of an amicus brief supporting gay marriage, while in her early years she was associated with her father's campaign opposing gay marriage. In 1998, when she was 17 years old, Gabbard supported her father's successful campaign to amend the Constitution of Hawaii to give lawmakers the power to "reserve marriage to opposite-sex couples". She also favored the Federal Marriage Amendment that would prevent overriding state law with regard to same-sex marriage.

In 2012, Gabbard apologized for her "anti-gay advocacy" and said she would "fight for the repeal" of the Defense of Marriage Act (DOMA). In June 2013, she was an initial cosponsor of the legislation to repeal DOMA. Gabbard was a member of the House LGBT Equality Caucus. She received ratings of 92%, 88%, 100%, and 84% for her four congressional terms for pro-LGBT legislation from the Human Rights Campaign, a group that advocates for LGBT rights. After launching her presidential campaign in 2019, Gabbard apologized for her past anti-gay views and said that her views had been changed by her experience in the military "with LGBTQ service members, both here at home and while deployed". After criticism from Democrats over her past anti-LGBTQ remarks, she was defended by conservative pundit Tucker Carlson, journalist Glenn Greenwald, and openly gay representative Sean Patrick Maloney.

In 2020, Gabbard and Republican U.S. representative Markwayne Mullin introduced a bill titled the "Protect Women's Sports Act" that would seek to define Title IX protections on the basis of an individual's biological sex. (Note: The bill would make it a violation for institutions that receive federal funding to "permit a person whose biological sex at birth is male to participate in an athletic program or activity that is designated for women or girls". If passed, this bill would effectively ban many transgender athletes from participating in programs corresponding with their gender identity.) After introducing the bill, Gabbard was condemned by activists and LGBTQ organizations, including the Human Rights Campaign, which said: "Gabbard has lost all credibility as an ally."

In 2022, Gabbard endorsed the Florida Parental Rights in Education Act, which prohibits public schools in Florida from having "classroom discussion" or giving "classroom instruction" about sexual orientation or gender identity from kindergarten through third grade or in any manner deemed to be against state standards in all grades. She said the bill "bans government and government schools from indoctrinating woke sexual values in our schools to a captive audience". She also suggested that the bill should apply to all grades.

== Foreign policy positions ==
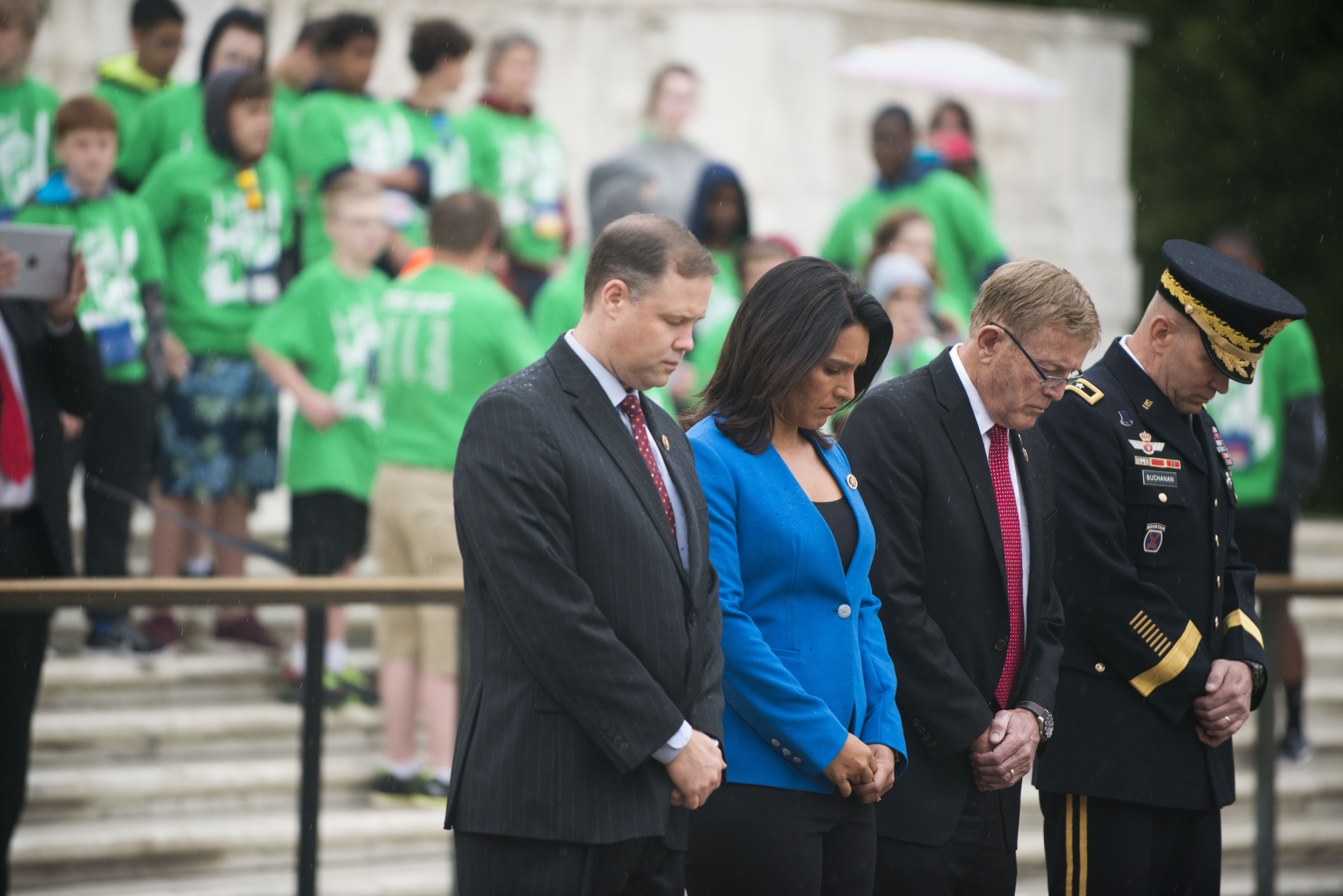
Gabbard at the Tomb of the Unknown Soldier at Arlington National Cemetery in Virginia

In her foreign policy positions, Gabbard has taken a strong stand against Islamist militancy in the Middle East and endorsed tough actions against Al Qaeda and the Islamic State. Gabbard has been a strong supporter of the US military offensive to defeat ISIS. In 2016, Gabbard described herself as a hawk "when it comes to the war against terrorists", but a dove "when it comes to counterproductive wars of regime change". Gabbard has called for ending "our interventionist foreign policy of carrying out regime change wars".

=== Iran's nuclear program ===
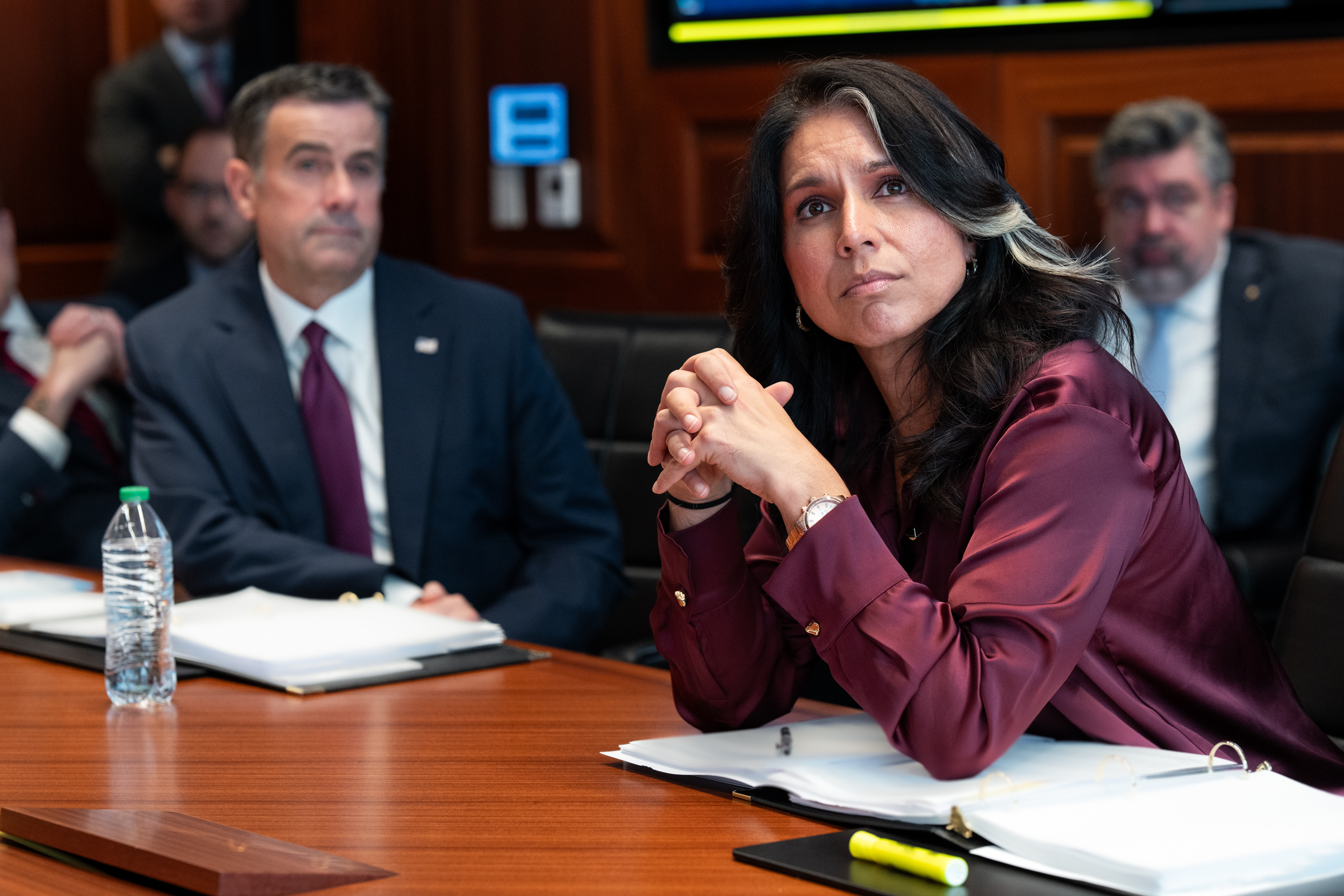
Gabbard and CIA Director John Ratcliffe (left) in the Situation Room during the U.S. bombing of Iranian nuclear sites in June, 2025

In March 2026, Gabbard stated that Iran posed a long-term threat because it could combine its space program with its ballistic missile program to develop an ICBM “before 2035.”

Earlier in 2025, Gabbard revised her position on Iran's nuclear weapon program after facing criticism from President Trump over her March 2025 assertion, which suggested that Iran was not close to building a nuclear weapon. In March 2025, Gabbard testified before Congress that the US intelligence community "continues to assess Iran is not building a nuclear weapon", though she raised concerns that Iran's enriched uranium stockpile was "unprecedented for a state without nuclear weapons". In June 2025, Gabbard clarified her position on Iran's nuclear weapons stating that she agrees with President Trump that Iran could build a nuclear weapon in weeks, and blamed the media for taking her March testimony "out of context". Gabbard posted that "America has intelligence that Iran is at the point that it can produce a nuclear weapon within weeks to months.”

Gabbard also supported the Trump administration's claim of significant damage to Iran's nuclear sites in June 2025 US strikes, and countered media reports of limited damage, which were based on a preliminary defence intelligence assessment. Gabbard said that “New intelligence confirms what President Trump has stated numerous times: Iran’s nuclear facilities have been destroyed.” Gabbard further said that "If the Iranians chose to rebuild, they would have to rebuild all three facilities (Natanz, Fordow, Esfahan) entirely, which would likely take years to do."

=== International missile threats ===
In March 2026, Gabbard presented her annual threat assessment report before the Senate Intelligence Committee, noting that "Russia, China, Iran, North Korea, and Pakistan" were researching and developing advanced missile delivery systems with nuclear and conventional payloads, that put "our homeland within range”. Analysts noted that Gabbard placed Pakistan alongside traditional US adversaries Russia, China, North Korea and Iran among the countries whose missile capabilities could possibly threaten the US.

Further, on weapons of mass destruction, Gabbard assessed that China, North Korea, Russia, and Pakistan would “probably continue to research, develop, and field delivery systems that will increase their ranges and accuracy, challenge US missile defenses, and provide new WMD-use options”.

=== Middle East: Israel and Palestine ===
After Hamas' October 7, 2023, attack on Israel, Gabbard came out strongly in support of Israel and condemned Hamas, calling it an Islamist terrorist organization. In November 2023, she attended the March for Israel at the National Mall in Washington, D.C.

She has called pro-Palestine protesters in the U.S. "puppets of a radical Islamist organization". Gabbard is opposed to a ceasefire in Gaza. In an interview uploaded to YouTube in February, she called Hamas a "threat that needs to be defeated militarily and ideologically". When asked what she thought about the U.S. supporting a U.N. resolution that seeks a ceasefire in Gaza, Gabbard said it needs to be approached strategically. "We have to be realists about the threat that continues to exist for the people of Israel. So as long as Hamas is in power, the people of Israel will not be secure and cannot live in peace."

=== Islamist militancy (al-Qaeda, ISIS); Egypt's Sisi; Iran ===
During her time in U.S. Congress, Gabbard took strong stances in opposition to Islamist political movements and organizations in the Middle East. In some of her appearances on Fox News between 2013 and 2017, she faulted President Obama over his refusal to refer to the Islamic State's beliefs and terrorism as "Islamic extremism" or "radical Islam". In a 2015 interview with CNN's Wolf Blitzer, Gabbard criticized the Obama administration for "refusing" to say that the "real enemy" of the United States is Islamic extremists. Gabbard expressed reservations about the U.S. involvement in Syrian civil war, and said that "We must end our war to overthrow the Syrian government and focus our attention on defeating al-Qaeda and ISIS".

In 2015, Gabbard met with Egyptian dictator 'Abd al-Fattah al-Sisi in Cairo. After the meeting, she issued a statement expressing her commendation of Sisi as a ruler who showed "great courage and leadership" in his regime's war against "Islamist ideology". Her close engagement with Sisi, an Arab autocrat responsible for the killing of more than 800 people in the Rabaa massacre, was met with widespread criticism. Journalist Evan Hill summarized Gabbard's foreign policy as rooted in "authoritarianism cloaked as counter-terrorism, nationalism cloaked as anti-interventionism", and an open espousal of Islamophobia.

On December 20, 2019, the Stop Arming Terrorists Act that she introduced in 2017 became law as part of National Defense Authorization Act for Fiscal Year 2020, § 1228 to prohibit the Department of Defense from "knowingly providing weapons or any other form of support to Al Qaeda" or other terrorist groups or any individual or group affiliated with any such organization. Gabbard was critical of the U.S. military's 2020 Baghdad International Airport airstrike, which targeted and killed high-level Iranian general Qasem Soleimani, as an act of war by U.S. president Donald Trump and a violation of the U.S. Constitution, arguing that Trump did not have congressional authorization for this act.

=== The Assad regime in Syria ===
==== Controversial visit to Syria (2017) ====
In January 2017, Gabbard went on a one-week "fact-finding mission" to Syria and Lebanon, during which she met various political and religious leaders from both countries (Note: Gabbard met with Lebanon's newly-elected President Michel Aoun and Prime Minister Saad Hariri, Grand Mufti Hassoun, Archbishop Denys Antoine Chahda of Syrian Catholic Church of Aleppo, and U.S. Ambassador to Lebanon Elizabeth Richard, in addition to then-Syrian-president Bashar al-Assad.)–and also had two unplanned meetings with then-Syrian-president Bashar al-Assad. The visit was arranged by two Lebanese American men connected to the Syrian Social Nationalist Party.

The visit came after Gabbard had introduced legislation that would, in her words, "end our country's illegal war to overthrow the Syrian government." The visit was the first by a U.S. lawmaker since Nancy Pelosi in 2007, and made under a travel warning issued by the United States Department of State. As required by House rules, the House Ethics Committee approved the trip. (A State Department official said that, as the trip was private, the department was not involved.) The trip was privately funded by a Cleveland-based Arab American group sympathetic to Assad, but after facing controversy over the trips funding, Gabbard decided to personally reimburse the cost of the trip. As Gabbard explained to CNN's Jake Tapper, "When the opportunity arose to meet with [Assad], I did so because I felt it's important that if we profess to truly care about the Syrian people, about their suffering, then we've got to be able to meet with anyone that we need to if there's a possibility that we could achieve peace. And that's exactly what we've talked about." Regarding the rebel groups she said: "[T]he strongest fighting force on the ground in Syria is al-Nusra or Al Qaeda and ISIS."

After her meeting with Syrian religious leaders, Gabbard said that they called for "an end to foreign support of terrorists who are trying to rid Syria of its secular, pluralistic, free society", however Assad's regime was often ranked in the bottom on international freedom rankings. Gabbard's visit to Assad was generally criticized by both sides of the political spectrum for giving Assad credibility despite the civilian deaths under his regime. A Ron Paul Institute article thanked Gabbard for "seeing through the double-bind foreign policy trap of our bipartisan war policy".

==== Opposition to U.S. military intervention in Syria ====
After a 2017 visit to Syria, Gabbard wrote, "There is no difference between "moderate" rebels and al-Qaeda (al-Nusra) or ISIS—they are all the same. This is a war between terrorists under the command of groups like ISIS and al-Qaeda and the Syrian government." In 2018, Gabbard characterized the U.S. as waging a regime change war in Syria since 2011.

In a February 2019 interview with MSNBC a month after the start of her presidential campaign, she said, "Assad is not the enemy of the United States because Syria does not pose a direct threat to the United States" In a subsequent interview on CNN, she said "There are brutal dictators in the world. Assad of Syria is one of them. That does not mean the United States should be waging regime-change wars around the world."

In August 2019, she said that Assad is "a brutal dictator. Just like Saddam Hussein. Just like Gadhafi in Libya. The reason that I'm so outspoken on this issue of ending these wasteful regime-change wars is because I have seen firsthand this high human cost of war and the impact that it has on my fellow brothers and sisters in uniform."

=== Russian invasion of Ukraine ===
In 2019, Gabbard affirmed on MSNBC's Morning Joe that she views Putin as a U.S. adversary. On February 11, 2022, during the build-up to Russia's invasion of Ukraine, she suggested "President Biden could end this crisis and prevent a war with Russia by... guaranteeing... Ukraine will not become a member of NATO" and that he should do this since it is highly unlikely Ukraine will ever become a member. She expressed skepticism about the motives behind not resolving the issue, blaming "warmongers on both sides in Washington" and suggesting the U.S. might want Russia to invade in order to impose "draconian sanctions" and cement a new Cold War. She criticized this as benefiting "the Military-Industrial Complex that controls so many of our politicians" at the expense of American, Ukrainian, and Russian citizens. On February 13, Gabbard said "It is not in our national security interests for Ukraine to become a member of NATO anyway, so why not give Russia that assurance?"

On February 24, the day Russia invaded Ukraine, Gabbard repeated her point that "this war and suffering could have easily been avoided if Biden Admin/NATO had simply acknowledged Russia's legitimate security concerns".

After the invasion, on February 27, Gabbard advocated for a peaceful resolution through neutrality, "It's time to put geopolitics aside and embrace the spirit of aloha, respect and love, for the Ukrainian people by coming to an agreement that Ukraine will be a neutral country... [T]here would be no Russian or NATO troops on each other's non-Baltic borders. This would allow the Ukrainian people to live in peace." On April 4, 2022, Gabbard tweeted, "President Putin, not only is your brutal attack on Ukraine reprehensible, it has been a huge geopolitical error which has already cost Russia dearly... [I]t is the best interest for the Russian people and the people of Ukraine that you pull your forces out now."

Some lawmakers have accused Gabbard of taking foreign policy positions they saw as sympathetic to Russia, and these positions have often resulted in praise from Russian media. In 2024 the New York Times noted that no evidence has emerged for a connection between Gabbard to any Russian agencies, although her advocacy for improving US diplomatic ties has made her a popular voice in Russian state media.

=== East Asia ===
During her 2020 presidential campaign, Gabbard criticized President Donald Trump's confrontational attitude towards China, instead proposing a cooperative relationship to confront global challenges such as climate change. She opposed Trump's trade war with China, calling his approach "extremely volatile" and having "ravaging and devastating effects" on both manufacturers and farmers, while expressing concern the trade war could eventually lead to a "hot war" with China. She also stated her belief that the trade war has made it more difficult to secure Chinese support over a nuclear deal with North Korea; she said America should work with China on denuclearization of the Korean Peninsula.

In December 2023, Gabbard said that "As we remember Japan's aggression in the Pacific, we need to ask ourselves this question: is the remilitarization of Japan, which is presently underway, truly a good idea? We need to be careful that shortsighted, self-serving leaders do not end up bringing us again face-to-face with a remilitarized Japan".

=== Azerbaijan and Armenia ===
Gabbard has often expressed her support for the ethnic Armenian population in the conflict with Azerbaijan. In 2017, she was part of a team of U.S. lawmakers that visited Armenia and the then-disputed breakaway region of Nagorno-Karabakh, which was later reclaimed by Azerbaijan; she was thus blacklisted by Azerbaijan. Later, she accused Turkey of encouraging and inciting 2020 Nagorno-Karabakh conflict between Armenia and Azerbaijan over Nagorno-Karabakh, and co-signed a letter to Secretary of State Mike Pompeo expressing concern over Azerbaijan's renewed aggression against Artsakh (Nagorno Karabakh) and possible conflict with Armenia. Gabbard stated that the United States must urge Azerbaijan to immediately end their attacks, and Turkey to cease its involvement both directly and indirectly.

In 2019, Gabbard was a co-sponsor of the Armenian Genocide Resolution, along with several other U.S. senators and U.S. representatives, to lock in official U.S. recognition and permanent remembrance of the Armenian genocide. While talking about the 1915 mass killings, Gabbard said, "the Ottoman Empire was attempting to cleanse itself of the Armenian and Christian populations, and the US became home to many survivors". Eventually, in 2021, despite opposition by Turkey, President Joe Biden recognized the Ottoman-era mass killings of Armenians as a genocide.

== Personal life ==
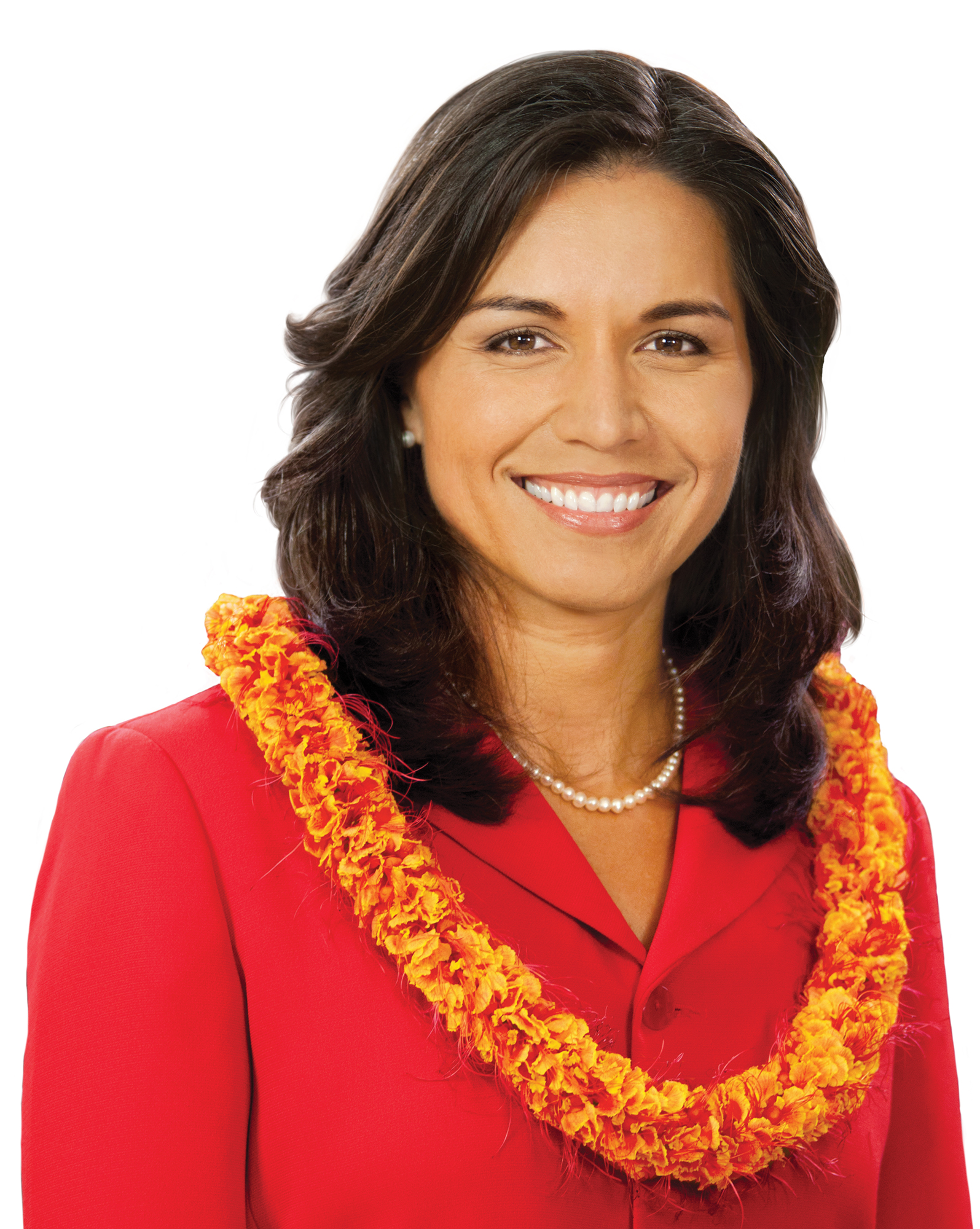
Gabbard in 2012, pictured wearing a lei, the traditional neckwear common among Hawaiian and other Polynesian cultures

Gabbard lived in Hawaii for most of her early childhood and has been a lifelong surfer. A yoga enthusiast, she regularly practices morning yoga and meditation. She has talked about being a vegetarian, although some sources have reported her as being vegan. According to Gabbard, she grew up with Hindu values. She follows the Vaishnava tradition of the Hindu faith, and values as her spiritual guide the Bhagavad Gita. She has said that she is a Karma Yogi (action-oriented Yogi). She took the oath of office in 2013 with her personal copy of the Bhagavad Gita.

Gabbard's parents have been associated with the Science of Identity Foundation (SIF), a Vaishnava affiliated organization. When Gabbard's parents moved to Hawaii, they had joined the circle of disciples around the founder of the SIF connected with International Society for Krishna Consciousness, She described the SIF's leader, Chris Butler, as a guide/spiritual leader and "essentially like a Vaishnava Hindu pastor" during her early years. Butler has in return likened her to a star pupil. In 2024, the Trump transition team said that Gabbard has "no affiliation" with the SIF.

Gabbard's mother became Hindu and gave Sanskrit names to all her children. Gabbard is named after tulasi, a sacred plant in Hinduism. She has three brothers–Jay, Bhakti, and Aryan–and a sister, Vrindavan, a US Marshal. Gabbard has often mentioned that the teachings of selfless action from the Bhagavad Gita motivated her towards social work. Later in 2014, as a Congresswoman, she also presented a copy of the Bhagavad Gita to Indian Prime Minister Narendra Modi, on the latter's visit to the United States. Gabbard supported the efforts of Modi for declaration of an International Yoga Day by the United Nations.

Among other activities in D.C., Gabbard has been participating in the celebration of Diwali, the Hindu festival of lights, along with members from the Hindu American community. In 2016, she supported the campaign by Hindu Americans for a Diwali commemorative stamp in the United States, noting that the Diwali festival honors values such as righteousness "that transcend different religions, and backgrounds."

Earlier in 2002, at the age of 21, Gabbard married Eduardo Tamayo. She was deployed to Iraq from 2004 to 2005, serving with the National Guard. They divorced in 2006. Gabbard said in 2012 that the divorce illustrated "the stresses war places on military spouses and families." In 2015, Gabbard and freelance cinematographer and editor Abraham Williams, a Hindu of European and Samoan ancestry and son of her Honolulu office manager, married in a traditional Vedic Hindu wedding. While on Meghan McCain's podcast in 2024, Gabbard mentioned that she and Williams had tried to start a family and had undergone several in-vitro fertilization (IVF) procedures, without success.

In 2024, Gabbard and her husband bought a house near Austin, Texas, and claimed a homestead tax exemption. But in November 2024 she voted as a Hawaii resident, and in early 2025, her attorneys said that she "was, is, and intends to remain a Hawaii resident." In late May 2026, when Gabbard submitted her resignation as DNI, she cited her husband's recent diagnosis of "an extremely rare form of bone cancer". In June 2026, Gabbard said that her husband's surgery was successful, and the recovery therapies had begun.

== Military awards and decorations ==
- Army Combat Medical Badge
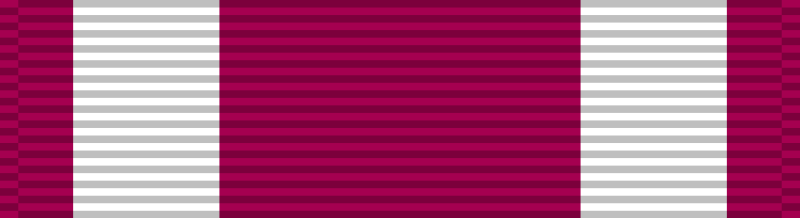
- Meritorious Service Medal
- Army Commendation Medal with Oak Leaf Cluster
- Army Achievement Medal with Oak Leaf Cluster
- Army Good Conduct Medal
- National Defense Service Medal
- Iraq Campaign Medal with Bronze Star
- Global War on Terrorism Expeditionary Medal
- Global War on Terrorism Service Medal
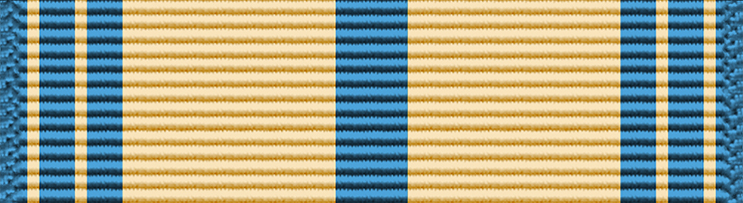
- Armed Forces Reserves Service Medal with M device
- Army Service Ribbon
- Army Overseas Service Ribbon
- Army Overseas Reserve Training Ribbon
- German Armed Forces Badge for Military Proficiency in Gold

== Awards and honors ==
On November 25, 2013, Gabbard received the John F. Kennedy New Frontier Award from the Institute of Politics at Harvard Kennedy School for her efforts on behalf of veterans. On March 20, 2014, Elle magazine honored her and others, at the Italian Embassy in the United States during its annual "Women in Washington Power List".

On February 26, 2015, Gabbard received the County Alumni Award from the National Association of Counties for her "steadfast commitment to the nation's counties". On July 15, 2015, she received the Friend of the National Parks Award from the National Parks Conservation Association.

On September 30, 2018, Gabbard received the Ho'ola Na Pua Advocacy Award for "her dedication to serving and empowering human trafficking survivors in Hawaii" at their annual Pearl Gala. On October 16, 2018, Gabbard was honored as Hawaii Pacific University's 2018 Paul T. C. Loo Distinguished Alumni. The Second Amendment Institute awarded the Champion's Award to Tulsi Gabbard on June 20, 2024, at Second Amendment Institute's Annual Champion Ceremony in Washington, DC.

== Published works ==
- Gabbard, Tulsi (2024). For Love of Country: Leave the Democrat Party Behind. Skyhorse Publishing. ISBN 9781684514854.
- Gabbard, Tulsi (2021). Is Today the Day? (Edition-II). Grand Central Publishing. ISBN 9781455542321.
- Gabbard, Tulsi (2019). Is Today the Day?. Grand Central Publishing. ISBN 9781455542314.

== See also ==
- List of Asian Americans and Pacific Islands Americans in the United States Congress
- List of female United States presidential and vice presidential candidates
- List of Hindu members of the United States Congress
- Women in the United States House of Representatives

== Notes ==
U.S. House of Representatives
Preceded by Mazie Hirono	Member of the U.S. House of Representatives from Hawaii's 2nd congressional district 2013–2021	Succeeded by Kai Kahele
Political offices
Preceded by Avril Haines	Director of National Intelligence; 2025–2026	Succeeded by Bill Pulte; Acting
U.S. order of precedence (ceremonial)
Preceded by Dan Boren as Former U.S. Representative	Order of precedence of the United States as Former U.S. Representative	Succeeded by Thomas B. Evans Jr. as Former U.S. Representative
