= NICC (disambiguation) =

NICC is Northeast Iowa Community College.

NICC may also refer to:

- National Intelligence Coordination Center, a center established by US Director of National Intelligence
- Nebraska Indian Community College
- Noor Islamic Cultural Center, a mosque in Columbus, Ohio
- Northern Ireland Constitutional Convention
- National Interagency Coordination Center, a tenant of the US National Interagency Fire Center
- National Interfaith Cable Coalition, the founder of Vision Interfaith Satellite Network in 1987
- National Interoperability Consultative Committee, an organisation in the UK telecommunications sector
- Nationaal Instituut voor Criminalistiek en Criminologie, Belgian government agency
- 6-hydroxynicotinate 3-monooxygenase, an enzyme
