= Orwig =

Orwig is a surname. Notable people with the surname include:

- Bernice Orwig (born 1976), American water polo player
- Bill Orwig (1907–1994), American football and basketball player
- Matthew D. Orwig (born 1959), American attorney
- William W. Orwig (1810–1889), American Evangelical bishop
