= Thomas H. Haines =

American author, biochemist and academic (1933–2023)

- Born: Thomas Henry Haines; August 9, 1933; New York, U.S.
- Died: December 17, 2023 (aged 90); New York, U.S.
- Education: City College of New York (BS, MS); Rutgers University (PhD)
- Occupations: Author; biochemist; educator
- Spouses: Adrienne Rappaport (m. 1960; died 1985) Mary Cleveland (m. 1986)
- Children: Avril Haines
- Website: thomashaines.org

Thomas Henry Haines (August 9, 1933 – December 17, 2023) was an American author, social activist, biochemist and academic. He was a professor of chemistry at City College of New York and of biochemistry at the Sophie Davis School of Biomedical Education. He was a visiting professor in the Laboratory of Thomas Sakmar at Rockefeller University. He also served on the board of the Graham School, a social services and foster care agency in New York City. His scientific research focused on the structure and function of the living cell membrane. He is the father of Avril Haines, the seventh Director of National Intelligence.

== Early life and education ==
Thomas Haines was born on August 9, 1933, to Elsie Cubbon Haines (1894–1955) and Charles Haines, who deserted when Haines was two. In 1937, "by reason of the insanity of the mother", a judge placed him at the Graham School, an orphanage in Hastings-on-Hudson, New York. The orphanage, now a social services and foster care agency, was founded in 1806 by Isabella Graham and Elizabeth Hamilton, the recently widowed wife of Alexander Hamilton. Haines remained at the orphanage until high school, when he became a resident houseboy and gardener for a wealthy Hastings family. The story of Haines' early life appears as "From the Orphanage to the Lab" in the Story Collider podcast. and in his autobiography with Mindy Lewis, A Curious Life: From Rebel Orphan to Innovative Scientist.

Haines attended the City College of New York, with a B.S. in chemistry in 1957 and an M.S. in education in 1959. During that time he worked as live-in baby sitter for then-blacklisted American songwriter Jay Gorney (co-writer with Yip Harburg of the Depression era anthem, “Brother, Can You Spare a Dime?”) and his wife Sondra. There Haines came to know many other blacklisted professionals including actors Zero Mostel, Paul Robeson, and Lionel Stander, philosopher Barrows Dunham, and Bella Abzug, then a young lawyer defending blacklisted artists and intellectuals at HUAC hearings.

== Career ==
After CCNY, Haines taught elementary school science at the Ethical Culture Fieldston School. He then became a laboratory assistant to Richard Block at the Boyce Thompson Institute where he studied the microorganism Ochromonas danica. When Block died in a plane crash, Haines took over his research projects. In 1964 he obtained his Doctor of Philosophy degree in chemistry from Rutgers University.

Haines became assistant professor of chemistry at City College in 1964 and full professor of chemistry in 1972, a position he held until retiring in 2007. In 1972 he co-founded the Sophie Davis School of Biomedical Education with University President Robert Marshak. This remarkable program took new undergraduates directly into medical school. It continues today as The CUNY School of Medicine. Haines taught biochemistry to undergraduates and served as director of biochemistry at the school from 1974 to 2006. Deeply committed to his students, he also taught remedial summer school and regularly counseled struggling students and their parents. On many occasions he was voted most popular professor.

Haines simultaneously conducted laboratory research and taught as professor of biochemistry in the doctoral program of biochemistry at the Graduate Center of the City University of New York. He has published extensively on the structure and function of living membranes, including on the function of cholesterol in blocking sodium leakage through membranes, and most recently on the function of cardiolipin in the mitochondrial membrane.

From 1994 to 2001, Haines chaired the Partnership for Responsible Drug Information, which organized lectures and conferences to educate the public about alternatives to the "War on Drugs."

Haines served as visiting professor at the Mitsubishi Institute in Japan, at the University of California at Berkeley, and in many other universities. On his retirement from CCNY, he became a visiting professor of biochemistry at the Sakmar Laboratory at Rockefeller University.

In 2020, Haines was elected a Fellow of the American Association for the Advancement of Science "For initiating and setting up the CUNY Medical School at City College of New York to educate minority and disadvantaged students."

== Personal life ==
In 1960, Haines married painter Adrienne Rappaport, who used the name Adrian Rappin professionally. They had one daughter, Avril Haines, an attorney who is serving as the current Director of National Intelligence in the Biden administration. Rappaport died in 1985 after developing chronic obstructive pulmonary disease and later contracting avian tuberculosis.

In 1986, Haines married his current wife, economist Mary "Polly" Cleveland.

In 1964, Haines and Rappaport purchased two small run-down rent-controlled apartment buildings on New York's Upper West Side for $140,000, $10,000 down and for a time employed Al Pacino as the building superintendent. When Haines and Cleveland sold the buildings for many millions of dollars in 2009, they put half the net proceeds into a foundation for the benefit of scientific and economic education.

Haines died in New York on December 17, 2023, at the age of 90.
