= Deirdre Walsh =

American public servant

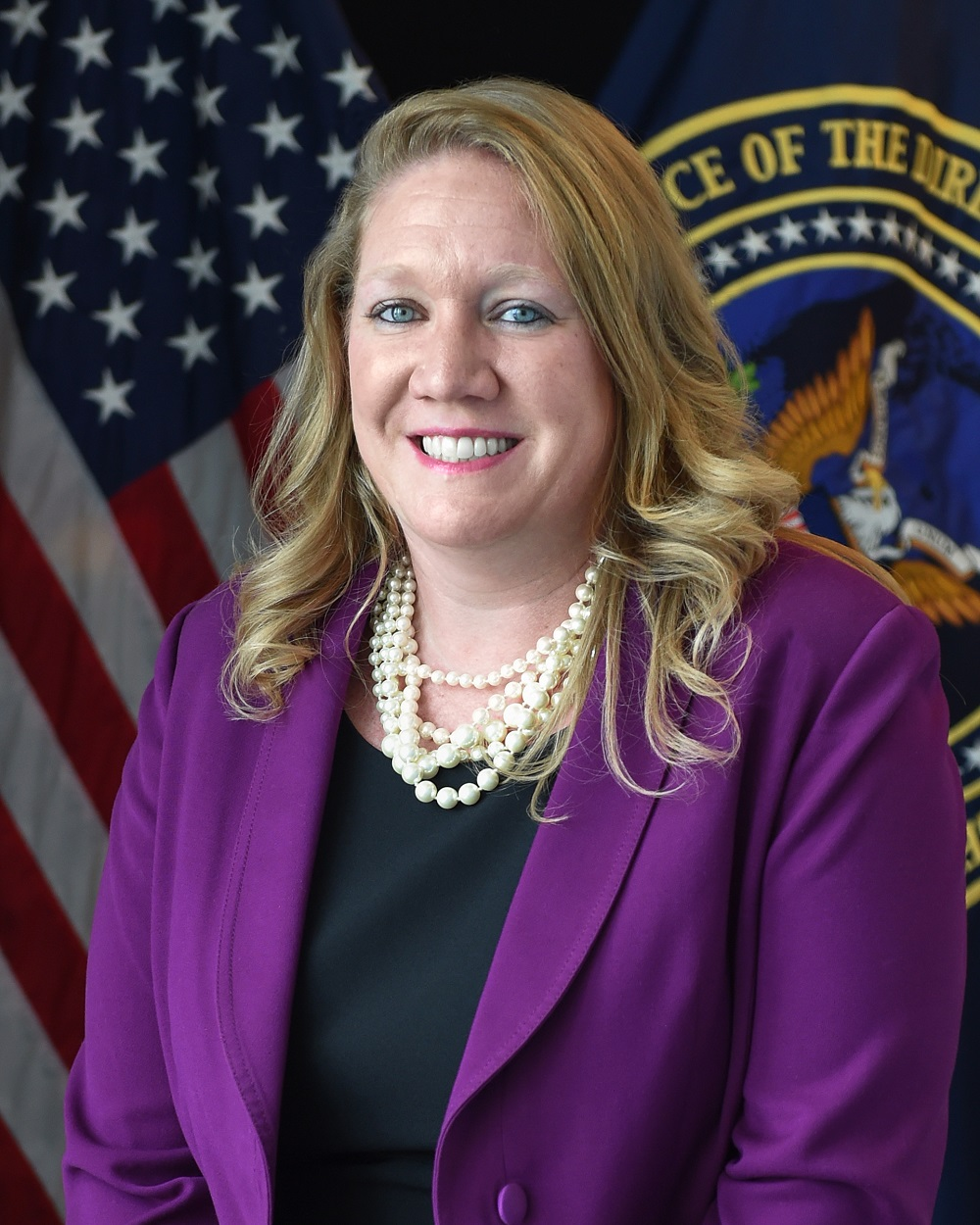

Chief Operating Officer for the Office of the Director of National Intelligence
- In office February 2018 – May 2020
- President: Donald Trump
- Preceded by: Position established
- Succeeded by: Lora Shiao

Personal details
- Education: George Washington University; University of Scranton

Deirdre M. Walsh is the Executive Vice President for Strategy and Government Affairs for ARKA Group. Previous to ARKA, she served as Vice President of Strategic Operations for Ball Aerospace & Technologies. Previously as a federal government employee and member of the United States Intelligence Community, she served as the first chief operating officer (COO) for the Office of the Director of National Intelligence (ODNI) from February 2018 to May 2020.

From 2014 to 2018, Walsh was director of legislative affairs for the ODNI. In this position, she managed ODNI's interaction with Congress, supported Congressional oversight requirements, and advised ODNI senior leaders on Congressional priority interests. Walsh was appointed to the Senior National Intelligence Service in June 2013, and has been employed by the ODNI for more than ten years.

She was previously deputy director of Congressional and public affairs at the National Reconnaissance Office (NRO).

Preceding her assignment to NRO, she supported the assistant director of national intelligence/chief financial officer in the Performance and Budget Justification Group at ODNI. Her responsibilities included the National Intelligence Program (NIP) Congressional Budget Justification, as well as related DNI testimony development, Intelligence Community (IC) coordination, and legislative analysis.

From 2008 to 2009, Walsh provided strategic counsel and support for efforts to revise Executive Order 12333, entitled “United States Intelligence Activities,” and served as director of Policy Management during the stand-up of the Office of the Assistant Deputy DNI for Policy. From 2005 to 2008, Walsh worked as a legislative liaison officer in the ODNI Office of Legislative Affairs, with primary responsibility for the communication and defense of the NIP budget request.

Before joining the ODNI, Walsh was house liaison for the 2005 Defense Base Closure and Realignment Commission, with responsibility for all Commission interaction with the U.S. House of Representatives. Walsh also served on the legislative staffs of Representative Sherwood Boehlert and Representative Felix J. Grucci, Jr.

Walsh credits her college basketball coach, Mike Strong, with her propensity for Intelligence who always told her to "use her head for the elements of defense."

Walsh holds a Master of Arts in legislative affairs from the George Washington University, and a Bachelor of Science in international studies from the University of Scranton, Pennsylvania. She resides in Washington, D.C.
