= Lora Shiao =

American intelligence officer

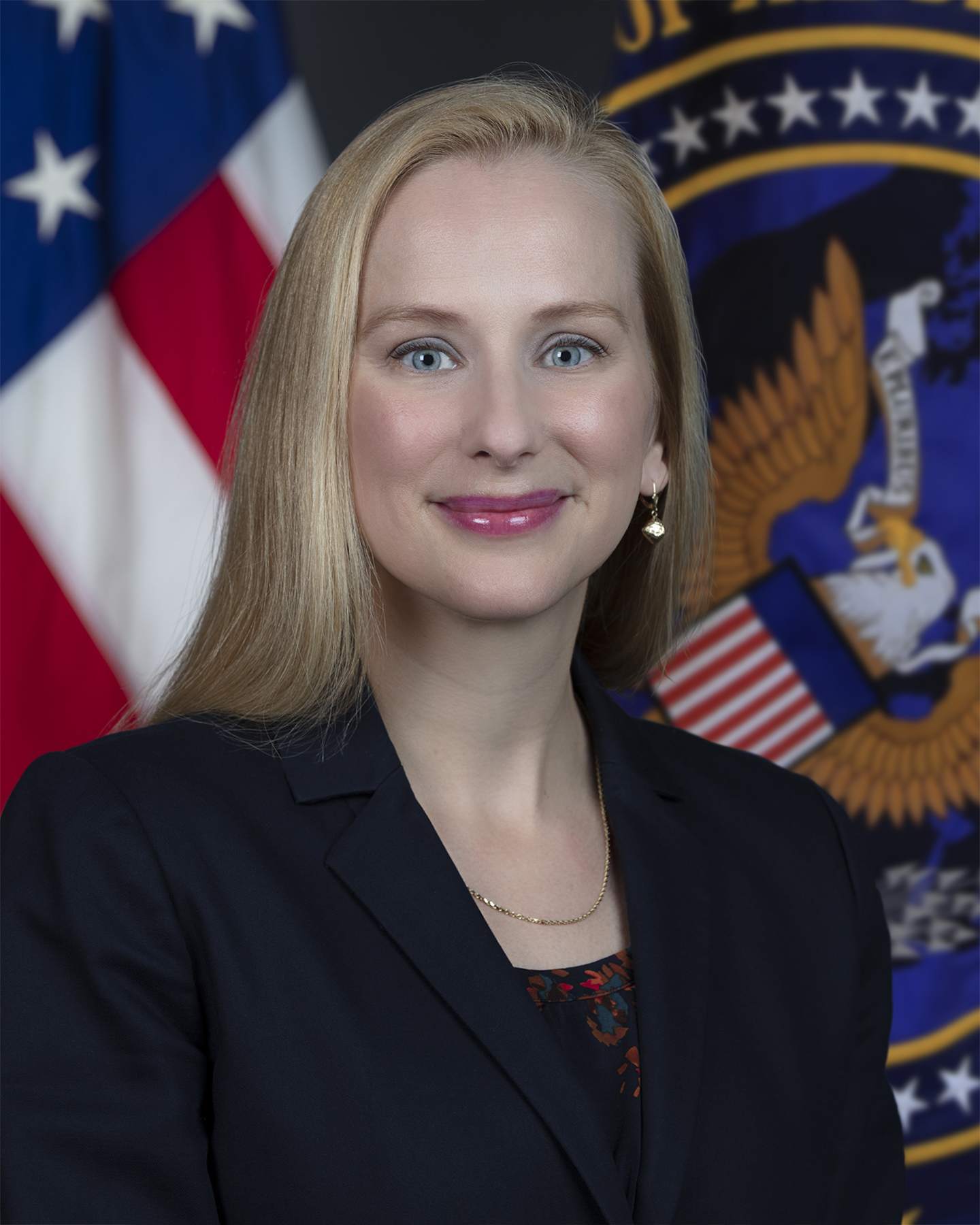
- Official portrait, 2019

Chief Operating Officer for the Office of the Director of National Intelligence
- In office October 2020 – September 2025
- President: Donald Trump; Joe Biden; Donald Trump
- Preceded by: Deirdre Walsh
- Succeeded by: Dennis Kirk

Acting Director of National Intelligence
- In office January 25, 2025 – February 12, 2025
- President: Donald Trump
- Preceded by: Stacey Dixon (acting)
- Succeeded by: Tulsi Gabbard
- In office January 20, 2021 – January 21, 2021
- President: Joe Biden
- Preceded by: Neil Wiley (acting)
- Succeeded by: Avril Haines

Acting Director of the National Counterterrorism Center
- In office April 3, 2020 – August 10, 2020
- President: Donald Trump
- Preceded by: Russell Travers (acting)
- Succeeded by: Christopher C. Miller

Lora Shiao is an American government official who had served as the chief operating officer for the Office of the Director of National Intelligence. She briefly served as acting director of national intelligence from January 25, 2025, to February 12, 2025, and had also held this position for a short time from January 20–21, 2021.

== Career ==
Shiao served as an intelligence briefer to the United States attorney general and Director of the Federal Bureau of Investigation from 2005 to 2007.

She was appointed to the senior national intelligence service within the National Counterterrorism Center (NCTC) in May 2014. She was Deputy Director for Terrorist Identities during 2015–2016, where supported whole-of-government action in the identities intelligence mission space. As Deputy Director for Intelligence during 2016–2019, she led the NCTC's all-source analysis of the capabilities and intentions of terrorist actors worldwide to inform national policymakers and support the efforts of the intelligence community, military, law enforcement, and homeland security partners.

Shiao was NCTC's Executive Director from March 2019 to April 2020, a role in which she managed the center's financial and personnel operations and helped drive information technology innovation. Shiao then served as Deputy Director of the NCTC from April to October 2020. During this time, Shiao was Acting Director of the NCTC from April 3 to August 10, 2020, when she was replaced by Christopher C. Miller.

Shiao was named Chief Operating Officer for the Office of the Director of National Intelligence (ODNI) in October 2020. In this capacity, Shiao was responsible for the strategic management of the ODNI, including corporate governance, financial operations, information management, information technology, security and counterintelligence, continuity of operations, facilities and logistics, and talent management.

Political offices
| Preceded by Neil Wiley; Acting | Director of National Intelligence; Acting; 2021 | Succeeded by Avril Haines |
| Preceded by Stacey Dixon; Acting | Director of National Intelligence; Acting; 2025 | Succeeded by Tulsi Gabbard |
