= Catherine Marsh (chemist) =

American chemist and government official

- Born: Catherine Loretta Marsh; October 3, 1960 (age 66); Springfield, Massachusetts, U.S.
- Education: Brown University
- Scientific career
- Fields: Inorganic and analytical chemistry
- Workplaces: Central Intelligence Agency; Intelligence Advanced Research Projects Activity
- Doctoral advisor: John O. Edwards

Catherine Marsh (born October 3, 1960) is an American inorganic chemist and former government official specializing in power sources like lithium-ion technology. She was the fifth director of Intelligence Advanced Research Projects Activity from 2019 to 2024. Marsh was previously the Central Intelligence Agency's chief scientist.

== Early life and education ==
Catherine Loretta Marsh was born on October 3, 1960 in Springfield, Massachusetts to schoolteachers Joan Czaja and George F. Marsh Jr. In 1978, she graduated summa cum laude from Classical High School.

As an undergraduate at Brown University, Marsh researched alcohol exchange reaction of Trimethoxyarsenite under professor John O. Edwards. During this time, she was a resident counselor and chemistry teaching assistant. In 1982, Marsh earned her Sc.B. in chemistry. After graduation, she began working as a research assistant for Aaron Wold investigating catalysts used in the Fischer-Tropsch coal gasification reaction.

By 1987, Marsh lived in Fall River, Massachusetts. That same year, completed a Ph.D. degree in inorganic and analytical chemistry. Her dissertation was titled "The Aqueous Chemistry of Peroxyacids." Edwards was her doctoral advisor. She is a member of Sigma Xi.

== Career ==
In industry, Marsh led the team that put lithium-ion technology on various platforms, including the Mars rovers Spirit and Opportunity.

In 2001, Marsh joined the Central Intelligence Agency as a senior scientist developing power solutions for systems that support operations. She served as the director of the power sources center in the Directorate of Science and Technology (DS&T), where she led a group that provides multi-disciplinary, agile, flexible, and innovative power solutions for the U.S. Intelligence Community.

From 2013 to 2015, Marsh served as the deputy director of the Intelligence Advanced Research Projects Activity (IARPA).

From 2015 to 2016 Marsh held the position of dean of the DS&T George Methlie School where she led the tradecraft education program. Marsh served as the CIA's chief scientist in the DS&T where she was responsible for ensuring that science and technology underlies all present and future DS&T and CIA mission capabilities. She served as the DS&T’s primary science advisor, providing strategic scientific assessments of all DS&T mission programs.

In November 2019, Marsh succeeded Stacey Dixon as the fifth director of IARPA. In 2024, she was succeeded by Richard Muller.
