= John Ratcliffe =

American politician (born 1965)

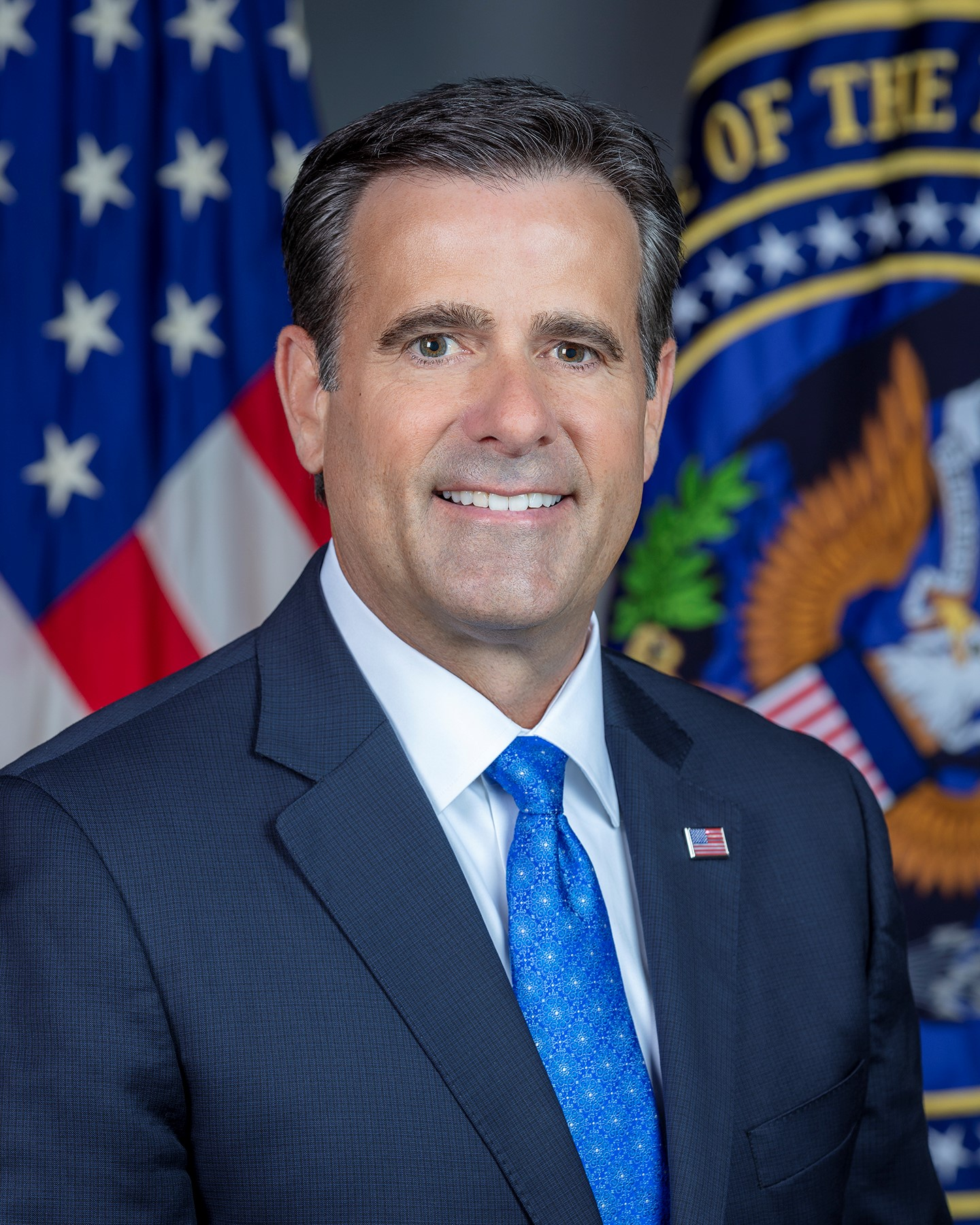
- Official portrait, 2020

9th Director of the Central Intelligence Agency
- Incumbent
- Assumed office January 23, 2025
- President: Donald Trump
- Deputy: Michael Ellis
- Preceded by: Bill Burns

6th Director of National Intelligence
- In office May 26, 2020 – January 20, 2021
- President: Donald Trump
- Deputy: Neil Wiley
- Preceded by: Dan Coats
- Succeeded by: Avril Haines

Member of the U.S. House of Representatives from Texas's 4th district
- In office January 3, 2015 – May 22, 2020
- Preceded by: Ralph Hall
- Succeeded by: Pat Fallon

Mayor of Heath
- In office June 14, 2004 – May 14, 2012
- Preceded by: Chris Cuny
- Succeeded by: Lorne Liechty

Acting United States Attorney for the Eastern District of Texas
- In office May 21, 2007 – May 9, 2008
- President: George W. Bush
- Preceded by: Matthew D. Orwig
- Succeeded by: Rebecca Gregory

Personal details
- Born: John Lee Ratcliffe; October 20, 1965 (age 61) Mount Prospect, Illinois, U.S.
- Party: Republican
- Spouse: Michele Addington
- Children: 2
- Education: University of Notre Dame (BA); Southern Methodist University (JD)
- John Ratcliffe's voice Ratcliffe on extending a federal ban on fentanyl Recorded January 28, 2020

John Lee Ratcliffe (born October 20, 1965) is an American politician and attorney who has served as the director of the Central Intelligence Agency since 2025. Ratcliffe served as the director of national intelligence from 2020 to 2021. A member of the Republican Party, he served as the U.S. representative for Texas's fourth congressional district from 2015 to 2020, as the mayor of Heath, Texas, from 2004 to 2012, and as the acting U.S. attorney for the Eastern District of Texas from 2007 to 2008.

Ratcliffe graduated from the University of Notre Dame with a bachelor's degree in 1986 and from Southern Methodist University's School of Law with a Juris Doctor in 1989. Ratcliffe worked as a lawyer in private practice for fifteen years. In 2004, he was elected to serve as the mayor of Heath, Texas, a position he served in for eight years. That year, he joined the U.S. Attorney's Office for the Eastern District of Texas as the director of anti-terrorism and national security. Ratcliffe worked as an assistant U.S. attorney in the Eastern District. He briefly served as its acting U.S. attorney after Matthew D. Orwig resigned in 2007. In 2009, he established the Ashcroft Law Firm alongside former attorney general John Ashcroft and former U.S. attorney for the Western District of Texas Johnny Sutton.

In 2013, Ratcliffe announced his candidacy in the 2014 United States House of Representatives election for Texas's fourth congressional district. He defeated Ralph Hall, who had served as the district's representative for nearly thirty years, in a runoff election. Ratcliffe was elected without opposition in 2014; he was reelected in 2016 and 2018. Ratcliffe's performance in challenging legal opponents of President Donald Trump, including the special counsel Robert Mueller, led to Trump nominating Ratcliffe as his director of national intelligence in July 2019. Ratcliffe withdrew his nomination the next month, believing his confirmation to be in question.

In February 2020, Trump nominated Ratcliffe for a second time as the director of national intelligence. His nomination received less criticism amid questions into the origin of SARS-CoV-2 and the recent temporary appointment of Richard Grenell. Ratcliffe was confirmed by the Senate in May. As the director of national intelligence, Ratcliffe halted election briefings for Congress and contradicted public assessments on foreign interference in the 2020 presidential election. He released unverified intelligence that suggested Hillary Clinton had devised a scheme to accuse the Russian government of interfering in the 2016 presidential election.

In November 2024, Trump named Ratcliffe as his nominee for director of the Central Intelligence Agency. Ratcliffe appeared before the Senate Select Committee on Intelligence prior to Trump's second inauguration and was confirmed by the Senate that month. As the director of the Central Intelligence Agency, Ratcliffe pursued mass firings at the agency and engaged in foreign interventions, including expanding the agency's drone incursions into Mexico, providing tactical information that preceded U.S. strikes on Iranian nuclear sites, initiating covert operations in Venezuela, and preparing for U.S. strikes that began the Iran war.

== Early life and education (1965–1989) ==
John Lee Ratcliffe was born in Mount Prospect, Illinois, on October 20, 1965. Ratcliffe had five older siblings. Ratcliffe's parents were school teachers. His father sold cars and educational books to supplement his income. Ratcliffe was raised in Palatine. The Ratcliffes moved to Carbondale after Ratcliffe's father was named the dean of continuing education at Southern Illinois University in 1977. Ratcliffe graduated from Carbondale Community High School in 1983. He graduated from the University of Notre Dame with a bachelor's degree in 1986 and from Southern Methodist University's School of Law with a Juris Doctor in 1989. He met his wife, Michele, at Southern Methodist University; they have two children. Ratcliffe is Catholic.

== Career ==
=== Early work and mayor of Heath (1989–2012) ===
After graduating from Southern Methodist University, Ratcliffe worked as a lawyer, a mediator, and a law professor. In May 2004, Ratcliffe was elected to serve as the mayor of Heath, Texas, winning seventy percent of the vote in a three-way race. He was sworn in the following month. Ratcliffe was re-elected in May 2006 without opposition, as well as in 2008 and 2010. According to the Rockwall County Herald-Banner, Ratcliffe ensured that Heath's tax rate remained constant, and its financial ratings improved. In February 2012, he announced that he would not run for re-election, citing his legal and political engagements. Ratcliffe swore in his successor on May 14.

=== Bush administration positions (2004–2008) ===
In December 2004, Ratcliffe joined the U.S. Attorney's Office for the Eastern District of Texas as the director of anti-terrorism and national security in the Bush administration. He additionally served on the Advisory Subcommittee on National Security within the United States Department of Justice. In January 2005, Ratcliffe was appointed as an assistant U.S. attorney for anti-terrorism. According to The New York Times, Ratcliffe embellished his role in prosecuting terrorism cases. In one case, he claimed that he had tried suspects who allegedly funneled money to Hamas; Ratcliffe had only investigated aspects of the case after a mistrial and did not prosecute either the first or second trials.

In April 2007, Matthew D. Orwig, the U.S. attorney for the Eastern District of Texas, announced that he would leave his position for private practice. The following month, Ratcliffe was sworn in as his acting successor as Orwig's first assistant. He was additionally a candidate to be nominated for the position. Ratcliffe led the prosecution of hundreds of Pilgrim's Pride workers suspected of being illegal immigrants who were arrested in April 2008. He presided over the prosecution of the personal trainer David Jacobs. Ratcliffe resigned the following month after Rebecca Gregory was confirmed to the position. By October 2008, he had become a consultant to the United States government on counterterrorism.

=== Legal and political activities (2009–2014) ===
In April 2009, Ratcliffe established a law firm alongside former attorney general John Ashcroft and former U.S. attorney for the Western District of Texas Johnny Sutton. The firm, operating as the Ashcroft Law Firm in Washington and Ashcroft Sutton and Ratcliffe in Texas, was affiliated with The Ashcroft Group. Prior to the 2012 presidential election, Ratcliffe advised former Massachusetts governor Mitt Romney's transition team on government nominees and appointees.

== U.S. House of Representatives (2015–2020) ==
=== Initial campaign ===
On December 9, 2013, hours before the deadline, Ratcliffe filed as a candidate in the United States House of Representatives election for Texas's fourth congressional district. The Dallas Morning News described Ratcliffe's unexpected candidacy as the "most serious political challenge" to the district's officeholder, Ralph Hall, the oldest person to have ever served in the House of Representatives; according to The Atlantic, John Ashcroft encouraged Ratcliffe to run. Ratcliffe told the News that he would not seek to make Hall's age a significant issue in his campaign, a strategy The New York Times attributed to appealing to older voters. He additionally described himself as Hall's successor to the News. Within a week of declaring his candidacy, Ratcliffe garnered US$50,000 in individual donations.

By January 2014, he had become the most prominent opponent to Hall. That month, Ratcliffe committed over US$400,000 of his personal funds into his campaign. His donor network included former U.S. attorneys for president George W. Bush, and his campaign strategy focused on online marketing and analytics. In the primary election on March 4, Hall and Ratcliffe were forced into a runoff election after neither candidate garnered an outright majority of the vote. Ratcliffe defeated Hall in the runoff election on May 27. In his victory speech, Ratcliffe stated that he would leave office after eight years. He ran unopposed in the general election on November 4.

=== Tenure ===
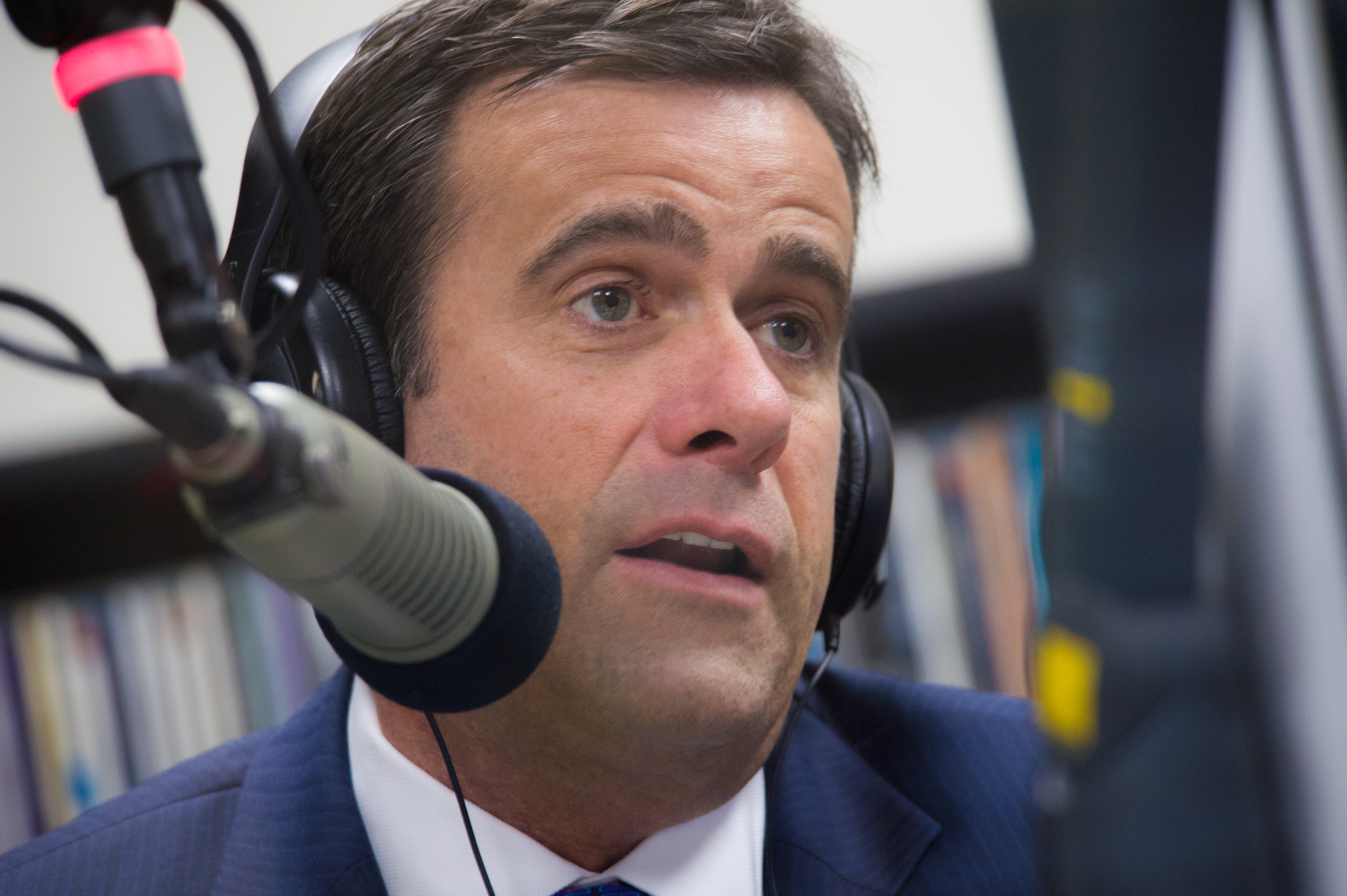
Ratcliffe speaks to KETR in February 2015.

Ratcliffe was sworn in on January 3, 2015. In his tenure, Ratcliffe was involved in various congressional hearings into individuals who conflicted with Trump. He questioned the integrity of Peter Strzok, who led the Federal Bureau of Investigation's counterintelligence investigation into links between associates of president Donald Trump and Russian officials, before the bureau's director, Christopher A. Wray. Ratcliffe later alleged that Strzok and Lisa Page, a bureau official with whom he had an extramarrital affair, had a "manifest bias" against Trump. He offered concerns about Strzok and the special counsel Robert Mueller's response to his apparent impropriety before deputy attorney general Rod Rosenstein.

In the impeachment inquiry into Trump, Ratcliffe emerged as a defender of Trump. As the impeachment trial neared in January 2020, advisors to Trump considered appointing Ratcliffe to formally defend Trump. Ratcliffe had been expected to join Trump's defense team alongside Ohio representative Jim Jordan and Georgia representative Doug Collins until Senate majority leader Mitch McConnell intervened.

=== Committee assignments ===
Ratcliffe was assigned to the House Committees on the Judiciary and on Homeland Security in January 2015. In the latter, he chaired the Subcommittee on Cybersecurity and Infrastructure Protection. Ratcliffe served on the Task Force on Combating Terrorist and Foreign Fighter Travel, a consortium assembled to discuss Americans leaving the United States to fight in the Iraqi and Syrian civil wars. Ratcliffe was named to the House Permanent Select Committee on Intelligence in January 2019.

== Director of National Intelligence (2020–2021) ==
=== First nomination ===
In December 2018, The Washington Post reported that Ratcliffe was among several candidates being considered to succeed Jeff Sessions as attorney general, an indication that he had been supported by allies of president Donald Trump. In July 2019, tensions between Trump and director of national intelligence Dan Coats—who frequently contradicted him on matters of foreign adversaries—mounted after Coats criticized Trump's relationship with Russian president Vladimir Putin. In July 2019, Axios reported that Trump had been "eager" to remove Coats. That month, Trump met with Ratcliffe about succeeding Coats. According to The New York Times, Trump was later impressed by Ratcliffe's performance in the special counsel Robert Mueller's testimony to Congress, in which Ratcliffe chastised Mueller over the Mueller report—including allegations that the report had been written by allies of Hillary Clinton—and defended Trump. On July 28, Trump publicly named Ratcliffe as his nominee for director of national intelligence. Trump later stated that the intelligence community had "run amok" and that Ratcliffe would "rein it in".

Ratcliffe's close association with Trump elicited concerns from several Republicans in the Senate, particularly North Carolina senator Richard Burr, the chair of the Senate Select Committee on Intelligence. Democrats on the committee suggested that he would not sufficiently scrutinize the Durham special counsel investigation and would not affirm the assessments of intelligence analysts against Trump's beliefs. Ratcliffe's nomination was further complicated by his lack of prominence; several Republicans, including some in leadership positions, told Politico that they had either never heard of him or had only seen him on television. He faced additional questions over allegations that he had exaggerated his tenure as a federal prosecutor, and he was rebuked for his relative inexperience for the position. On August 2, Trump announced that he would not nominate Ratcliffe as the director of national intelligence, citing press coverage. Ratcliffe stated on social media that he had chosen to withdraw his nomination, believing that confirmation was not guaranteed.

=== Second nomination and confirmation ===
On February 28, 2020, Trump nominated Ratcliffe to serve as the director of national intelligence. Richard Burr indicated that he would seek to have Ratcliffe appear before the Senate Select Committee on Intelligence, expressing discontent with having an acting director lead the Office of the Director of National Intelligence; Trump had appointed Richard Grenell as the acting director earlier that month. Ratcliffe's nomination allowed Grenell to remain in the position indefinitely, a maneuver that ensured the director of national intelligence would be a Trump loyalist for possibly several months. According to The New York Times, Ratcliffe was given the assurance that he would be able to appoint his own officials. The agreement conflicted with Trump's intention to install the businessman Steve Feinberg in a high-level position within the Office of the Director of National Intelligence. Despite remaining concerns regarding Ratcliffe's partisanship and qualifications, his second nomination was considered to be easier than his first; Grenell's aggressive tenure and the COVID-19 pandemic—particularly claims from Trump allies that COVID-19 began in a lab—gave urgency to a permanent director.

Ratcliffe appeared before the Senate Select Committee on Intelligence on May 5. His confirmation hearing was the first in-person convention of senators in over a month and the first to employ social distancing measures imposed after the COVID-19 pandemic began. Ratcliffe largely refused to affirm his stance on several contentious issues, including Trump's dismissals of inspectors general that began weeks prior and whether the Russian government had colluded with Trump's 2016 campaign. Many of the committee's Democrats remained opposed to Ratcliffe; Virginia senator Mark Warner, the ranking member of the Senate Select Committee on Intelligence, stated that it was insufficient that his primary qualification appeared to be that he was not Grenell. On May 19, the committee voted to approve Ratcliffe's nomination in an 8–7 vote along party lines. The Senate voted to confirm Ratcliffe in a 49–44 along party lines on May 21. Ratcliffe was the first director of national intelligence to receive no support from the opposition party since the position was established in 2004.

=== Tenure ===
Ratcliffe was sworn in as the director of national intelligence on May 26, 2020. His tenure was marked by a political shift in the Office of the Director of National Intelligence; Marc E. Polymeropoulos, a former intelligence officer, told The New York Times that the presence of a high-ranking "politicized" intelligence official was unprecedented. In one of his initial acts, Ratcliffe declassified transcripts of an intercepted call between Michael Flynn, the former national security advisor, and a Russian diplomat. In August, he moved to end briefings to Congress on foreign threats to the 2020 presidential election. The decision limited the public's knowledge of threats to the election. That month, he told Fox News that China, not Russia presented a greater threat to the 2020 election. In the weeks preceding the 2020 presidential election, Ratcliffe warned of Iranian interference in the election.

In June 2020, Ratcliffe sought a declassification review and an unredacted copy of the House Permanent Select Committee on Intelligence's report on Russian interference from 2018. The report—owing to the presence of sensitive information—was kept in a lockbox at the George Bush Center for Intelligence, the Central Intelligence Agency's headquarters. Ratcliffe visited the facility in August to read the documents. The following month, he declassified U.S. intelligence that suggested Hillary Clinton had approved a plan to damage Trump's 2016 campaign by associating him with Russian hackers responsible for the 2016 Democratic National Committee email leak. According to The New York Times, Gina Haspel, the director of the Central Intelligence Agency, opposed the move, believing it could endanger sources and expose the agency's methods of gathering intelligence; Ratcliffe and Mark Meadows, the White House chief of staff, overrode her objections. The documents served as the basis for a conspiracy theory disparaging Clinton. Trump referenced the theory in his first debate against Joe Biden. South Carolina senator Lindsey Graham additionally used the theory to question James Comey, the former director of the Federal Bureau of Investigation.

In the Trump administration, Ratcliffe served as a supportive figure whom Trump trusted, particularly relative to Haspel and Christopher A. Wray, the director of the Federal Bureau of Investigation. Beginning in September, Trump ceased receiving briefings from his designated briefer, Beth Sanner, instead favoring meetings with Ratcliffe multiple times per week; the shift towards Ratcliffe occurred as Trump campaigned in the 2020 election and as a COVID-19 outbreak within the White House spread to his allies. In October, Politico reported that Ratcliffe had gone off-script when he had detailed that Iranian interference in the election was intended to "damage President Trump". He privately promoted an assessment that China was a greater threat to election security than Russia, a claim that was later in conflict with other intelligence reports. Ratcliffe's insertion of text warning about China in a classified document was deemed an "outrageous misrepresentation" of information compiled by analysts, according to Barry A. Zulauf, the analytic ombudsman in the Office of the Director of National Intelligence.

In January 2021, Phil Waldron, a retired United States Army colonel, alleged on a podcast that Trump would be able to declare a national emergency and seize voting machines using Ratcliffe's accusations towards China. The document was delayed amid a dispute concerning China's role in the election. The plan was supported by Flynn. Ratcliffe and his aides were unaware of Waldron and Flynn's intentions until the House Select Committee to Investigate the January 6th Attack on the United States Capitol began investigating the claim. Meadows blocked Flynn's attempt to reach Ratcliffe. According to testimony from the political aide Cassidy Hutchinson, Ratcliffe told her that Trump knew he lost but that he did not want to concede the election to Biden. Ratcliffe was compelled to testify in Trump's election obstruction case in March 2023.

== Post-government work (2021–2024) ==
In June 2023, Ratcliffe joined The Heritage Foundation as a visiting fellow for national security, cybersecurity, and intelligence. He was involved in national security personnel and policy planning for the second presidential transition of Donald Trump. Ratcliffe proposed revoking the security clearances of former intelligence officials who signed a letter alleging that the Hunter Biden laptop controversy was a Russian operation; Trump signed an executive order pursuant to Ratcliffe's suggestion in January 2025.

== Director of the Central Intelligence Agency (2025–present) ==
=== Nomination and confirmation as director ===
Ratcliffe is sworn in by vice president JD Vance in January 2025.

According to Bloomberg News, Ratcliffe had been considered as a possible candidate for attorney general or secretary of defense as early as July 2022, in the event that Donald Trump ran for president. In July 2024, Axios reported that Ratcliffe had been considered as Trump's director of the Central Intelligence Agency in his second term. Punchbowl News reported previously that Trump had been heavily considering nominating Ratcliffe for the position. On November 12, 2024, Trump named Ratcliffe as his nominee for director of the Central Intelligence Agency. According to Regime Change, Trump decided to name Ratcliffe after believing he would "shred" the Central Intelligence Agency. He compared Ratcliffe's physical appearance favorably to the actor Cary Grant. Ratcliffe appeared before the Senate Select Committee on Intelligence on January 15, 2025. In his opening statement, Ratcliffe stated that he would lead the Central Intelligence Agency to be non-partisan, aggressive, and less risk-averse. Democrats objected to Ratcliffe's nomination and sought to delay it. The Senate voted to confirm Ratcliffe in a 74–25 vote; twenty Democrats joined Republicans in confirming him.

=== Intelligence disclosures and mass firings ===
After being confirmed as the director of the Central Intelligence Agency, Ratcliffe told Breitbart News that he favored the COVID-19 lab leak theory. Hours later, the agency released an assessment affirming the theory. Ratcliffe was involved in negotiating the prisoner exchange between the Russian entrepreneur Alexander Vinnik and the American schoolteacher Marc Fogel, as well as Russo-Ukrainian peace negotiations. After Trump ordered the declassification of files relating to the assassination of president John F. Kennedy, Ratcliffe informed officials in the Trump administration that some documents were unrelated to Kennedy.

In February 2025, Ratcliffe extended the federal deferred resignation program to the Central Intelligence Agency, encouraging older employees who joined following the September 11 attacks to retire in favor of younger workers. The program conflicted with Ratcliffe's intent for the agency to shift its efforts towards countering China. Ratcliffe's efforts to fire officers intensified in March after a federal judge ruled that he had the authority to dismiss employees at will. That month, Elon Musk met with Ratcliffe to discuss "government efficiency" efforts at the Central Intelligence Agency. In May, The Washington Post reported that the agency intended to cut over one thousand positions within Trump's term. Ratcliffe sought to end diversity hiring programs in favor of what he described as a merit-based approach; some critics accused Ratcliffe of dismantling programs that had made it easier for the Central Intelligence Agency to blend in with local populations.

In March 2025, Ratcliffe testified before the Senate Select Committee on Intelligence on a Signal group chat for discussing imminent strikes in Yemen that month. The chat's contents were leaked by The Atlantic's editor-in-chief Jeffrey Goldberg, who was accidentally added as a member. Ratcliffe, who participated in the group chat, told the committee that his use of Signal was "lawful". He appeared before the House Permanent Select Committee on Intelligence the following day, continuing to state that he had not committed wrongdoing. In response to a lawsuit filed by the watchdog organization American Oversight seeking to preserve the contents of the group chat, the Central Intelligence Agency said in a court filing that Ratcliffe's messages could not be retrieved because they had been deleted from his phone; although the group chat's settings had been changed to automatically remove messages, prior chats from Ratcliffe would have needed to be manually deleted.

=== Foreign operations and election counter-investigation ===
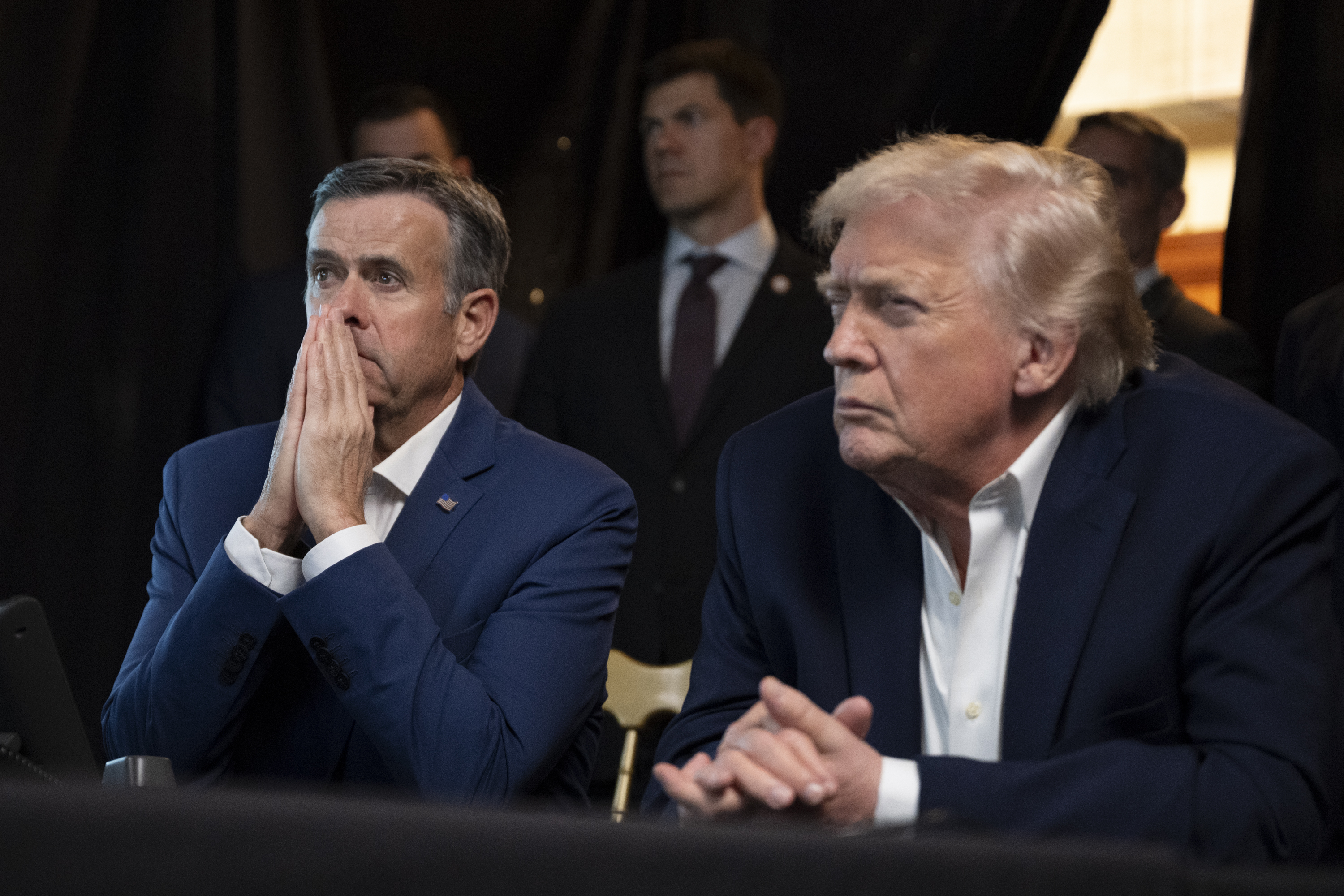
Ratcliffe (left) monitoring the U.S. intervention in Venezuela from Mar-a-Lago

After taking office, Ratcliffe ordered a review of the Central Intelligence Agency's assessment of Russian interference in the 2016 elections. In July 2025, the agency determined that John O. Brennan had hastened the investigation, but did not dispute its conclusion. After the Central Intelligence Agency's review, Ratcliffe posted on social media that Brennan and James Comey, the former director of the Federal Bureau of Investigation, had negatively affected the quality of the assessment. According to The New York Times, Ratcliffe referred Brennan to the Federal Bureau of Investigation for criminal prosecution over statements he made to the Senate Select Committee on Intelligence; Brennan's testimony, then over seven years old, appeared to exceed the statute of limitations for possible charges. In August, the bureau raided the home of John Bolton, the former national security advisor, using limited intelligence that Ratcliffe provided to its director, Kash Patel.

As early as February 2025, Ratcliffe was involved in discussions over Iran's nuclear program. Following Israeli prime minister Benjamin Netanyahu's visit to the United States that month, Trump directed Ratcliffe to meet with Netanyahu and Mossad director David Barnea in Israel. Ratcliffe discussed possible covert actions against Iran with Netanyahu and Israeli intelligence officials in May. At Camp David, Ratcliffe briefed Trump that an Israeli attack on Iran was imminent in June. That month, he told Trump in a White House classified meeting that Iran was close to obtaining a nuclear weapon. After the United States struck Iranian nuclear sites, Ratcliffe said that the strikes had "severely damaged" Iran's nuclear program.

After Trump ordered the freeze of U.S. military aid to Ukraine in March 2025, Ratcliffe convinced Trump to allow the agency to continue sharing intelligence, due to the potential threats to CIA officers in the country. Ratcliffe maintained the number of CIA personnel in Ukraine and doubled the funding for the agency's programs there. In June 2025 the CIA and the military began working to increase the effectiveness of Ukrainian drone strikes inside Russia, assisting them in identifying and targeting bottlenecks in Russia's energy industry. Ratcliffe frequently spoke to Trump about the drone campaign and the U.S. role in it. The CIA was also authorized to assist with the Ukrainian drone strikes on Russian "shadow fleet" vessels. Under Ratcliffe, the CIA's operations against Russia became "much more aggressive" than they had been under the previous administration.

In September 2025, The New York Times reported that Ratcliffe had supported secretary of state Marco Rubio's campaign to oust Venezuelan president Nicolás Maduro. Ratcliffe was involved in authorizing covert action in Venezuela. After U.S. forces raided the country and seized Maduro, Ratcliffe met with acting president Delcy Rodríguez in Caracas, a move believed to bolster Venezuela's government rather than its opposition. Ratcliffe was involved in military planning in preparation for a war with Iran, particularly presenting tactics alongside Dan Caine, the chairman of the Joint Chiefs of Staff. In testimony before the Senate Select Committee on Intelligence, Ratcliffe did not say whether Iran would be capable of launching long-range missiles within six months but said that Iran had been a "constant threat" and posed an "immediate threat".

In August 2026, Ratcliffe held a secret meeting with Russian intelligence officers in Moscow, which included Sergei Naryshkin, the director of the Foreign Intelligence Service. The Wall Street Journal reported that Ratcliffe's visit was to caution the Kremlin against attacking NATO members amid the stalemate in Ukraine. There was no official comment by the U.S. government, and Trump downplayed the visit as "semi-routine", emphasizing that Putin is "not going to attack a NATO territory".

== Political positions ==
=== Domestic affairs ===
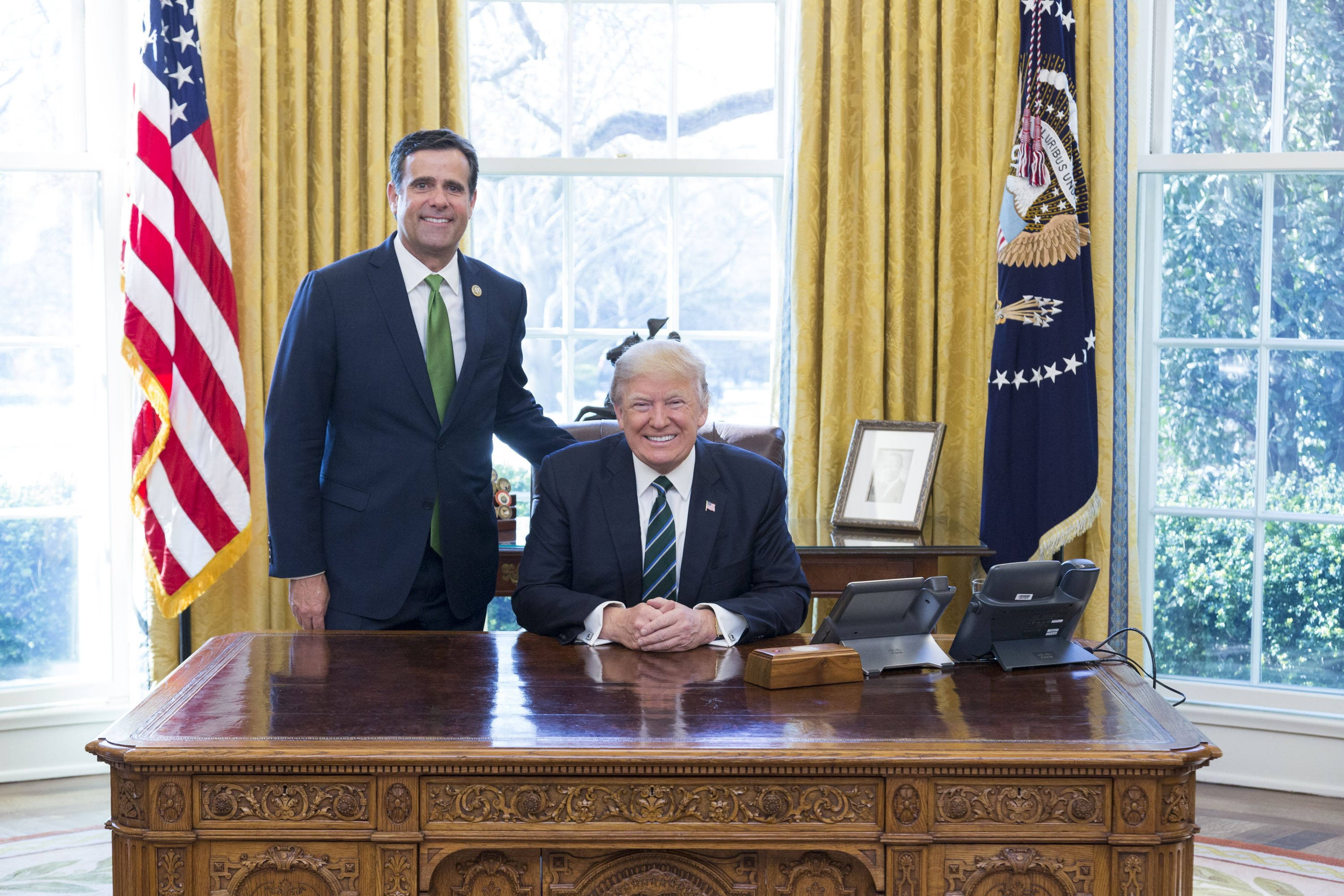
Ratcliffe (left) standing next to president Donald Trump in 2017

In his initial campaign in the 2014 United States House of Representatives election for Texas's fourth congressional district, Ratcliffe ran as a libertarian conservative in opposition to broad government spending, including the Affordable Care Act. His campaign advertisements included a promotion in which Ratcliffe vowed to "stand up" to president Barack Obama's policies. In August 2015, Ratcliffe criticized the expansion of the national debt and attributed it to the enlargement of the federal government. He proposed bills to eliminate the Open World program and repeal the establishment of the Consumer Financial Protection Bureau. Ratcliffe voted against disaster relief in the aftermath of Hurricane Harvey.

Ratcliffe endorsed Texas senator Ted Cruz for the 2016 presidential election in 2015. He later supported Donald Trump after Cruz's loss in the Republican Party presidential primaries. Ratcliffe called for an investigation into the Hillary Clinton email controversy and the Clinton Foundation–State Department controversy. Ratcliffe is considered to be a Trump ally. Although Ratcliffe opposed the American Health Care Act, he switched his support after Trump said he would support the bill. He supported Trump's decision to fire the director of the Federal Bureau of Investigation, James Comey.

In March 2014, Ratcliffe expressed his support for jailing—as opposed to deporting—illegal immigrants. He co-sponsored Kate's Law, a bill that would cease funding for sanctuary cities. In July 2017, Ratcliffe signed a letter urging Republican leadership to hold a vote on Trump's additions to the Mexico–United States border wall.

=== National security issues ===
As chair of the House Homeland Security Subcommittee on Cybersecurity and Infrastructure Protection, Ratcliffe advocated for partnerships with state and local governments on cybersecurity. After the Twitter account of the United States Central Command was compromised by sympathizers of the Islamic State, he called for a national cyber strategy. Alongside Texas representative Michael McCaul, the chair of the House Committee on Homeland Security, Ratcliffe proposed the National Cybersecurity Protection Act, a bill that would increase liability protections for companies that interface with the government. The bill was supported by the Obama administration.

=== Foreign policy ===
In August 2015, Ratcliffe criticized the foreign policy of the United States, citing the proliferation of Islamic State militants and the apparent dominance of Russia against the United States. He supported the 2017 Nangarhar airstrike. In November 2024, Ratcliffe advocated for assisting Israel in the Gaza war and its conflict with Hezbollah.

== Electoral history ==
=== 2014 ===
2014 United States House of Representatives Republican Party primary for Texas's fourth congressional district
Party	Candidate	Votes	%
Republican	Ralph Hall	29,815	45.4
Republican	John Ratcliffe	18,891	28.8
Republican	Lou Gigliotti	10,592	16.1
Republican	John Stacy	2,807	4.3
Republican	Brent Lawson	2,287	3.5
Republican	Tony Arterburn	1,250	1.9
Total votes		65,642	100.0

2014 United States House of Representatives Republican Party runoff for Texas's fourth congressional district
Party	Candidate	Votes	%
Republican	John Ratcliffe	22,257	52.8
Republican	Ralph Hall	19,882	47.2
Total votes		42,139	100.0

2014 United States House of Representatives election for Texas's fourth congressional district
Party	Candidate	Votes	%
Republican	John Ratcliffe	0	100.0
Total votes		0	100.0

=== 2016 ===
2016 United States House of Representatives Republican Party primary for Texas's fourth congressional district
Party	Candidate	Votes	%
Republican	John Ratcliffe	76,973	68.2
Republican	Lou Gigliotti	23,877	21.1
Republican	Ray Hall	12,303	10.9
Total votes		113,153	100.0

2016 United States House of Representatives election for Texas's fourth congressional district
Party	Candidate	Votes	%
Republican	John Ratcliffe	216,643	88.0
Libertarian	Cody Wommack	29,577	12.0
Total votes		246,220	100.0

=== 2018 ===
2018 United States House of Representatives Republican Party primary for Texas's fourth congressional district
Party	Candidate	Votes	%
Republican	John Ratcliffe	63,105	85.5
Republican	John Cooper	10,699	14.5
Total votes		73,804	100.0

2018 United States House of Representatives election for Texas's fourth congressional district
Party	Candidate	Votes	%
Republican	John Ratcliffe	188,667	75.7
Democratic	Catherine Krantz	57,400	23.0
Libertarian	Ken Ashby	3,178	1.3
Total votes		249,245	100.0

== Works cited ==
- Haberman, Maggie; Swan, Jonathan (2026). Regime Change: Inside the Imperial Presidency of Donald Trump. New York: Simon & Schuster. ISBN 978-1-6680-6724-6.

U.S. House of Representatives
Preceded by Ralph Hall	Member of the U.S. House of Representatives from Texas's 4th congressional district 2015–2020	Succeeded by Pat Fallon
Government offices
Preceded by Richard Grenell; Acting	Director of National Intelligence; 2020–2021	Succeeded by Avril Haines
Preceded by Tom Sylvester; Acting	Director of the Central Intelligence Agency; 2025–present	Incumbent
Order of precedence
Preceded by Jay Clayton as Director of National Intelligence	Order of precedence of the United States as Director of the Central Intelligence Agency	Succeeded by Chuck Grassley as President pro tempore of the U.S. Senate
