= Avril Haines =

American lawyer (born 1969)

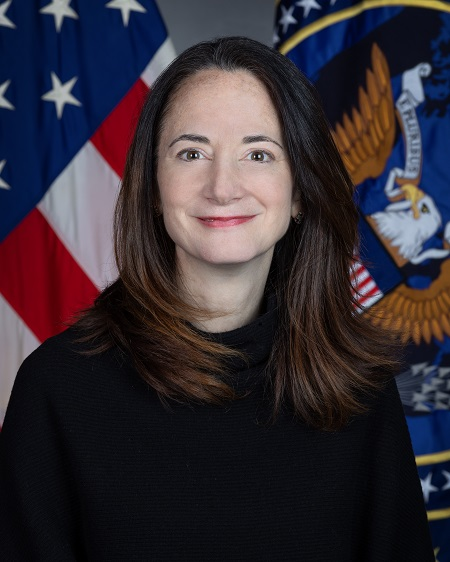
- Official portrait, 2021

7th Director of National Intelligence
- In office January 21, 2021 – January 20, 2025
- President: Joe Biden
- Deputy: Neil Wiley; Stacey Dixon
- Preceded by: John Ratcliffe
- Succeeded by: Tulsi Gabbard

27th United States Deputy National Security Advisor
- In office January 11, 2015 – January 20, 2017
- President: Barack Obama
- Leader: Susan Rice
- Preceded by: Antony Blinken
- Succeeded by: K. T. McFarland

4th Deputy Director of the Central Intelligence Agency
- In office August 9, 2013 – January 10, 2015
- President: Barack Obama
- Preceded by: Michael Morell
- Succeeded by: David Cohen

Personal details
- Born: Avril Danica Haines; August 27, 1969 (age 57) New York City, New York, U.S.
- Party: Democratic
- Spouse: David Davighi
- Parent: Thomas H. Haines (father)
- Education: University of Chicago (BA); Johns Hopkins University (attended); Georgetown University (JD)
- Haines's voice Haines testifies on Russia at a House Intelligence Committee hearing on global threats Recorded March 8, 2022

Avril Danica Haines (born August 27, 1969) is an American lawyer who served as the director of national intelligence in the Biden administration. She is the first woman to serve in this role. A member of the Democratic Party, she previously served as deputy national security advisor and deputy director of the Central Intelligence Agency (CIA) in the Obama administration. Prior to her appointment to the CIA, she was deputy counsel to the President for national security affairs. She currently serves as president of the Carnegie Endowment for International Peace.

== Early life and education ==
Haines was born in New York City on August 27, 1969, to Adrian Rappin (née Adrienne Rappaport) and Thomas H. Haines. She grew up on the Upper West Side of Manhattan. Haines' mother, a painter, was Jewish. When Haines was 10, her mother developed chronic obstructive pulmonary disease and contracted avian tuberculosis; Haines and her father nursed Adrian in a home ICU until her death when Haines was 15 years old. Her father, Thomas H. Haines, was a biochemist who graduated with a PhD from Rutgers University and helped in the formation of the CUNY School of Medicine, where he served as the chair of the biochemistry department.

After graduating from Hunter College High School, Haines moved to Japan for a year, where she enrolled at the Kodokan, an elite judo institute in Tokyo. In 1988, she enrolled in the University of Chicago where she studied physics. While attending the University of Chicago, she worked repairing car engines at an automobile repair shop in Hyde Park. In 1991 she took up flying lessons at the Princeton Airport outside Rocky Hill, New Jersey, where she met her future husband, David Davighi. She graduated with an AB in physics in 1992.

In 1992, Haines moved to Baltimore, and enrolled as a doctoral student in physics at Johns Hopkins University. However, later that year, she dropped out and with her future husband purchased a bar in Fell's Point, Baltimore, which had been seized in a drug raid; they turned the location into an independent bookstore and café. She named the store Adrian's Book Cafe, after her late mother; Adrian's realistic oil paintings filled the store. The bookstore won City Paper's "Best Independent Bookstore" in 1997 and was known for having an unusual collection of literary offerings, local writers, and small press publications. Adrian's hosted a number of literary readings, including erotica readings, which became a media focus when she was appointed by President Barack Obama to be the deputy director of the CIA. She served as the president of the Fell's Point Business Association until 1998.

In 1998, she enrolled at the Georgetown University Law Center, receiving her J.D. in 2001.

== Career ==
=== Early government service ===
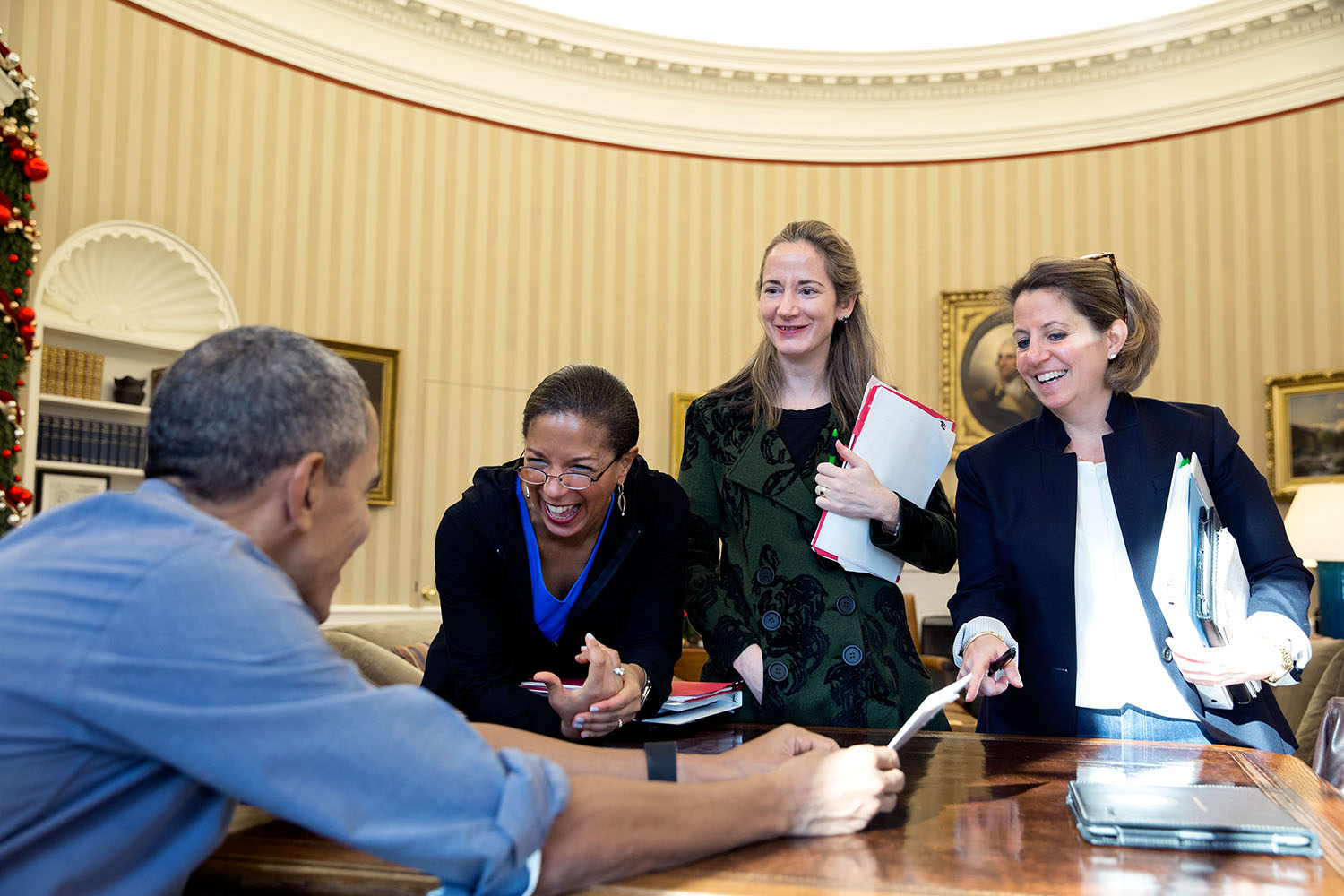
Left to right: President Obama, Susan Rice, Avril Haines, and Lisa Monaco (2015)

In 2001, Haines became a legal officer at the Hague Conference on Private International Law. In 2002, she became a law clerk for United States Court of Appeals for the Sixth Circuit Judge Danny Julian Boggs. From 2003 until 2006, she worked in the Office of the Legal Adviser of the Department of State, first in the Office of Treaty Affairs and then in the Office of Political Military Affairs. From 2007 until 2008, she worked for the United States Senate Committee on Foreign Relations as Deputy Chief Counsel for the Majority Senate Democrats (under then chairman Joe Biden).

=== Obama administration ===
Haines worked for the State Department as the assistant legal adviser for treaty affairs from 2008 to 2010, when she was appointed to serve in the office of the White House counsel as Deputy Assistant to the President and Deputy Counsel to the President for National Security Affairs at the White House.

On April 18, 2013, Obama nominated Haines to serve as Legal Adviser of the Department of State, to fill the position vacated after Harold Hongju Koh resigned to return to teaching at Yale Law School. However, on June 13, 2013, Obama withdrew Haines's nomination to be Legal Adviser of the Department of State, choosing instead to select her as Deputy Director of the Central Intelligence Agency. Haines was nominated to replace Michael Morell, the CIA's deputy and former acting director. The office of the deputy director is not subject to Senate confirmation, with Haines subsequently taking office on August 9, 2013, the final day of Morrell's tenure. Haines was the first woman ever to hold the office of the deputy director, while Gina Haspel was the first female career intelligence officer to be named director.

==== Torture report ====
In 2015, Haines, then deputy director of the CIA, was tasked with determining whether CIA personnel should be disciplined for hacking computers of Senate staffers authoring the Senate Intelligence Committee report on CIA torture. Haines chose not to discipline them, overruling the CIA Inspector General.

During the Democratic National Committee email leak in the middle of the 2016 presidential campaign, Haines as DNSA convened a series of meetings to discuss ways to respond to the hacking and leaks. Subsequently, she was involved in the CIA project of redacting the Senate report for release. In the end, only 525 pages of the 6,700 page CIA torture report were released.

After serving as deputy director of the CIA, Haines was tapped as Deputy National Security Advisor (DNSA), the first woman to hold that position.

==== Targeted drone killings ====
During her years in the Obama administration, Haines worked closely with John Brennan in determining administration policy on extrajudicial "targeted killings" by drones. Newsweek reported Haines was sometimes called in the middle of the night to evaluate whether a suspected terrorist could be "lawfully incinerated" by a drone strike.

The ACLU criticized the Obama policy on drone killings as failing to meet international human rights norms. Haines was instrumental in establishing the legal framework and policy guidelines for the drone strikes, which targeted suspected terrorists in Somalia, Yemen and Pakistan, but also resulted, according to human rights groups, in killing innocent civilians. An editor of In These Times said the policy guidelines "made targeted killings all over the world a normal part of US policy".

Critics of Haines' drone policy guidelines said that, although the guidelines stipulated "direct action must be conducted lawfully and taken against lawful targets," they did not reference any international or domestic law that might permit extrajudicial killings outside an active war zone. Opponents of US drone warfare have noted that Haines redacted the minimum criteria for an individual to be "nominated" for lethal action, that the term "nominated" is a deceptive euphemism for targeting people for assassination, and that the drone guidelines allow for the assassination of US citizens without due process.

=== Private sector ===
After leaving the White House, Haines was appointed to multiple posts at Columbia University. She was a senior research scholar and deputy director for the Columbia World Projects, a program designed to bring to bear academic scholarship on some of the most fundamental challenges the world is facing, and was designated the program's director in May 2020, replacing Nicholas Lemann. Haines was also a fellow at the Human Rights Institute and National Security Law Program at Columbia Law School.

Haines served as a commissioner on the National Commission on Military, National, and Public Service. She is also a distinguished fellow at the Institute for Security Policy and Law at Syracuse University and a Senior Fellow at the Johns Hopkins Applied Physics Laboratory.

==== Palantir and WestExec ====
Haines has consulted for Palantir Technologies, a data processing and analytics software solutions company that may have assisted with immigrant detention programs, and was an employee of WestExec Advisors, a consulting firm with a secretive client list that includes high-tech start-ups seeking Pentagon contracts. The firm was founded by Antony Blinken, Biden's secretary of state, and Michele Flournoy, a former Pentagon adviser.

In late June 2020, shortly after taking on the role of overseeing foreign policy and national security considerations for the Joe Biden 2020 presidential campaign transition team, references to Palantir and other corporations for which Haines had worked were removed from her fellowship résumé posted on the website of the Brookings Institution.

In July 2021, an article in The American Prospect discussed Haines in their analysis of the connections between WestExec and the Biden administration.

== Director of National Intelligence (2021–2025) ==
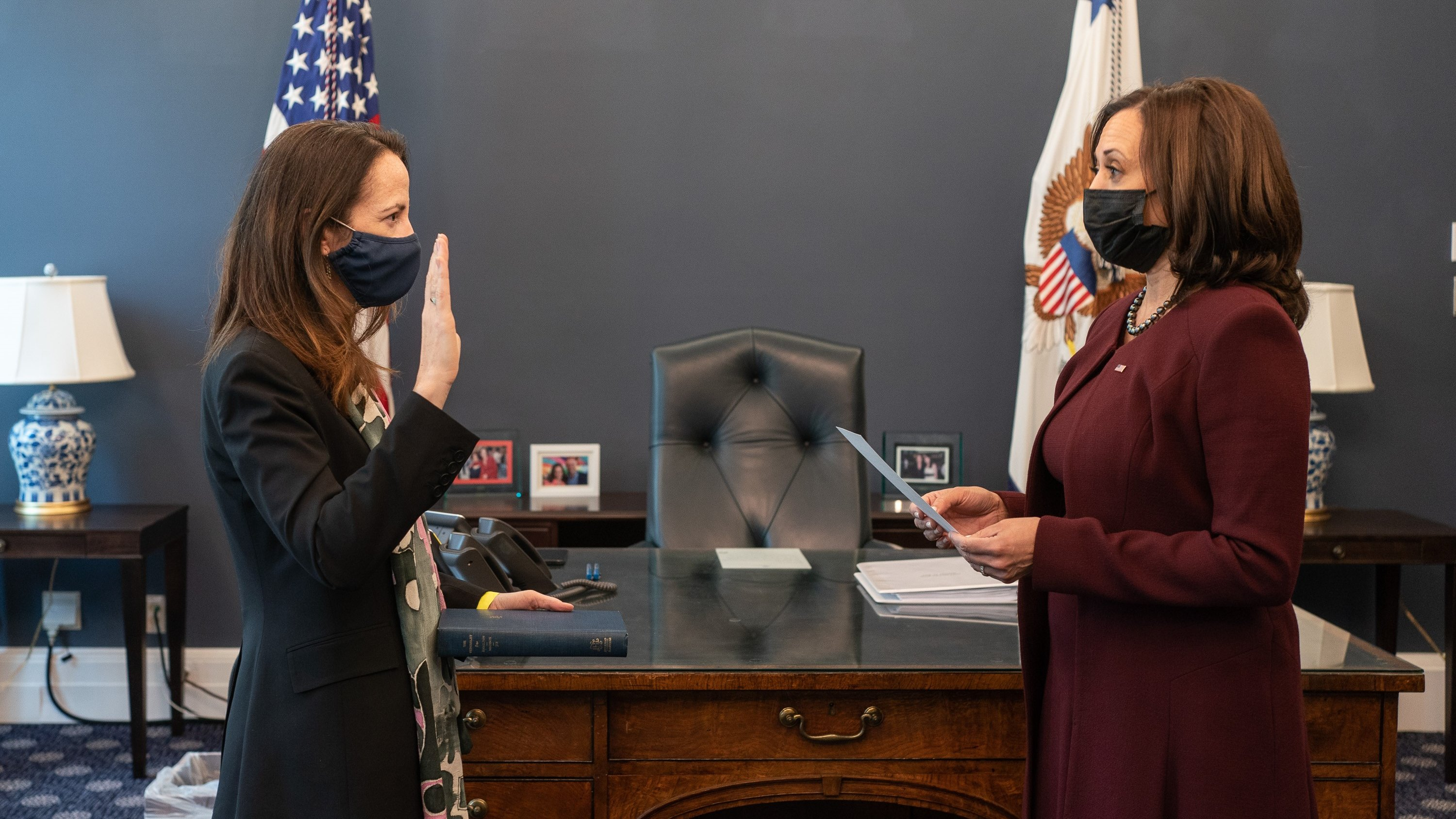
Haines was sworn in as Director of National Intelligence by Vice President Kamala Harris on January 21, 2021.

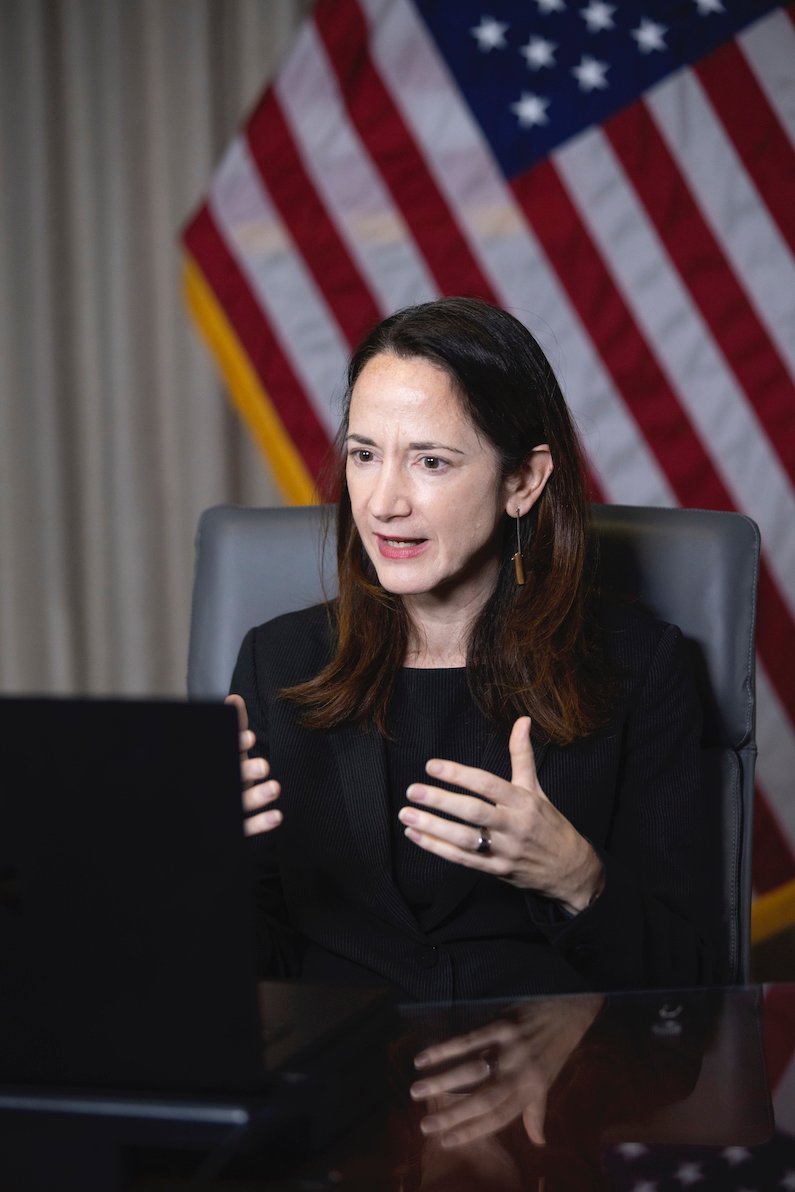
Haines on her first day in office

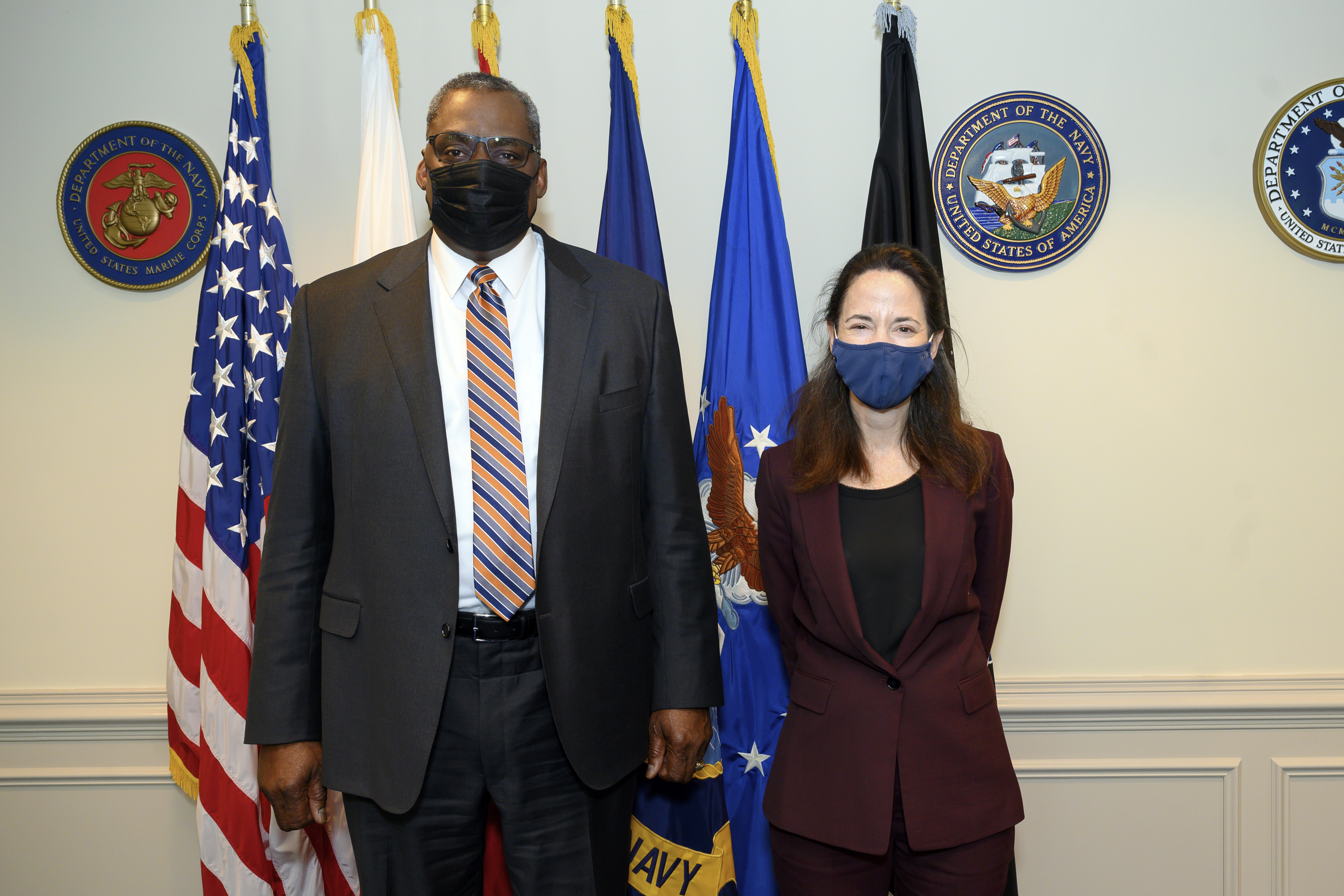
Secretary of Defense Lloyd J. Austin III (left) with Haines at the Pentagon

On November 23, 2020, Joe Biden, then the president-elect, announced his nomination of Haines for the position of Director of National Intelligence; she became the first woman to hold the position.

Prior to her confirmation hearings, Daniel J. Jones, chief investigator and author of the Senate Intelligence Committee report on CIA torture in 2009–2012, criticized Haines for determining that several CIA employees should not be disciplined for hacking computers of Senate staffers authoring the report in 2015. Haines, then Deputy Director, made the decision against the CIA inspector general's conclusion.

During her Senate confirmation hearing on January 19, 2021, Haines told Ron Wyden (D-OR) that she would comply with the National Defense Authorization Act for Fiscal Year 2020 requiring the intelligence community to share the report on who was responsible for Jamal Kashoggi's murder if confirmed. The Trump administration had refused to release the report.

Senator Martin Heinrich (D-NM) asked Haines if she agreed with the conclusion of the Senate Intelligence Committee's 2012 report on torture which said that the practice was ineffective for collecting intelligence because those tortured would say anything to make it stop. Haines said there were "better" techniques than torture, and that it was inhumane, degrading, and unlawful.

Wyden also asked if Haines agreed with the CIA Inspector General's conclusion that it was wrong for CIA agents to hack the computers of Senate staffers investigating the use of CIA torture during the Bush administration. Haines said she agreed with the Inspector General's apology for the hack.

Senators Marco Rubio (R-FL) and Mark Warner (D-VA) questioned Haines about U.S.–China relations and, specifically, whether she shared their opinion that China was an adversary. Haines said, "China is adversarial and an adversary on some issues and on other issues, we try to cooperate with them." Haines promised an "aggressive response" to China and to counter its "illegal and unfair practices," but also said the US would seek China's cooperation in addressing the climate crisis.

When questioned about the January 6, 2021, storming of the Capitol building, Haines said it was the primary responsibility of the FBI to investigate domestic threats, though she also committed to collaborating with the FBI and Department of Homeland Security to evaluate the public threat of QAnon, a conspiracy theory promoted by some supporters of President Donald Trump.

On January 20, 2021, Haines was confirmed by the Senate in an 84–10 vote. She was the first nominee of the Biden administration to be confirmed, and was sworn in the next day by Vice President Kamala Harris.

In May 2022, Haines warned against Russia and China's efforts to "try to make inroads with partners of ours across the world," mentioning Saudi Arabia and the United Arab Emirates as examples.

Haines was awarded the Australian Intelligence Medal as part of the 2024 King's Birthday Honours by the Australian Government. She was awarded the decoration for "distinguished service to the National Intelligence Community."

In July 2024, Haines released a statement that Iran was stoking and covertly encouraging protests against the Gaza war in the United States. When Israeli Prime Minister Benjamin Netanyahu addressed Congress two weeks later, he cited Haines to smear anti-war Americans as "useful idiots" manipulated by Iran. Senator Chris Van Hollen received a classified briefing from intelligence officials afterwards indicating that evidence of Iranian involvement was "extremely limited."

After the 2024 election, the Biden administration received intelligence that Israeli officials had internally begun to seriously discuss whether their military campaign in Gaza violated international law. Concerned over their own potential legal exposure, US policymakers held emergency meetings and debated whether they needed to end intelligence sharing with the Israel Defense Forces. Haines refused requests for the U.S. intelligence community to provide a briefing on the topic, and distanced herself from staffers who were pressing for an inquiry.

Under Haines, the Office of the Director of National Intelligence changed protocols for how other government bodies could access information, exclusively for inquiries regarding Israel and its compliance with international law. Such inquires now required cabinet approval, a standard adopted for no other country or situation.

Intelligence reports regarding potential Israeli violations were filtered through Brett McGurk and Amos Hochstein, two top Biden aides most supportive of the US-Israeli relationship, before reaching Haines' desk. Officials described widespread self-censorship of reports regarding Israeli conduct due to knowledge of the administration's desire to continue arms shipments and avoid legal obstacles.

In November 2024, Haines was awarded the NATO Parliamentary Assembly's "Women for Peace and Security Award". Her term ended January 20, 2025.

== Return to private sector ==
In June 2026, she was announced as the incoming president of the Carnegie Endowment for International Peace, succeeding Justice Mariano-Florentino Cuellar.

Government offices
Preceded by Michael Morell	Deputy Director of the Central Intelligence Agency; 2013–2015	Succeeded by David Cohen
Preceded by Antony Blinken	United States Deputy National Security Advisor; 2015–2017	Succeeded by K. T. McFarland
Preceded by John Ratcliffe	Director of National Intelligence; 2021–2025	Succeeded by Tulsi Gabbard
