= William W. Orwig =

American historian

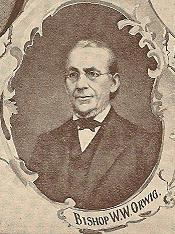
William Wagner Orwig

William Wagner Orwig (25 September 1810 – 29 May 1889) was a Bishop of the Evangelical Association in the United States, elected in 1859.

== Birth, ancestry and family ==
Orwig was born near Orwigsburg, Pennsylvania into a faithful Evangelical home. Orwigsburg was named in honor of his great-grandfather Gottfried Orwig, who emigrated from Germany and settled there in 1741. The home of William's grandfather, George Orwig Sr., was a preaching point where Jacob Albright was often a welcome guest. William's father, Abraham, moved to Union County, northwest of New Berlin, Pennsylvania, in 1811. William's uncle George settled in Sandusky County, Ohio in 1826. William's brother Abraham was a pioneer of the Evangelical Association Church in Bonfield, Illinois.

Orwig was married to Susanna Rishel, who was a brave and gracious helpmate to him. She was the daughter of George and Catharine Rishel, a prominent Evangelical family in Centre County, Pennsylvania. William and Susan's eldest son was the Rev. A.W. Orwig, who died at the advanced age (for the time) of ninety-one. He was a member of the Ohio Conference of the Evangelical Association, and was an editor and author. Among their daughters were Mary (the wife of the Rev. Josiah Bowersox, missionary to Oregon), Susan (the wife of the Rev. Elisha A. Hoffman, and a poet and hymn writer in her own right), Elizabeth (the wife of the Rev. S.L. Wiest), Addie (the wife of Isaac Y. Moyer, a noted Cleveland layman of the Church).

== Conversion and early ministry ==
Orwig was converted 4 June 1826 at the age of fifteen. He was received into the ministry in the Eastern Annual Conference of the Evangelical Association, 2 June 1828. He served as an itinerant circuit rider for several years. One of his circuits had thirty-two preaching points scattered through five counties. He was appointed Presiding Elder at the age of twenty-three.

== Editorial ministry ==
The 1836 General Conference of the Evangelical Association elected Orwig Book Agent and Editor. His headquarters became New Berlin, Pennsylvania, opening in 1837. He bought his denomination's first printing press! The 1839 General Conference relieved him of the office of Publisher and made him Editor of Der Christliche Botschafter (The Christian [or Christ's] Ambassador), the official German language periodical of the Evangelical Association. Charles Hammer, also from Orwigsburg, was elected Publisher.

== Der Christliche Botschafter ==
The first religious paper in the German language in America, Der Christliche Botschafter was founded in 1836. It became a stimulus to the rapid growth of the Evangelical Association, and a valuable means of recording the progressive movements of the denomination. Always held in high esteem, the pioneer preachers made diligent efforts to place it in the homes of all their members and converts. It was a significant agency in building Christian and denominational bonds.

== Other notable accomplishments ==
Orwig wrote the first history of the Evangelical Association in 1854. He was one of the founders of the Missionary Society of his Church, also serving as one of its early officers. He was a pioneer and a pathfinder. He boldly advocated for higher education and was instrumental in starting the first educational institution of his denomination.

== Episcopal ministry ==
The 1859 General Conference, meeting in Naperville, Illinois, elected William W. Orwig to the episcopacy. He served in this position only four years, however, his health proving insufficient to the task. In 1863, therefore, he was made Editor again as well as Treasurer of the Missionary Society. Later he served as a Presiding Elder in the Erie Annual Conference of his denomination until he retired.

== Orwig the Evangelical ==
According to one biographer, Rev. Orwig was an "up-to-date man," not afraid to advocate new movements and new ideas. He was conservative, yet aggressive, willing to fight for his convictions. He was a student, well versed in many lines of literature. Orwig also was a staunch defender of the doctrines of his Church, and an especially strong proponent of the doctrine of entire sanctification as taught in the Book of Discipline of the Evangelical Association.

Another historian calls Orwig "the most aggressive pioneer builder in the Evangelical Church." He was the leading spirit in launching the Sunday School movement in 1832. He promoted the cause of education, the first institution of learning, and the Charitable Society. During his lifetime, the Evangelical Association grew from a membership of just 2,000 to over 145,000.

In an 1859 issue of The Evangelical Messenger, an article titled "Our New Bishop" states about Bishop Orwig:

He has a sound reliable judgment, and an unflinching firmness of character.... His predominant feature of character... is his indomitable energy, and untiring perseverance.

== Death and burial ==
Bishop Orwig died 29 May 1889 at the age of seventy-eight. The memorial report of his death expressed deep gratitude for his founding role in the Evangelical Association. "We earnestly urge all our young ministers," the report read, "to study the lives of the Fathers of our Church, praying that they may all be consecrated by the Holy Spirit as these men of God were."

== An appreciation ==
J.B. Kanaga, an important Pastor and Presiding Elder of the Evangelical Association in Ohio, and representative of the same to the great Councils of the Federated Churches of America, wrote a tribute to Bishop Orwig on the centennial of his birth (1910). He wrote:

In his preaching he was always exact, and adequate in his treatment of a subject. He was always concerned and often even anxious about his preparation. But when he came to the delivery he stood forth as a Master in Israel. Not gifted with eloquence, and I think, actually indifferent to all but apostolic unction and Gospel truth... he wrought with heroic devotion in the day of small things and the hand of that master builder was in the foundation of the Church.

== Selected writings ==
- the first history of the Evangelical Association (1854)
- Die Heils Fuelle, (translated, "Full Salvation")
- a catechism for the Evangelical Association
- a book on Pastoral Theology

== See also ==
- List of bishops of the United Methodist Church
