= 6-Hydroxynicotinate 3-monooxygenase =

Class of enzymes

Identifiers
- EC no.: 1.14.13.114

Databases
- IntEnz: IntEnz view
- BRENDA: BRENDA entry
- ExPASy: NiceZyme view
- KEGG: KEGG entry
- MetaCyc: metabolic pathway
- PRIAM: profile
- PDB structures: RCSB PDB PDBe PDBsum
Search
- PMC: articles
- PubMed: articles
- NCBI: proteins

6-Hydroxynicotinate 3-monooxygenase (EC 1.14.13.114, NicC, 6HNA monooxygenase, HNA-3-monooxygenase) is an enzyme with systematic name 6-hydroxynicotinate,NADH:oxygen oxidoreductase (3-hydroxylating, decarboxylating). This enzyme catalyses the following chemical reaction

6-hydroxynicotinic acid
+ NADH + H^{+}
O_{2}
H_{2}O
2,5-dihydroxypyridine
+ NAD^{+} + CO_{2}

The four substrates of this enzyme are 6-hydroxynicotinic acid, reduced nicotinamide adenine dinucleotide (NADH), oxygen, and a proton. Its products are 2,5-dihydroxypyridine, oxidised NAD^{+}, water, and carbon dioxide. It is a flavoprotein that uses flavin adenine dinucleotide as a cofactor.
