= Neil Wiley =

American government official

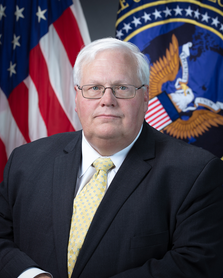

Acting Director of National Intelligence
- In office January 20, 2021
- President: Joe Biden
- Preceded by: John Ratcliffe
- Succeeded by: Lora Shiao (acting)

Principal Executive of National Intelligence
- In office May 13, 2020 – February 2021; Acting: May 13, 2020 – May 26, 2020
- President: Donald Trump; Joe Biden
- Preceded by: Kash Patel
- Succeeded by: Stacey Dixon (as Principal Deputy Director)

Personal details
- Born: Baltimore, Maryland, U.S.
- Spouse: Alison Michelli
- Education: University of Maryland, Baltimore County (BA)
- Civilian awards: National Intelligence Distinguished Service Medal

Military service
- Allegiance: United States
- Branch/service: United States Navy
- Years of service: 1983–2003
- Military awards: DIA Director's Award

Neil Wiley OBE is an American intelligence official and military veteran who served as Principal Executive in the Office of the Director of National Intelligence (ODNI) performing the duties of Principal Deputy Director of National Intelligence from May 13, 2020 until February 2021.

== Early life and education ==
Born and raised in Baltimore, Maryland, Wiley attended the University of Maryland Baltimore County, where he studied Biological Sciences, Ancient History and Classical Languages. Wiley is married to Alison Michelli, a writer, and has 1 child.

== Career ==
Wiley has held a large number of leadership positions in a wide variety of intelligence roles. In addition to Principal Executive at ODNI, he also served as the Chairman of the National Intelligence Council (NIC), and as Director for Analysis at the Defense Intelligence Agency (DIA), where he led their all-source analytic effort. Additionally, Wiley served the country in many different capacities prior to that:

- As the DIA Principal Deputy Director for Analysis
- DIA Chief of the Defense Technology and Long-Range Analysis Office
- DIA Chief, of the Military Forces Analysis Office.

On top of the above, Wiley has been critical in international intelligence efforts, having served at the United States European Command's Joint Analysis Center in various roles, including deputy director of intelligence. Wiley served in the United States Navy from 1983 through 2003, initially as a surface line officer and, later, as an intelligence officer.

== Awards and honors ==
- The Presidential Rank Award-Meritorious Senior Executive
- National Intelligence Distinguished Service Medal
- National Intelligence Superior Service Medal
- The DIA Director's Award
- The DIA Exceptional Civilian Service Medal
- Named an honorary officer of the Most Excellent Order of the British Empire (OBE) for service as US Liaison Officer to PJHQ and recognized as instrumental in US Britain relations.

Political offices
| Preceded by John Ratcliffe | Director of National Intelligence; Acting; 2021 | Succeeded by Lora Shiao; Acting |
