= Stacey Dixon =

American government official (born 1971)

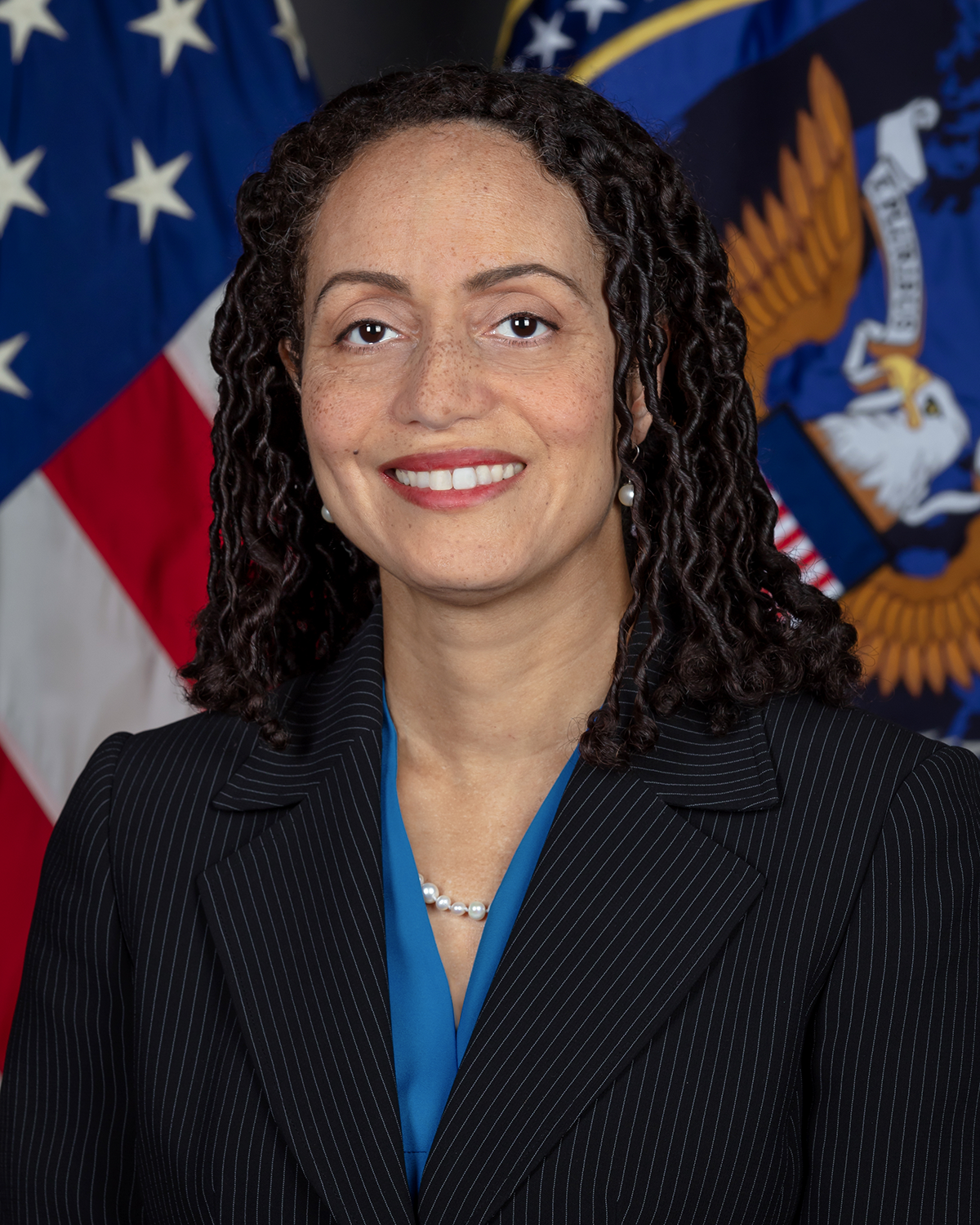
- Official portrait, 2021

Acting Director of National Intelligence
- In office January 20, 2025 – January 25, 2025
- President: Donald Trump
- Preceded by: Avril Haines
- Succeeded by: Lora Shiao (acting)

6th Principal Deputy Director of National Intelligence
- In office August 4, 2021 – January 25, 2025
- President: Joe Biden; Donald Trump
- Preceded by: Neil Wiley (as Principal Executive)
- Succeeded by: Aaron Lukas

8th Deputy Director of the National Geospatial-Intelligence Agency
- In office July 2019 – August 2021
- President: Donald Trump; Joe Biden
- Succeeded by: Tonya Wilkerson

Personal details
- Born: January 9, 1971 (age 55) Washington, D.C., U.S.
- Education: Stanford University (BS); Georgia Institute of Technology (MS, PhD)

Stacey Angela Dixon (born January 9, 1971) is an American mechanical engineer and intelligence official who served as Principal Deputy Director of National Intelligence from 2021 to 2025 during the administration of Joe Biden and the second presidency of Donald Trump. According to Politico, she was selected to serve as Acting Director of National Intelligence succeeding Avril Haines after Donald Trump was sworn in during his second inauguration as President of the United States on January 20, 2025. She was replaced by Lora Shiao as acting director, who remained in that position until she was succeeded by Tulsi Gabbard in February 2025.

== Education ==
Dixon earned a Bachelor of Science in mechanical engineering from Stanford University in 1993, followed by a Master of Science in 1995 and a Doctor of Philosophy in 2000 in the same from Georgia Tech. Her doctoral thesis was entitled Biomechanical analysis of coronary arteries using a complementary energy model and designed experiments. She completed a chemical engineering postdoctoral fellowship at the University of Minnesota College of Science and Engineering.

== Career ==
As an undergraduate, Dixon was an intern at Nokia Bell Labs. From 2003 to 2007, she worked at the Central Intelligence Agency, where she was detailed to the advanced systems and technology directorate of the National Reconnaissance Office. From 2007 to 2010, Dixon was a staffer on the United States House Permanent Select Committee on Intelligence. She then joined the National Geospatial-Intelligence Agency and, between 2010 and 2016, served sequentially as chief of congressional and intergovernmental affairs, deputy director of corporate communications, and deputy director of NGA's research directorate. Dixon then served as the deputy director of the Intelligence Advanced Research Projects Activity from 2016 to 2018 and director from 2018 to July 2019, when she became the eighth deputy director of the National Geospatial-Intelligence Agency.

Dixon is also a presidentially-appointed member of the Coast Guard Academy Board of Visitors, an appointed NGA Liaison to the United States Geospatial Intelligence Foundation Board of Directors and Spelman College Center of Excellence for Minority Women in STEM Leadership Advisory Board.

President Joe Biden announced plans to nominate then-NGA Deputy Director Dixon for the position of principal deputy director of national intelligence on April 21, 2021. She was confirmed by voice vote on August 3 and received praise from Director of National Intelligence Avril Haines. She was sworn in on August 4, 2021 and is the highest-ranking Black woman in the intelligence community. Dixon was replaced by President Trump as Acting Director of National Intelligence with Lora Shiao, the chief operating officer for the agency.

In 2024, Dixon earned her fifth Wash100 Award for advancing transparency and data use in the intelligence community.

In 2025, Dixon temporarily served as the acting Director of National Intelligence under President Donald Trumps presidency.

Dixon now is a Distinguished Professor of the Practice and a member of Sam Nunn School of International Affairs, teaching national intelligence.

Political offices
Preceded by Avril Haines	Director of National Intelligence; Acting; 2025	Succeeded by Lora Shiao; Acting
