= Matthew D. Orwig =

American lawyer (born 1959)

Matthew Orwig
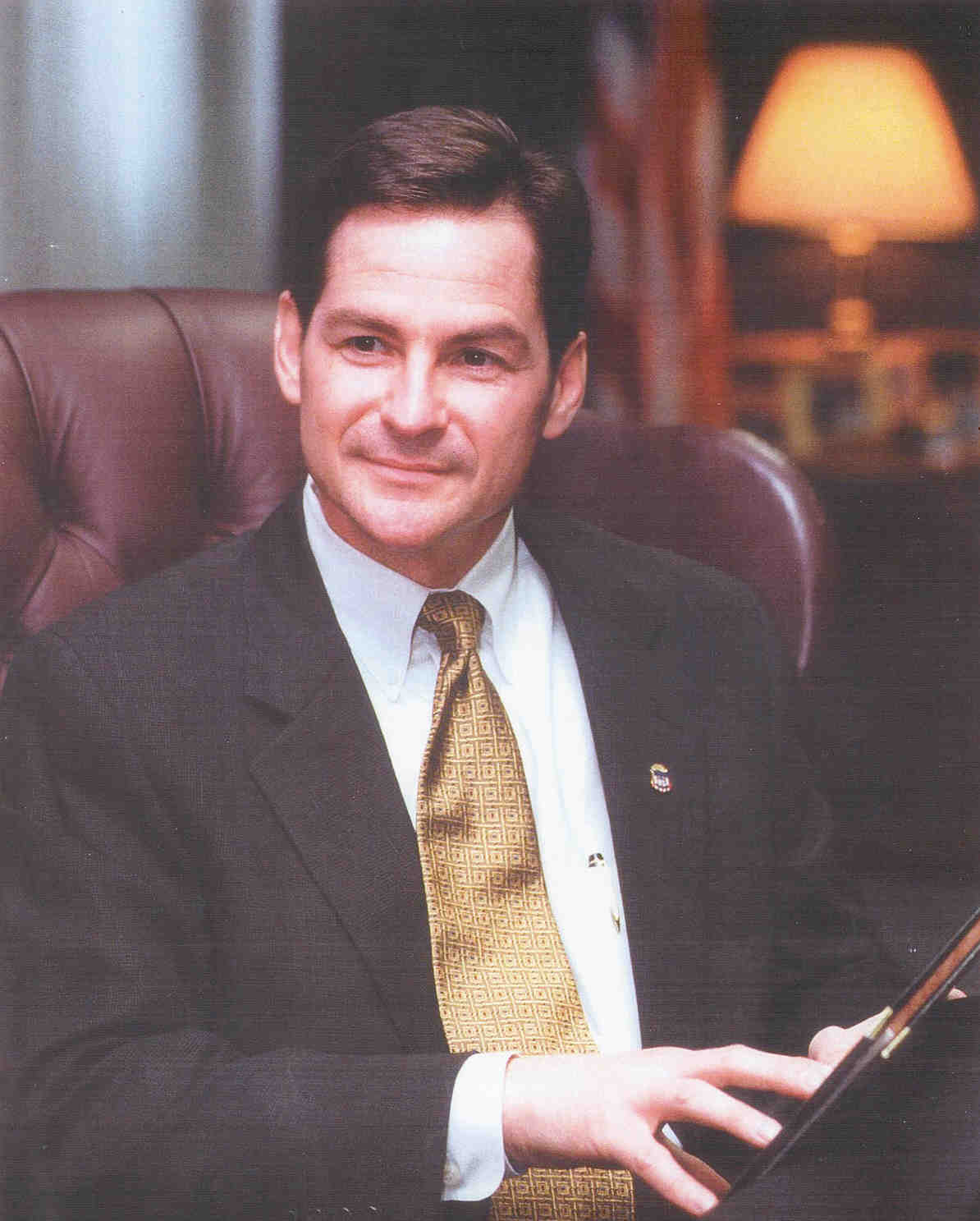

United States Attorney for the Eastern District of Texas
- In office 2001–2007
- President: George W. Bush
- Succeeded by: John Ratcliffe

Personal details
- Born: January 2, 1959 (age 67) Ardmore, Oklahoma, U.S.
- Education: Texas Tech University (BA, JD)

Matthew D. Orwig is an American attorney. Orwig has served three presidents and five attorneys general in leadership positions in the Department of Justice. He was appointed by President George W. Bush to serve as U.S. Attorney for the Eastern District of Texas.

from 2001 to 2007. Orwig served as managing partner of the Dallas office of SNR Denton and was a member of the Litigation and Disputes Department Leadership from 2009 to 2011. Orwig joined the global law firm Jones Day in 2012, as a Partner of the Business and Tort Litigation Practice in the Dallas office. In 2017, Orwig became a founding partner of Winston & Strawn’s Dallas office where he was a member of the firm's litigation department before retiring in January 2024.

== Education ==
Orwig graduated from Coronado High School in Lubbock, Texas in 1977, and earned his B.A. in Political Science from Texas Tech University in 1981. Orwig graduated from Texas Tech University School of Law in 1984. He was named the 2007 "Alumnus of the Year" by Texas Tech University School of Law.

Orwig has also served as an adjunct professor at Southern Methodist University Dedman School of Law and Texas A&M University School of Law.

== Career ==
Orwig began his career as a judicial law clerk for the Halbert O. Woodward, chief judge of the Northern District of Texas. Orwig then spent three years at Jones, Trout, Flygare, Moody & Brown, where he progressed from associate to partner. Orwig joined the United States Department of Justice as an Assistant U.S. Attorney in the Northern District of Texas in 1989. He stayed there until 1997, when he left to spend a year in Washington D.C. as a Legal Advisor in the Executive Office for United States Attorneys. In 1998, he became an Assistant U.S. Attorney and Health Care Fraud Coordinator in the Eastern District of Texas.

President George W. Bush named Orwig U.S. Attorney for the Eastern District of Texas in 2001. As U.S. Attorney, Orwig directed prosecutions in cases targeting public corruption, money laundering, securities fraud, insider trading, health care fraud, capital murder and domestic terrorism. He also served on numerous subcommittees on the Advisory Committee of U.S. Attorneys, including the White Collar Fraud Subcommittee and the Health Care Fraud Working Group.

Orwig joined the global law firm Winston & Strawn as a founding partner in February 2017 as one of 23 partners from eight different law firms in Texas. Before joining Winston & Strawn, Orwig was a partner of the Business and Tort Litigation Practice at Jones Day from 2011 to 2012 and a founding member and Managing Partner of the Dallas office of SNR Denton (then Sonnenschein, Nath & Rosenthal) from 2007 to 2011. He retired from Winston & Strawn in January 2024.

Since entering the private sector, Orwig has also been recognized as a premier Texas attorney by a number of publications. Orwig has been listed as a Texas Super Lawyer since 2009, and as a top attorney in criminal defense/white collar by the "Corporate Counsel" edition of the national Super Lawyers. D Magazine named him among 2008's "Best Lawyers in Dallas," citing his work in white-collar criminal defense, and later named him among the "Best Business Lawyers" of 2009, citing his representation of companies involved in government investigations. The February 2009 issue of D Magazine named Orwig as the lawyer "You Need to Know."

Orwig was a principal author of the Dallas Ethics Code, which was adopted by the Dallas City Council.
