= Director of National Intelligence =

US Cabinet-level government official

- Seal of the director of national intelligence

- Flag of the director of national intelligence

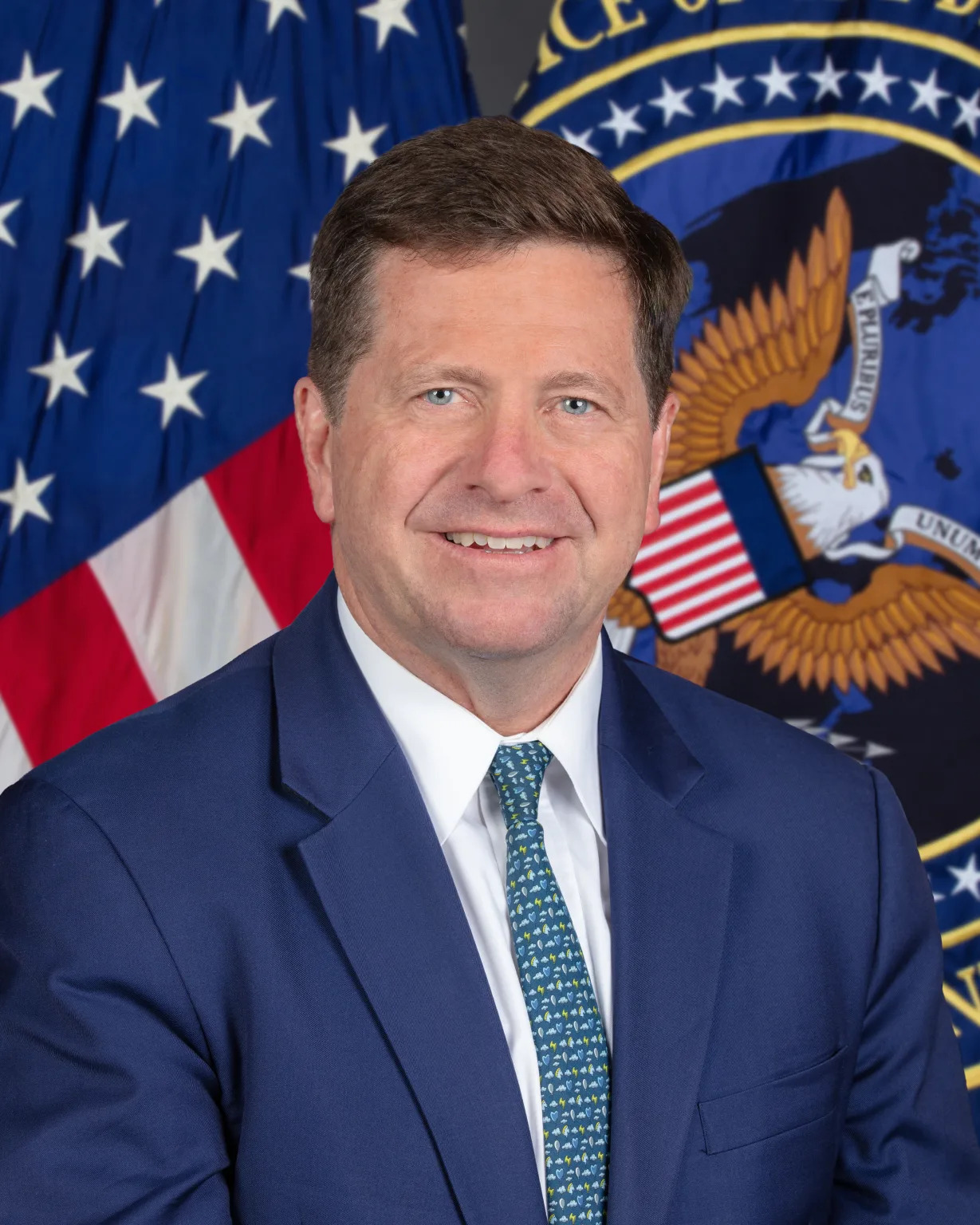
- Incumbent; Jay Clayton since August 3, 2026
- Office of the Director of National Intelligence
- Member of: Cabinet; National Security Council; Homeland Security Council
- Reports to: President of the United States
- Seat: Washington, D.C.
- Appointer: The president; with Senate advice and consent
- Constituting instrument: 50 U.S.C. § 3023
- Precursor: Director of Central Intelligence (DCI)
- Formation: April 21, 2005
- First holder: John Negroponte
- Deputy: Principal Deputy Director of National Intelligence
- Website: www.odni.gov

The director of national intelligence (DNI) is a cabinet-level United States government intelligence and security official. The position is required by the Intelligence Reform and Terrorism Prevention Act of 2004 to serve as executive head of the United States Intelligence Community (IC) and to direct and oversee the National Intelligence Program (NIP). All 18 IC agencies, including the Central Intelligence Agency (CIA), the Defense Intelligence Agency (DIA) and the National Security Agency (NSA), report directly to the DNI. Other federal agencies with intelligence capabilities also report to the DNI, including the Federal Bureau of Investigation (FBI).

The DNI also serves as the principal advisor to the president of the United States, the National Security Council, and the Homeland Security Council on all intelligence matters. The DNI, supported by the Office of the Director of National Intelligence (ODNI), produces the President's Daily Brief, a highly classified document including intelligence from all IC agencies, shared each morning with the president of the United States. The DNI, who is appointed by the president of the United States and is subject to confirmation by the United States Senate, serves at the pleasure of the president.

President George W. Bush strengthened the role of the DNI on July 30, 2008, with Executive Order 13470, which, among other things, solidified the DNI's legal authority to direct intelligence gathering and analysis, and to set policy for intelligence sharing with foreign agencies and for the hiring and firing of senior intelligence officials. The DNI was given further responsibility for the entire IC's whistleblowing and source protection by President Barack Obama via Presidential Policy Directive 19 on October 10, 2012.

The position was elevated to a cabinet-level role during the first presidency of Donald Trump and retained this status in subsequent administrations. Currently, the DNI attends all cabinet meetings and liaises with the executive office of the president and other Cabinet secretaries in the execution of their duties. President Donald Trump nominated Tulsi Gabbard to the position in 2025, and she was subsequently confirmed by the US Senate on February 12, 2025.

On May 22, 2026, Gabbard announced her resignation from the role of DNI, effective June 30, citing her need to care for her husband, who had been diagnosed with bone cancer. On June 11, President Trump nominated Jay Clayton, a New York state attorney and former chair of the Securities and Exchange Commission, to replace Gabbard as DNI. He was confirmed by the Senate on July 28 and sworn into office on August 3.

== History ==
=== Founding ===
Before the DNI was formally established, the head of the United States Intelligence Community was the director of central intelligence (DCI), who concurrently served as the director of the Central Intelligence Agency (CIA).

The 9/11 Commission recommended establishing the DNI position in its 9/11 Commission Report, not released until July 22, 2004, as it had identified major intelligence failures that called into question how well the intelligence community was able to protect U.S. interests against foreign terrorist attacks.

Senators Dianne Feinstein, Jay Rockefeller and Bob Graham introduced S. 2645 on June 19, 2002, to create the position of Director of National Intelligence. Other similar legislation soon followed. After considerable debate on the scope of the DNI's powers and authorities, the United States Congress passed the Intelligence Reform and Terrorism Prevention Act of 2004 by votes of 336–75 in the House of Representatives, and 89–2 in the Senate. President George Bush signed the bill into law on December 17, 2004. Among other things, the law established the DNI position as the designated leader of the United States Intelligence Community and prohibited the DNI from serving as the CIA director or the head of any other intelligence community element at the same time. In addition, the law required the CIA director to report their agency's activities to the DNI.

Critics say compromises during the bill's crafting led to the establishment of a DNI whose powers are too weak to adequately lead, manage and improve the performance of the intelligence community. In particular, the law left the United States Department of Defense in charge of the National Security Agency (NSA), the National Reconnaissance Office (NRO), and the National Geospatial-Intelligence Agency (NGA).

Under 50 U.S.C. § 3026, "under ordinary circumstances, it is desirable" that either the director or the principal deputy director of national intelligence be an active-duty commissioned officer in the armed forces or have training or experience in military intelligence activities and requirements. Only one of the two positions can be held by a military officer at any given time. The statute does not specify what rank the commissioned officer will hold during their tenure in either position.

=== Appointments ===
The first director of national intelligence was former U.S. ambassador to Iraq John Negroponte who was appointed on February 17 2005, by President George W. Bush, subject to confirmation by the U.S. Senate. It was reported that President Bush's first choice for DNI was former director of central intelligence Robert M. Gates, who was serving as president of Texas A&M University, but who declined the offer. Negroponte was confirmed by a Senate vote of 98–2 on April 21, 2005, and he was sworn in by President Bush the same day.

On February 13, 2007, Mike McConnell became the second director of national intelligence, after Negroponte was appointed Deputy Secretary of State. Donald M. Kerr was confirmed by the U.S. Senate to be Principal Deputy Director of National Intelligence on October 4, 2007, and sworn in on October 9, 2007. Kerr, from Virginia, was previously the director of the National Reconnaissance Office and the deputy director for science and technology at the CIA before that. Earlier in his career, he was an assistant director at the FBI, in charge of their Laboratory Division from 1997 to 2001.

On January 29, 2009, retired Navy admiral Dennis C. Blair became the third DNI on after being nominated by newly inaugurated President Barack Obama. President Obama dismissed Blair whose resignation became effective May 28, 2010.

On July 20, 2010, President Barack Obama nominated retired Air Force lieutenant general James Clapper as the fourth DNI. Clapper was confirmed by the U.S. Senate on August 5, and replaced acting director David C. Gompert.

The fifth DNI, Dan Coats, the sixth DNI, John Ratcliffe, and acting DNIs Joseph Maguire, Richard Grenell and Lora Shiao, all served between March 16, 2017, and January 21, 2021, during the first administration of President Donald Trump.

The seventh DNI is Avril Haines, who took office on January 21, 2021. The first woman to hold the office, she was nominated by President-elect Joe Biden on November 23, 2020 and confirmed by the Senate on January 20, 2021. She resigned January 20, 2025 at the conclusion of Joe Biden's term in office.

On November 13, 2024, President-elect Donald Trump announced his intention to nominate Army Reserve lieutenant colonel Tulsi Gabbard as the director of national intelligence upon returning to the presidency in January 2025. Gabbard was confirmed by the U.S. Senate on February 12, 2025, replacing acting director Lora Shiao. With this appointment, she became the first female military combat veteran to serve as DNI, the first Pacific Islander American and first Hindu American in this position as well, to hold a Cabinet-level position.

=== Website issues ===
Declan McCullagh at News.com wrote on August 24, 2007, that the DNI site was configured to prevent search engines from indexing pages at DNI.gov. This effectively made the DNI website invisible to all search engines and in turn, any search queries. Ross Feinstein, Spokesman for the DNI, said this configuration was removed as of September 3, 2007. "We're not even sure how [the robots.txt file] got there." On September 7, McCullagh reported that the DNI appeared to be allowing search engine crawling again.

=== Reform initiatives ===
In September 2007, the Office of the DNI released "Intelligence Community 100 Day & 500 Day Plans for Integration & Collaboration". These plans include a series of initiatives designed to build the foundation for increased cooperation and reform of the U.S. Intelligence Community.

== Line of succession ==
The line of succession for the director of national intelligence is as follows:

1. Principal Deputy Director of National Intelligence
2. Deputy Director of National Intelligence for Intelligence Integration
3. Director of the National Counterterrorism Center
4. Director of the National Counterintelligence and Security Center
5. Inspector General of the Intelligence Community

== List of directors ==
Position succeeded the Director of Central Intelligence.

Denotes acting capacity.

No.	Name	Start	End	Duration	President(s)
1	John Negroponte	April 21, 2005	February 13, 2007	1 year, 298 days	George W. Bush (2001–2009)
2	Mike McConnell	February 13, 2007	January 20, 2009	1 year, 342 days	George W. Bush (2001–2009)
–	Donald Kerr; Acting	January 20, 2009	January 27, 2009	7 days	Barack Obama (2009–2017)
–	Ronald Burgess; Acting	January 27, 2009	January 29, 2009	2 days	Barack Obama (2009–2017)
3	Dennis Blair	January 29, 2009	May 28, 2010	1 year, 119 days	Barack Obama (2009–2017)
–	David Gompert; Acting	May 28, 2010	August 5, 2010	69 days	Barack Obama (2009–2017)
4	James Clapper	August 5, 2010	January 20, 2017	6 years, 168 days	Barack Obama (2009–2017)
–	Stephanie O'Sullivan; Acting	January 20, 2017	January 20, 2017	0 days	Donald Trump (2017–2021)
–	Mike Dempsey; Acting	January 20, 2017	March 16, 2017	55 days	Donald Trump (2017–2021)
5	Dan Coats	March 16, 2017	August 15, 2019	2 years, 152 days	Donald Trump (2017–2021)
–	Susan M. Gordon; Acting	August 15, 2019	August 15, 2019	0 days	Donald Trump (2017–2021)
–	Joseph Maguire; Acting	August 15, 2019	February 20, 2020	189 days	Donald Trump (2017–2021)
–	Andrew P. Hallman; Acting	February 20, 2020	February 20, 2020	0 days	Donald Trump (2017–2021)
–	Richard Grenell; Acting	February 20, 2020	May 26, 2020	96 days	Donald Trump (2017–2021)
6	John Ratcliffe	May 26, 2020	January 20, 2021	239 days	Donald Trump (2017–2021)
–	Neil Wiley; Acting	January 20, 2021	January 20, 2021	0 days	Joe Biden (2021–2025)
–	Lora Shiao; Acting	January 20, 2021	January 21, 2021	1 day	Joe Biden (2021–2025)
7	Avril Haines	January 21, 2021	January 20, 2025	3 years, 365 days	Joe Biden (2021–2025)
–	Stacey Dixon; Acting	January 20, 2025	January 25, 2025	5 days	Donald Trump (2025–present)
–	Lora Shiao; Acting	January 25, 2025	February 12, 2025	18 days	Donald Trump (2025–present)
8	Tulsi Gabbard	February 12, 2025	June 19, 2026	1 year, 127 days	Donald Trump (2025–present)
–	Bill Pulte; Acting	June 19, 2026	August 3, 2026	45 days	Donald Trump (2025–present)
9	Jay Clayton	August 3, 2026	Incumbent	107 days	Donald Trump (2025–present)

== See also ==
- Information Sharing Environment
- Intelligence Advanced Research Projects Activity
- Intellipedia
- Joint Worldwide Intelligence Communications System (JWICS)
- National Intelligence Coordination Center
- The National Security Act of 1947
- Open source intelligence
- Title 32 of the CFR
- United States Joint Intelligence Community Council
- US intelligence community A-Space
- Privacy and Civil Liberties Oversight Board (PCLOB)
