= National Intelligence Coordination Center =

The National Intelligence Coordination Center was established on 1 October 2007 by the United States Director of National Intelligence (DNI). The center's purpose is to give the DNI the means to more effectively and efficiently direct and integrate collection assets and activities of all national, defense and domestic intelligence organizations against standing and emergent strategic intelligence priorities.

== See also ==
- Director of National Intelligence
- DIA
