= Kurdish villages depopulated by Turkey =

Depopulation of the Kurdish villages in Turkey

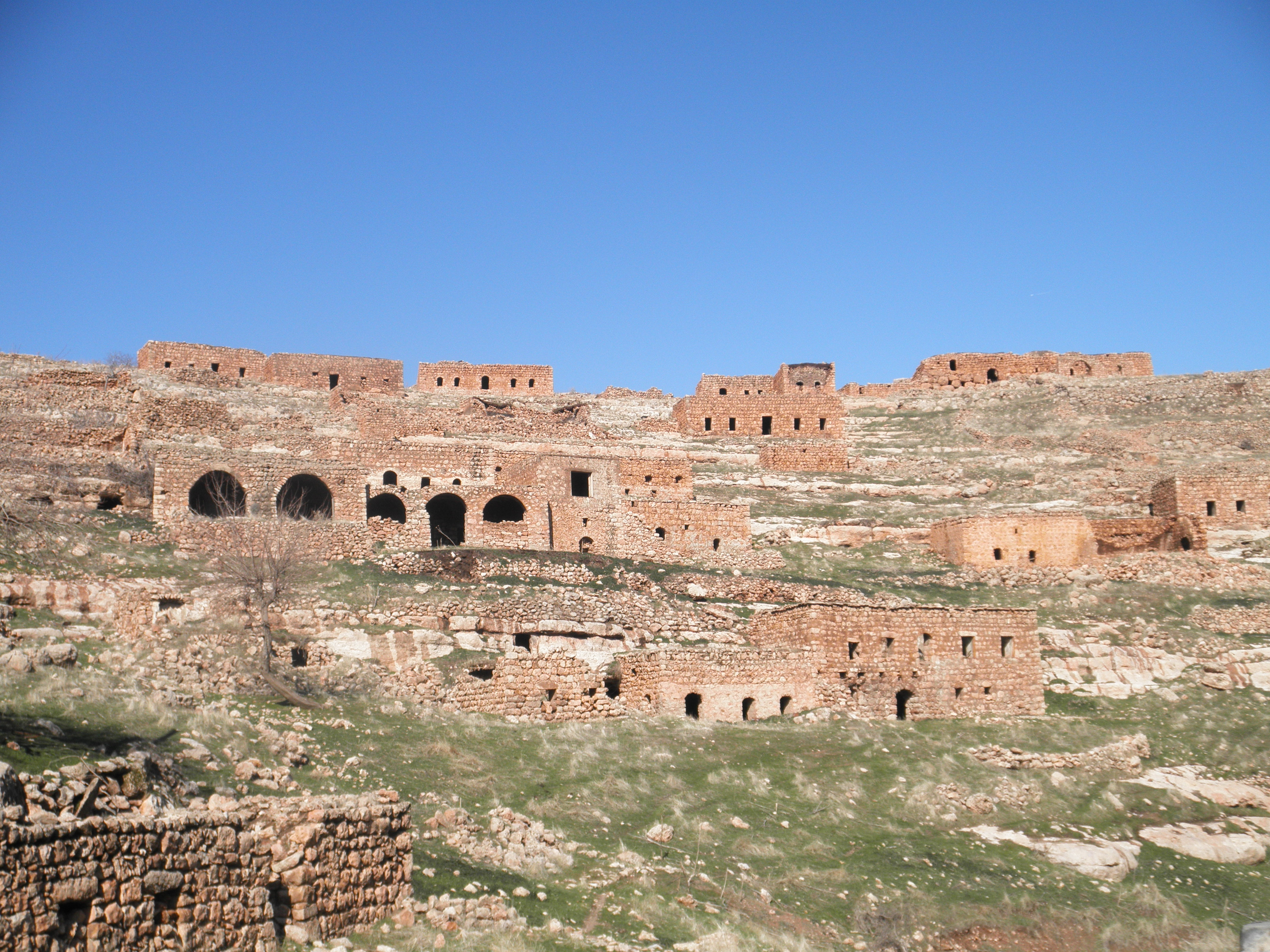
A previously depopulated Kurdish village; Ulaş, in Dargeçit District

The number of Kurdish villages depopulated by Turkey is estimated at 3,000 to 4,000. Since 1984, the Turkish military has embarked on a campaign to eradicate the Kurdistan Workers Party; by the year 2000, some 30,000 people had died and two million Kurdish refugees had been driven out of their homes into cities.

== Background ==
Until the 1970s, about 70% of the Kurdish population of Turkish Kurdistan inhabited one of the approximately 20,000 Kurdish villages. But by 1985, only 58% of the population were still living in the rural areas and much of the countryside in Kurdish populated regions had been depopulated by the Turkish government, with Kurdish civilians moving to local centers such as Diyarbakır, Van, and Şırnak, as well as to the cities of western Turkey and even to western Europe. The causes of the depopulation were in most cases the Turkish state's military operations and to a lesser extent attacks by the PKK on villages it deemed defended by collaborators of the Turkish Government. Often Kurds had to decide whether to become a member of the state-sponsored Village Guards, be deported or else they could face attacks by the PKK. Human Rights Watch has documented many instances where the Turkish military forcibly evacuated villages, destroying houses and equipment to prevent the return of the inhabitants. An estimated 3,000 Kurdish villages in Southeast Anatolia were virtually wiped from the map, representing the displacement of more than 378,000 people. During the 1990s, the Turkish military reportedly deployed the US manufactured helicopters Sikorsky and Cobra to drive out the Kurdish population from the villages.

== Depopulated and demolished towns and villages ==
According to the Humanitarian Law Project, 2,400 Kurdish villages have been destroyed and 18,000 Kurds have been executed by the Turkish government. Other estimates have put the number of destroyed Kurdish villages at over 4,000. In total, up to 3,000,000 people (mainly Kurds) have been displaced.

The Kurdish Human Rights Project divides the depopulation (evacuation) of villages in 5 phases.

- The initial phase between 1985 and 1989
- The phase of centralization during 1990–1991
- the phase of the systematic village evacuation between 1992 and 1993
- the phase of the escalation of the village evacuation in 1994
- between 1995 and 2001, further villages were depopulated

An estimated 1,000,000 people are still internally displaced as of 2009.

=== 1992 ===
- November – Kelekçi village destruction

== Government compensation ==
The Internal Displacement Monitoring Centre stated in 2009 that the Turkish government has taken "notable" steps to address the internal displacement situation. These include commissioning a national survey on the number and conditions of IDPs, drafting a national IDP strategy, adopting law on compensation, and putting together a comprehensive pilot action plan in Van Province and 13 other south-eastern provinces addressing rural and urban situations of displacement.

== Depopulated villages (as of 2025) ==
List of villages which have been depopulated as of 2025:

Province	District	Village	Province	District	Village
Şırnak Province	Beytüşşebap	Dilekyolu	Hakkari	Şemdinli	Ayranlı
Şırnak Province	Beytüşşebap	Dönmezler	Hakkari	Şemdinli	Çevre
Şırnak Province	Beytüşşebap	Kovankaya (Assyrian)	Hakkari	Şemdinli	Meşelik
Şırnak Province	Beytüşşebap	Tuzluca	Hakkari	Yüksekova	Ikiyaka
Şırnak Province	Beytüşşebap	Yenice	Hakkari	Yüksekova	Pirinçeken
Şırnak Province	Güçlükonak	Bulmuşlar	Hakkari	Yüksekova	Yazılı
Şırnak Province	Güçlükonak	Çetinkaya	Hakkari	Çukurca	Çağlayan
Şırnak Province	Güçlükonak	Erdurdu	Hakkari	Çukurca	Çayırlı
Şırnak Province	Güçlükonak	Eskikapı	Hakkari	Çukurca	Çınarlı
Şırnak Province	Güçlükonak	Kırkağaç	Hakkari	Çukurca	Dede
Şırnak Province	Güçlükonak	Özbaşoğlu	Hakkari	Çukurca	Işıklı
Şırnak Province	Güçlükonak	Yenidemir	Hakkari	Çukurca	Kavaklı
Şırnak Province	İdil	Ozan	Hakkari	Çukurca	Kavuşak
Şırnak Province	İdil	Yaylaköy	Hakkari	Çukurca	Kurudere
Şırnak Province	Silopi	Ballıkaya	Siirt	Pervari	Medrese
Şırnak Province	Silopi	Derebaşı	Bitlis	Bitlis	Esenburun
Şırnak Province	Silopi	Düzalan	Mardin	Dargeçit	Ormaniçi
Şırnak Province	Silopi	Karacaköy	Mardin	Nusaybin	Değirmencik
Şırnak Province	Silopi	Koyunören	Mardin	Nusaybin	Kaleli
Şırnak Province	Silopi	Uyanık	Mardin	Ömerli	Dönërdere
Şırnak Province	Silopi	Yazıköy			
Şırnak Province	Şırnak	Alkemer			
Şırnak Province	Şırnak	Anılmış			
Şırnak Province	Şırnak	Boyunkaya			
Şırnak Province	Şırnak	Çadırlı			
Şırnak Province	Şırnak	Çakırsöğüt			
Şırnak Province	Şırnak	Güleşli			
Şırnak Province	Şırnak	Günedoğmuş			
Şırnak Province	Şırnak	İnceler			
Şırnak Province	Şırnak	Kapanlı			
Şırnak Province	Şırnak	Karageçit			
Şırnak Province	Şırnak	Koçağılı			
Şırnak Province	Şırnak	Kuşkonar			
Şırnak Province	Şırnak	Seslice			
Şırnak Province	Şırnak	Tekçınar			
Şırnak Province	Şırnak	Üçkıraz			
Şırnak Province	Uludere	Akduman			
Şırnak Province	Uludere	Doğan			
Şırnak Province	Uludere	Onbudak			

=== Villages repopulated after 2007 ===
List of villages that have been repopulated after 2007:

Province	District	Village	Info
Batman	Gercüş	Cevizli	Unpopulated until 2016
Batman	Hasankeyf	Gaziler	Unpopulated until 2025
Batman	Kozluk	Kolludere	Unpopulated until 2008
Batman	Hasankeyf	Palamut	Unpopulated until 2013
Bingöl	Yedisu	Akımlı	Unpopulated until 2014
Bingöl	Yayladere	Alınyazı	Unpopulated until 2011
Bingöl	Kiğı	Baklalı	Unpopulated until 2011
Bingöl	Yayladere	Bilekkaya	Unpopulated until 2008
Bingöl	Yayladere	Boğazköy	Unpopulated until 2014
Bingöl	Adaklı	Cevizli	Unpopulated until 2009
Bingöl	Yayladere	Çatalkaya	Unpopulated until 2008
Bingöl	Kiğı	Çomak	Unpopulated until 2024
Bingöl	Yayladere	Gökçedal	Unpopulated until 2011
Bingöl	Kiğı	İlbeyi	Unpopulated until 2011
Bingöl	Yayladere	Kırköy	Unpopulated until 2014
Bingöl	Kiğı	Kutluca	Unpopulated until 2010
Bingöl	Adaklı	Maltepe	Unpopulated until 2024
Bingöl	Yayladere	Yavuztaş	Unpopulated until 2009
Bingöl	Kiğı	Yukarıserinyer	Unpopulated until 2012
Bitlis	Tatvan	Anadere	Unpopulated until 2010
Bitlis	Bitlis	Aşağıbalcılar	Unpopulated until 2013
Bitlis	Tatvan	Çavuşlar	Unpopulated until 2010
Bitlis	Bitlis	Ilıcak	Unpopulated until 2008
Bitlis	Bitlis	Kayalıbağ	Unpopulated until 2008
Bitlis	Bitlis	Kınalı	Unpopulated until 2010
Bitlis	Tatvan	Odabaşı	Unpopulated until 2012
Bitlis	Bitlis	Oğulcak	Unpopulated until 2022
Bitlis	Bitlis	Sarpkaya	Unpopulated until 2008
Bitlis	Bitlis	Uçankuş	Unpopulated until 2008
Bitlis	Bitlis	Üçevler	Unpopulated until 2008
Diyarbakır	Ergani	Devletkuşu	Unpopulated until 2009
Diyarbakır	Çınar	Gürses	Unpopulated until 2010
Diyarbakır	Ergani	Kavurmaküpü	Unpopulated until 2009
Diyarbakır	Dicle	Kırkpınar	Unpopulated until 2010
Diyarbakır	Dicle	Kurşunlu	Unpopulated until 2013
Diyarbakır	Bismil	Kurudeğirmen	Unpopulated until 2008
Diyarbakır	Dicle	Taşağıl	Unpopulated until 2013
Diyarbakır	Lice	Yolçatı	Unpopulated until 2009
Erzurum	Hınıs	Ilıcaköy	Unpopulated until 2010
Hakkari	Hakkari	Aksu	Unpopulated until 2015
Hakkari	Çukurca	Cevizli	Unpopulated until 2011
Hakkari	Çukurca	Kazan	Unpopulated until 2014
Hakkari	Yüksekova	Sürekli	Unpopulated until 2013
Hakkari	Hakkari	Yoncalı	Unpopulated until 2013
Iğdır	Aralık	Tarlabaşı	Unpopulated until 2022
Mardin	Dargeçit	Akçaköy	Unpopulated until 2010
Mardin	Derik	Bağarası	Unpopulated until 2023
Mardin	Dargeçit	Çavuşlu	Unpopulated until 2013
Mardin	Dargeçit	Korucu	Unpopulated until 2013
Mardin	Dargeçit	Kumdere	Unpopulated until 2013
Mardin	Dargeçit	Kuşluca	Unpopulated until 2013
Mardin	Midyat	Oyuklu	Unpopulated until 2012
Mardin	Nusaybin	Pazarköy	Unpopulated until 2016
Mardin	Nusaybin	Tekağaç	Unpopulated until 2022
Mardin	Ömerli	Topağaç	Unpopulated until 2008
Mardin	Dargeçit	Ulaş	Unpopulated until 2013
Mardin	Midyat	Yenice	Unpopulated until 2008
Siirt	Eruh	Akmeşe	Unpopulated until 2014
Siirt	Siirt	Bağlıca	Unpopulated until 2011
Siirt	Eruh	Bingöl	Unpopulated until 2010
Siirt	Şirvan	Cevizdalı	Unpopulated until 2008
Siirt	Eruh	Kovanağzı	Unpopulated until 2023
Siirt	Eruh	Narlıdere	Unpopulated until 2024
Siirt	Siirt	Yazlıca	Unpopulated until 2009
Siirt	Eruh	Yanılmaz	Unpopulated until 2009
Şırnak	Güçlükonak	Ağaçyurdu	Unpopulated until 2014
Şırnak	Silopi	Aksu (Assyrian)	Unpopulated until 2019
Şırnak	Cizre	Aşağıdere	Unpopulated until 2025
Şırnak	Şırnak	Atbaşı	Unpopulated until 2011
Şırnak	Şırnak	Bağpınar	Unpopulated until 2018
Şırnak	Güçlükonak	Demirboğaz	Unpopulated until 2011
Şırnak	Beytüşşebap	Doğanyol	Unpopulated until 2016
Şırnak	Şırnak	Kemerli	Unpopulated until 2024
Şırnak	Şırnak	Kırkkuyu	Unpopulated until 2011
Şırnak	Şırnak	Körüklükaya	Unpopulated until 2013
Şırnak	Silopi	Kösreli (Assyrian)	Unpopulated until 2015
Şırnak	İdil	Mağaraköy	Unpopulated until 2011
Şırnak	Güçlükonak	Taşkonak	Unpopulated until 2014
Şırnak	Beytüşşebap	Toptepe	Unpopulated until 2013
Şırnak	Silopi	Selçik	Unpopulated until 2010
Şırnak	Silopi	Yolağzı	Unpopulated until 2019
Şırnak	Şırnak	Cevizdüzü	Unpopulated until 2023
Tunceli	Ovacık	Ağaçpınar	Unpopulated until 2011
Tunceli	Pülümür	Ağaşenliği	Unpopulated until 2008
Tunceli	Pülümür	Akdik	Unpopulated until 2009
Tunceli	Ovacık	Aktaş	Unpopulated until 2014
Tunceli	Pülümür	Altınhüseyin	Unpopulated until 2009
Tunceli	Ovacık	Aşlıca	Unpopulated until 2009
Tunceli	Tunceli	Babaocağı	Unpopulated until 2008
Tunceli	Ovacık	Bilekli	Unpopulated until 2015
Tunceli	Ovacık	Bilgeç	Unpopulated until 2018
Tunceli	Hozat	Boydaş	Unpopulated until 2018
Tunceli	Ovacık	Buzlutepe	Unpopulated until 2010
Tunceli	Pülümür	Çağlayan	Unpopulated until 2008
Tunceli	Tunceli	Çalkıran	Unpopulated until 2008
Tunceli	Ovacık	Çambulak	Unpopulated until 2010
Tunceli	Ovacık	Çatköy	Unpopulated until 2013
Tunceli	Ovacık	Çayüstü	Unpopulated until 2012
Tunceli	Tunceli	Dikenli	Unpopulated until 2013
Tunceli	Tunceli	Dilek	Unpopulated until 2008
Tunceli	Nazımiye	Doğantaş	Unpopulated until 2010
Tunceli	Ovacık	Doludibek	Unpopulated until 2013
Tunceli	Pülümür	Efeağılı	Unpopulated until 2008
Tunceli	Ovacık	Eğimli	Unpopulated until 2012
Tunceli	Ovacık	Eğrikavak	Unpopulated until 2010
Tunceli	Tunceli	Eğriyamaç	Unpopulated until 2008
Tunceli	Ovacık	Elgazi	Unpopulated until 2013
Tunceli	Ovacık	Eskigedik	Unpopulated until 2010
Tunceli	Ovacık	Garipuşağı	Unpopulated until 2014
Tunceli	Tunceli	Gözen	Unpopulated until 2008
Tunceli	Ovacık	Halitpınar	Unpopulated until 2015
Tunceli	Ovacık	Işıkvuran	Unpopulated until 2010
Tunceli	Ovacık	Karataş	Unpopulated until 2011
Tunceli	Pülümür	Kaymaztepe	Unpopulated until 2010
Tunceli	Hozat	Kızılmescit	Unpopulated until 2013
Tunceli	Ovacık	Koruköy	Unpopulated until 2018
Tunceli	Hozat	Kozluca	Unpopulated until 2014
Tunceli	Hozat	Kurukaymak	Unpopulated until 2022
Tunceli	Ovacık	Kuşluca	Unpopulated until 2010
Tunceli	Ovacık	Otlubahçe	Unpopulated until 2013
Tunceli	Tunceli	Pınar	Unpopulated until 2008
Tunceli	Ovacık	Şahverdi	Unpopulated until 2012
Tunceli	Pülümür	Şampaşakaraderbendi	Unpopulated until 2009
Tunceli	Ovacık	Tepsili	Unpopulated until 2011
Tunceli	Ovacık	Yakatarla	Unpopulated until 2011
Tunceli	Ovacık	Yalmanlar	Unpopulated until 2013
Tunceli	Ovacık	Yarımkaya	Unpopulated until 2010
Tunceli	Ovacık	Yoğunçam	Unpopulated until 2014
Tunceli	Hozat	Yüceldi	Unpopulated until 2010
Van	Gürpınar	Bükeç	Unpopulated until 2009

== See also ==
- Kurds in Turkey
- Kurdish villages destroyed during the Iraqi Arabization campaign
- December 2015–February 2016 Cizre curfew
