= Qaraoğlan =

Qaraoğlan may refer to:

- Qaraoğlan, Agdash, a village in Azerbaijan
- Qaraoğlan, Yevlakh, a village in Azerbaijan

== See also ==
- Karaoğlan (disambiguation)
