= Karaoğlan (disambiguation) =

Karaoğlan is a Turkish historical comic book.

Karaoğlan or Karaoglan may also refer to:

== People ==
- Arif Karaoğlan (born 1986), Turkish footballer
- Thomas Karaoglan (born 1993), German singer known as Der Checker

== Places ==
- Karaoğlan, Gölbaşı, a neighbourhood in Ankara Province, Turkey
- Karaoğlan, Mustafakemalpaşa, a neighbourhood in Bursa Province, Turkey
- Karaoğlan, Ovacık, a village in Tunceli Province, Turkey
- Madzhar-Karaoglan or Qaraoğlan, a village and municipality in Yevlakh Rayon, Azerbaijan
- Piraza-Karaoglan or Qaraoğlan, a village and municipality in Agdash Rayon, Azerbaijan
