= Fatih Mehmet Maçoğlu =

Turkish politician (born 1968)

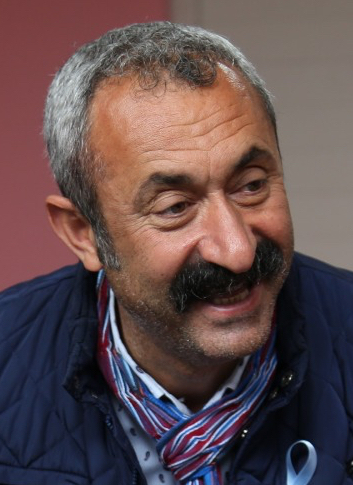

Mayor of Tunceli
- In office 5 April 2019 – 6 April 2024
- Preceded by: Tuncay Sonel
- Succeeded by: Cevdet Konak

Mayor of Ovacık
- In office 2 April 2014 – 3 April 2019
- Preceded by: Mustafa Sarıgül
- Succeeded by: Mustafa Sarıgül

Personal details
- Born: December 20, 1968 (age 57) Çemberlitaş, Ovacık, Tunceli, Turkey
- Party: Communist Party of Turkey

Fatih Mehmet Maçoğlu (Also known as 'The Communist Mayor') (born 20 December 1968, Çemberlitaş, Ovacık District) is a Turkish communist politician of Kurdish descent and founder of Socialist Councils Federation (SMF). He was the mayor of Tunceli, representing the Communist Party of Turkey (TKP), from 2019 to 2024.

== Early life and education ==
He was born in the village of Çemberlitaş in Tunceli Province in December 1968 and attended primary school in Ovacık and health high school in Bingöl.

== Professional career ==
From 1989 onwards he worked in healthcare. First in Bozkir in Konya and between 1992 and 2007 in Pertek, Tunceli. From 2007 onwards he worked in emergency care in the Tunceli state hospital. He resigned from his work in hospital in order to stand as a mayoral candidate for Ovacik in the local elections of 2014.

== Political career ==
He was elected mayor of Ovacık in 2014, where he was known for implementing initiatives like free public transport and agricultural projects such as bee keeping and chickpea cultivation with which the gains supported university students. He also encouraged the opening of several libraries in Ovacık.

In the local elections in 2019, he was elected mayor of Tunceli, the province's capital. During his tenure, he was noted for refusing to use his official car, posted the city council's finances on a banner hung on the front of his office building for transparency, opening a cooperative whose sales from agricultural products funded university students from poor families, and providing free transport for students. He ran for mayor of Kadıköy municipality in the 2024 Istanbul mayoral election, but lost the election.

== Personal life ==
He is married and has two children.
