= Batıayaz, Yayladere =

Village in Bingöl Province, Turkey

Batıayaz
- Village
- Location within Turkey
- Coordinates: 39.197°N 40.107°E
- Country: Turkey
- Province: Bingöl
- District: Yayladere
- Population (2021): 46
- Time zone: UTC+3 (TRT)

Batıayaz (Kurdish: Murun) is a village in the Yayladere District, Bingöl Province, Turkey. The village is populated by Kurds of the Şadiyan tribe and had a population of 46 in 2021.

The hamlets of Kullan and Ova are attached to the village.
