= Aşağıtorunoba, Ovacık =

Village in Tunceli Province, Turkey

Aşağıtorunoba
- Village
- Location within Turkey
- Coordinates: 39.301°N 39.368°E
- Country: Turkey
- Province: Tunceli
- District: Ovacık
- Population (2021): 96
- Time zone: UTC+3 (TRT)

Aşağıtorunoba (Kurdish: Kilmer) is a village in the Ovacık District, Tunceli Province, Turkey. The village is populated by Kurds of the Abasan tribe and had a population of 96 in 2021.

The hamlets of Dumantepe, Söğüt, Yapağı and Yukarıtorunoba are attached to the village.
