= Sinan, Tunceli =

Village in Tunceli Province, Turkey

Sinan
- Village
- Location within Turkey
- Coordinates: 39.1199°N 39.6477°E
- Country: Turkey
- Province: Tunceli
- District: Tunceli
- Population (2021): 67
- Time zone: UTC+3 (TRT)

Sinan (Kurdish: Sêyno) is a village in the Tunceli District, Tunceli Province, Turkey. The village is populated by Kurds of the Alan tribe and had a population of 67 in 2021.

The hamlet of Alatlı is attached to the village.
