= Kızık, Ovacık =

Village in Tunceli Province, Turkey

Kızık
- Village
- Location within Turkey
- Coordinates: 39.309°N 39.090°E
- Country: Turkey
- Province: Tunceli
- District: Ovacık
- Population (2021): 57
- Time zone: UTC+3 (TRT)

Kızık (Kurdish: Qizixe) is a village in the Ovacık District, Tunceli Province, Turkey. The village is populated by Kurds of the Maksudan tribe and had a population of 57 in 2021.

The hamlet of Kürederesi is attached to the village.
