= Yazıören, Ovacık =

Village in Tunceli Province, Turkey

Yazıören
- Village
- Location within Turkey
- Coordinates: 39.418326°N 39.324113°E
- Country: Turkey
- Province: Tunceli
- District: Ovacık
- Population (2021): 22
- Time zone: UTC+3 (TRT)

Yazıören (Kurdish: Velolar) is a village in the Ovacık District, Tunceli Province, Turkey. The village is populated by Kurds of non-tribal affiliation and had a population of 22 in 2021.

The hamlets of Boztaş, Büyükpınar, Diztaş, Kırmızıseki, Sarıçalı and Tatderesi are attached to the village.
