= Uzuntarla, Tunceli =

Village in Tunceli Province, Turkey

Uzuntarla
- Village
- Location within Turkey
- Coordinates: 39.166°N 39.6572°E
- Country: Turkey
- Province: Tunceli
- District: Tunceli
- Population (2021): 78
- Time zone: UTC+3 (TRT)

Uzuntarla (Kurdish: Hegawo Derg) is a village in the Tunceli District, Tunceli Province, Turkey. The village is populated by Kurds of the Demenan tribe and had a population of 78 in 2021.
