= Tüllük, Tunceli =

Village in Tunceli Province, Turkey

Tüllük
- Village
- Location within Turkey
- Coordinates: 39.1698°N 39.5476°E
- Country: Turkey
- Province: Tunceli
- District: Tunceli
- Population (2021): 96
- Time zone: UTC+3 (TRT)

Tüllük (Kurdish: Tûlik, Qaxmut) is a village in the Tunceli District, Tunceli Province, Turkey. The village is populated by Kurds of the Yusufan tribe and had a population of 96 in 2021.

The hamlets of Kemer and Pirtarla are attached to the village.
