= Hanuşağı, Ovacık =

Village in Tunceli Province, Turkey

Hanuşağı
- Village
- Location within Turkey
- Coordinates: 39.288°N 39.064°E
- Country: Turkey
- Province: Tunceli
- District: Ovacık
- Population (2021): 94
- Time zone: UTC+3 (TRT)

Hanuşağı (Kurdish: Xanu) is a village in the Ovacık District, Tunceli Province, Turkey. The village is populated by Kurds of the Bezkar tribe and had a population of 94 in 2021.

The hamlet of Kızılören is attached to the village.
