= Alaçık, Tunceli =

Village in Tunceli Province, Turkey

Alaçık
- Village
- Location within Turkey
- Coordinates: 39.2319°N 39.7282°E
- Country: Turkey
- Province: Tunceli
- District: Tunceli
- Population (2021): 37
- Time zone: UTC+3 (TRT)

Alaçık or Alacık (Kurdish: Roşnek) is a village in the Tunceli District, Tunceli Province, Turkey. The village is populated by Kurds of the Abasan tribe and had a population of 37 in 2021.

The hamlets of Bilgili, Evceğız, Gökağaç, Kanatlı, Karagöl, Köklüce, Ortanca, Sağlık, Subaşı, Yanık, Yapracık, Yazıcık and Ziyaret are attached to the village.
