= Çayağzı, Yayladere =

Village in Bingöl Province, Turkey

Çayağzı
- Village
- Location within Turkey
- Coordinates: 39.100°N 39.949°E
- Country: Turkey
- Province: Bingöl
- District: Yayladere
- Population (2021): 59
- Time zone: UTC+3 (TRT)

Çayağzı (Kurdish: Zimtek) is a village in the Yayladere District, Bingöl Province, Turkey. The village is populated by Kurds of the Şadiyan tribe and had a population of 59 in 2021.

The hamlets of Elmacık, Kabatepe, Kaydibi and Yukarımahalle are attached to the village.
