= Çalıkağıl, Yayladere =

Village in Bingöl Province, Turkey

Çalıkağıl
- Village
- Location within Turkey
- Coordinates: 39.292°N 40.050°E
- Country: Turkey
- Province: Bingöl
- District: Yayladere
- Population (2021): 105
- Time zone: UTC+3 (TRT)

Çalıkağıl (Kurdish: Herdif) is a village in the Yayladere District, Bingöl Province, Turkey. The village is populated by Kurds of the Şadiyan tribe and had a population of 105 in 2021.

Tha hamlets of Alpekmez, Dikilitaş, Dirik, Kayaca, Kel, Kırkağaç, Oymataş, Tekke and Yediveren are attached to the village.

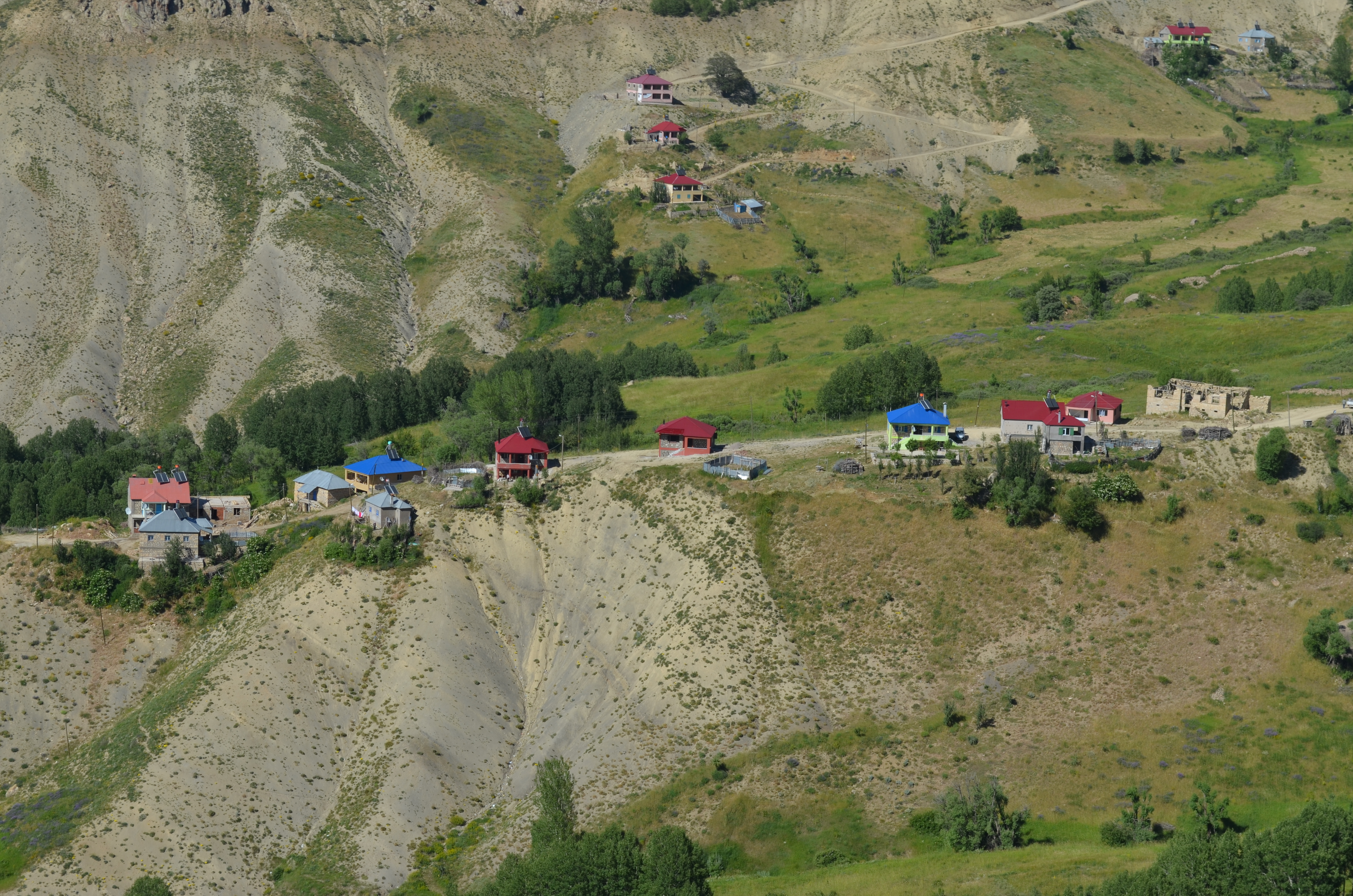
Hamlet of Dikilitaş
