= Mollaaliler, Ovacık =

Village in Tunceli Province, Turkey

Mollaaliler
- Village
- Location within Turkey
- Coordinates: 39.422291°N 39.330910°E
- Country: Turkey
- Province: Tunceli
- District: Ovacık
- Population (2021): 30
- Time zone: UTC+3 (TRT)

Mollaaliler (Kurdish: Milalu) is a village in the Ovacık District, Tunceli Province, Turkey. The village is populated by Kurds of the Aşuran and Kalan tribes and had a population of 30 in 2021.

The hamlets of Bektaş, Duvarcı and Gölbaşı are attached to the village.
