= Yeşilkaya, Tunceli =

Village in Tunceli Province, Turkey

Yeşilkaya
- Village
- Location within Turkey
- Coordinates: 39.1671°N 39.7090°E
- Country: Turkey
- Province: Tunceli
- District: Tunceli
- Population (2021): 52
- Time zone: UTC+3 (TRT)

Yeşilkaya (Kurdish: Gewrek) is a village in the Tunceli District, Tunceli Province, Turkey. The village is populated by Kurds of the Alan tribe and had a population of 52 in 2021.

The hamlets of Çaylı, Düzce, Işık and Tosunlu are attached to the village.
