= Dedeağaç, Tunceli =

Village in Tunceli Province, Turkey

Dedeağaç
- Village
- Location within Turkey
- Coordinates: 39.1695°N 39.5074°E
- Country: Turkey
- Province: Tunceli
- District: Tunceli
- Population (2021): 28
- Time zone: UTC+3 (TRT)

Dedeağaç (Kurdish: Pilvenk) is a village in the Tunceli District, Tunceli Province, Turkey. The village is populated by Kurds of the Pilvenk tribe and had a population of 28 in 2021.

The hamlet of Budaklı is attached to the village.

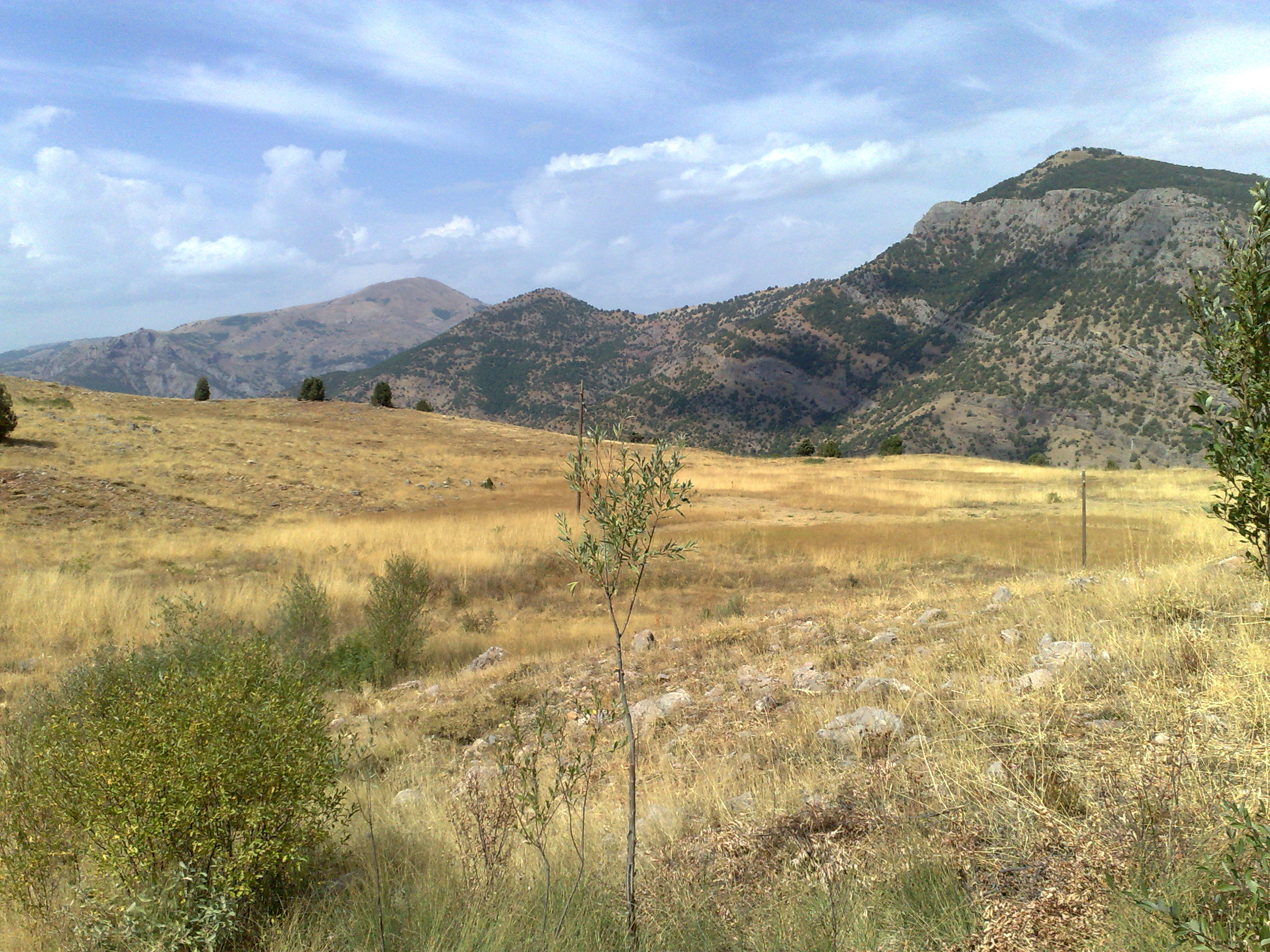
Dedeağaç landscape
