= Karşılar, Tunceli =

Village in Tunceli Province, Turkey

Karşılar
- Village
- Location within Turkey
- Coordinates: 39.175°N 39.441°E
- Country: Turkey
- Province: Tunceli
- District: Tunceli
- Population (2021): 106
- Time zone: UTC+3 (TRT)

Karşılar (Kurdish: Halvorîye) is a village in the Tunceli District, Tunceli Province, Turkey. The village is populated by Kurds of the Abasan tribe and had a population of 106 in 2021.

The hamlets of Ayvacık, Darıca and Elmacık are attached to the village.
