= Yaylagünü, Ovacık =

Village in Tunceli Province, Turkey

Yaylagünü
- Village
- Location within Turkey
- Coordinates: 39.341°N 39.303°E
- Country: Turkey
- Province: Tunceli
- District: Ovacık
- Population (2021): 72
- Time zone: UTC+3 (TRT)

Yaylagünü (Kurdish: Arzumak) is a village in the Ovacık District, Tunceli Province, Turkey. The village is populated by Kurds of the Aslanan tribe and had a population of 72 in 2021.

The hamlets of Çavuşlu, Çayırdüzü, Çolaklar, Kazanç and Tabanlı are attached to the village.
