= Yaylabağ, Yayladere =

Village in Bingöl Province, Turkey

Yaylabağ
- Village
- Location within Turkey
- Coordinates: 39.180°N 40.100°E
- Country: Turkey
- Province: Bingöl
- District: Yayladere
- Population (2021): 16
- Time zone: UTC+3 (TRT)

Yaylabağ (Kurdish: Axdat) is a village in the Yayladere District, Bingöl Province, Turkey. The village is populated by Kurds of the Şadiyan tribe and had a population of 16 in 2021.

The hamlet of Karadiken is attached to the village.
