= Güleç, Tunceli =

Village in Tunceli Province, Turkey

Güleç
- Village
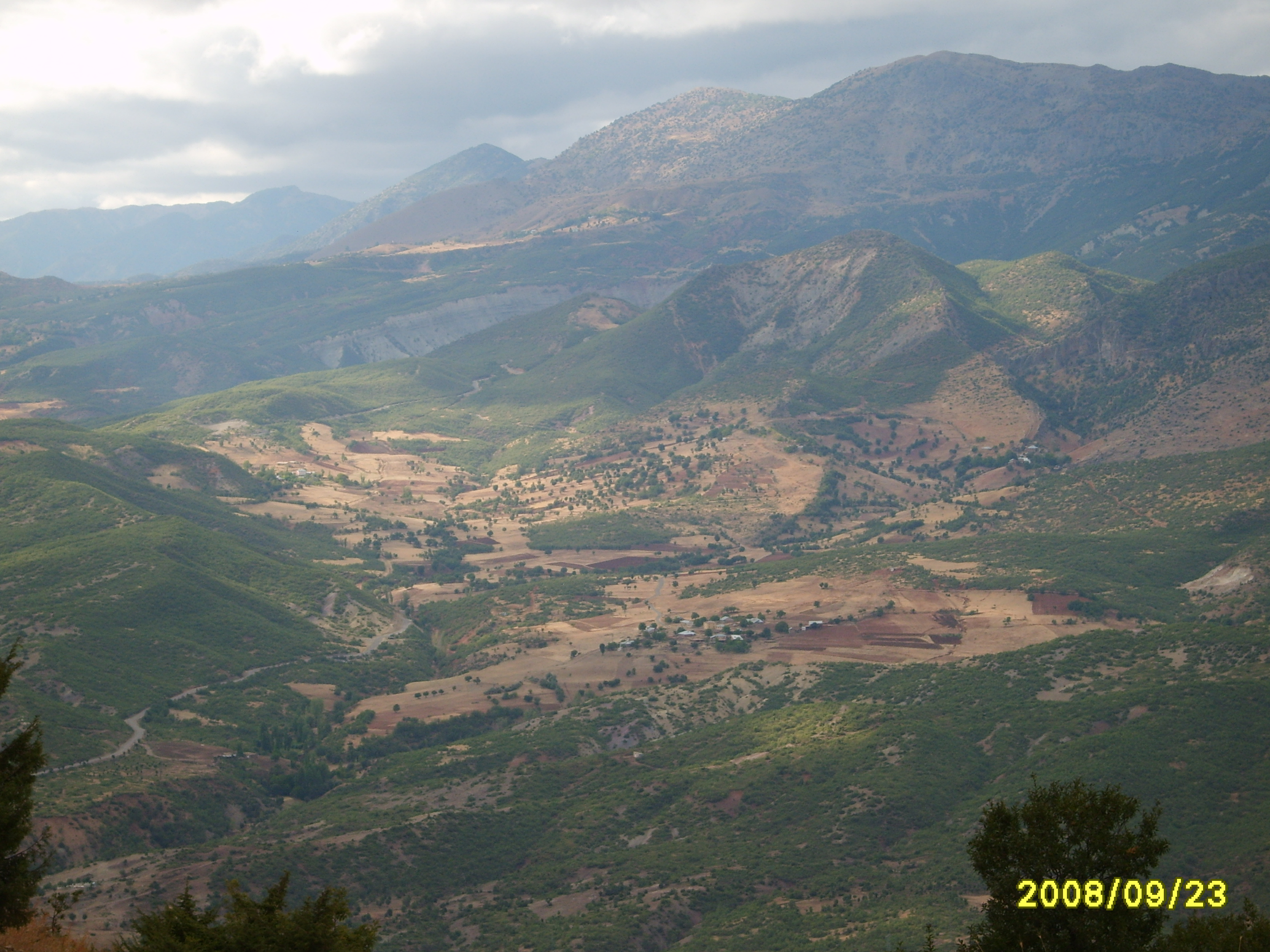

- Location within Turkey
- Coordinates: 39.1567°N 39.5979°E
- Country: Turkey
- Province: Tunceli
- District: Tunceli
- Population (2021): 167
- Time zone: UTC+3 (TRT)

Güleç (Kurdish: Saxsig) is a village in the Tunceli District, Tunceli Province, Turkey. The village is populated by Kurds of the Pilvenk tribe and had a population of 167 in 2021.
