= Sürmelikoç, Yayladere =

Village in Bingöl Province, Turkey

Sürmelikoç
- Village
- Location within Turkey
- Coordinates: 39.098°N 40.009°E
- Country: Turkey
- Province: Bingöl
- District: Yayladere
- Population (2021): 92
- Time zone: UTC+3 (TRT)

Sürmelikoç (Kurdish: Cemîzeynî) is a village in the Yayladere District, Bingöl Province, Turkey. The village is populated by Kurds of the Şadiyan tribe and had a population of 92 in 2021.

The hamlets of Çanaklı, Çay, Koçyurdu and Yellice are attached to the village.

== Geography ==
The village is 90 km away from Bingöl city center and 27 km away from Yayladere district center.
