= Meşeyolu, Tunceli =

Village in Tunceli Province, Turkey

Meşeyolu
- Village
- Location within Turkey
- Coordinates: 39.1552°N 39.7199°E
- Country: Turkey
- Province: Tunceli
- District: Tunceli
- Population (2021): 74
- Time zone: UTC+3 (TRT)

Meşeyolu (Kurdish: Kortan) is a village in the Tunceli District, Tunceli Province, Turkey. The village is populated by Kurds of the Alan tribe and had a population of 74 in 2021.

The hamlets of Kılavuz, Küplüce and Örencik are attached to the village.
