= Batman, Tunceli =

Village in Tunceli Province, Turkey

Batman
- Village
- Location within Turkey
- Coordinates: 39.0936°N 39.5721°E
- Country: Turkey
- Province: Tunceli
- District: Tunceli
- Population (2021): 66
- Time zone: UTC+3 (TRT)

Batman (Kurdish: Korkes) is a village in the Tunceli District, Tunceli Province, Turkey. The village is populated by Kurds of the Kurêşan tribe and had a population of 66 in 2021.

The hamlets of Çatılı, Durak, Erler, Geçimli, Geçit, Haydarlı and Sağ are attached to the village.
