= Yeşilyazı, Ovacık =

Village in Tunceli Province, Turkey

Yeşilyazı
- Village
- Location within Turkey
- Coordinates: 39.334°N 39.087°E
- Country: Turkey
- Province: Tunceli
- District: Ovacık
- Population (2021): 225
- Time zone: UTC+3 (TRT)

Yeşilyazı (Kurdish: Zerenik) is a village in the Ovacık District, Tunceli Province, Turkey. The village is populated by Kurds of the Maksudan tribe and had a population of 225 in 2021.

The hamlet of Dağgece is attached to the village.
