= Çakmaklı, Ovacık =

Village in Tunceli Province, Turkey

Çakmaklı
- Village
- Location within Turkey
- Coordinates: 39.325°N 39.178°E
- Country: Turkey
- Province: Tunceli
- District: Ovacık
- Population (2021): 158
- Time zone: UTC+3 (TRT)

Çakmaklı (Kurdish: Camaliye) is a village in the Ovacık District, Tunceli Province, Turkey. The village is populated by Kurds of the Aslanan tribe and had a population of 158 in 2021.

The hamlets of Boğaz, Meşedibi and Uluca are attached to the village.
