= Geyiksuyu, Tunceli =

Village in Tunceli Province, Turkey

Geyiksuyu
- Village
- Location within Turkey
- Coordinates: 39.163°N 39.381°E
- Country: Turkey
- Province: Tunceli
- District: Tunceli
- Population (2021): 392
- Time zone: UTC+3 (TRT)

Geyiksuyu (Kurdish: Sin) is a village in the Tunceli District, Tunceli Province, Turkey. The village is populated by Kurds of the Kirgan tribe and had a population of 392 in 2021.

The hamlets of Alaca, Karaca and Korgun are attached to the village. A Gendarmerie Special Operations Battalion Command is located in the village.
