= Söğütlü, Ovacık =

Village in Tunceli Province, Turkey

Söğütlü
- Village
- Location within Turkey
- Coordinates: 39.284°N 39.056°E
- Country: Turkey
- Province: Tunceli
- District: Ovacık
- Population (2021): 23
- Time zone: UTC+3 (TRT)

Söğütlü (Kurdish: Viyaleke) is a village in the Ovacık District, Tunceli Province, Turkey. The village is populated by Kurds of the Bezkar tribe and had a population of 23 in 2021.
