= Havuzlu, Ovacık =

Village in Tunceli Province, Turkey

Havuzlu
- Village
- Location within Turkey
- Coordinates: 39.400636°N 39.270222°E
- Country: Turkey
- Province: Tunceli
- District: Ovacık
- Population (2021): 19
- Time zone: UTC+3 (TRT)

Havuzlu (Kurdish: Hopike) is a village in the Ovacık District, Tunceli Province, Turkey. The village is populated by Kurds of non-tribal affiliation and had a population of 19 in 2021.

The hamlets of Arzular and Karataş are attached to the village.
