= Günlük, Yayladere =

Village in Bingöl Province, Turkey

Günlük
- Village
- Location within Turkey
- Coordinates: 39.171°N 40.136°E
- Country: Turkey
- Province: Bingöl
- District: Yayladere
- Population (2021): 49
- Time zone: UTC+3 (TRT)

Günlük (Kurdish: Anzavik) is a village in the Yayladere District, Bingöl Province, Turkey. The village is populated by Kurds of the Şadiyan tribe and had a population of 49 in 2021.

The hamlets of Ölçülü, Örencik and Taşdirek are attached to the village.
