= Gökçek, Tunceli =

Village in Tunceli Province, Turkey

Gökçek
- Village
- Location within Turkey
- Coordinates: 39.1909°N 39.6906°E
- Country: Turkey
- Province: Tunceli
- District: Tunceli
- Population (2021): 65
- Time zone: UTC+3 (TRT)

Gökçek (Kurdish: Sedxano) is a village in the Tunceli District, Tunceli Province, Turkey. The village is populated by Kurds of the Demenan tribe and had a population of 65 in 2021.
