= Konaklar, Ovacık =

Village in Tunceli Province, Turkey

Konaklar
- Village
- Location within Turkey
- Coordinates: 39.352004°N 39.231738°E
- Country: Turkey
- Province: Tunceli
- District: Ovacık
- Population (2021): 49
- Time zone: UTC+3 (TRT)

Konaklar (Kurdish: Konaxu) is a village in the Ovacık District, Tunceli Province, Turkey. The village is populated by Kurds of the Aslanan tribe and had a population of 49 in 2021.
