= Kocalar, Tunceli =

Village in Tunceli Province, Turkey

Kocalar
- Village
- Location within Turkey
- Coordinates: 39.1501°N 39.5743°E
- Country: Turkey
- Province: Tunceli
- District: Tunceli
- Population (2021): 21
- Time zone: UTC+3 (TRT)

Kocalar (Kurdish: Keşîşan) is a village in the Tunceli District, Tunceli Province, Turkey. The village is populated by Kurds of the Arel tribe and had a population of 21 in 2021.
