= Sarıtaş, Tunceli =

Village in Tunceli Province, Turkey

Sarıtaş
- Village
- Location within Turkey
- Coordinates: 39.2629°N 39.5041°E
- Country: Turkey
- Province: Tunceli
- District: Tunceli
- Population (2021): 65
- Time zone: UTC+3 (TRT)

Sarıtaş (Kurdish: Zaxge) is a village in the Tunceli District, Tunceli Province, Turkey. The village is populated by Kurds of the Kirgan tribe and had a population of 65 in 2021.

The hamlets of Ayranlı and Ekindi are attached to the village.
