= Böğürtlen, Tunceli =

Village in Tunceli Province, Turkey

Böğürtlen
- Village
- Location within Turkey
- Coordinates: 38.945°N 39.582°E
- Country: Turkey
- Province: Tunceli
- District: Tunceli
- Population (2021): 143
- Time zone: UTC+3 (TRT)

Böğürtlen (Kurdish: Hafsîg) is a village in the Tunceli District, Tunceli Province, Turkey. The village is populated by Kurds and had a population of 143 in 2021.

The hamlets of Dikence and Karapınar are attached to the village.
