= Burnak, Ovacık =

Village in Tunceli Province, Turkey

Burnak
- Village
- Location within Turkey
- Coordinates: 39.306°N 39.072°E
- Country: Turkey
- Province: Tunceli
- District: Ovacık
- Population (2021): 71
- Time zone: UTC+3 (TRT)

Burnak (Kurdish: Burnaxe) is a village in the Ovacık District, Tunceli Province, Turkey. The village is populated by Kurds of the Qoçan tribe and had a population of 71 in 2021.

The hamlets of Boyunlu, Geçit and Kepenekli are attached to the village.
