= Akyayık, Ovacık =

Village in Tunceli Province, Turkey

Akyayık
- Village
- Location within Turkey
- Coordinates: 39.388°N 39.266°E
- Country: Turkey
- Province: Tunceli
- District: Ovacık
- Population (2021): 49
- Time zone: UTC+3 (TRT)

Akyayık (Kurdish: Merkenk, Solhasan) is a village in the Ovacık District, Tunceli Province, Turkey. The village is populated by Kurds of the Beytan tribe and had a population of 49 in 2021.

The hamlets of Arpacı, Çamlık, Divanederviş, İkizler, Tutumlu and Yürekli are attached to the village.
