= Adaköy, Ovacık =

Village in Tunceli Province, Turkey

Adaköy
- Village
- Location within Turkey
- Coordinates: 39.342396°N 39.112165°E
- Country: Turkey
- Province: Tunceli
- District: Ovacık
- Population (2021): 74
- Time zone: UTC+3 (TRT)

Adaköy (Kurdish: Adî) is a village in the Ovacık District, Tunceli Province, Turkey. The village is populated by Kurds of the Maksudan tribe and had a population of 74 in 2021.

The hamlet of Dağgeçe is attached to the village.
