= Kozluca, Ovacık =

Village in Tunceli Province, Turkey

Kozluca
- Village
- Location within Turkey
- Coordinates: 39.313°N 39.249°E
- Country: Turkey
- Province: Tunceli
- District: Ovacık
- Population (2021): 17
- Time zone: UTC+3 (TRT)

Kozluca (Kurdish: Qolze) is a village in the Ovacık District, Tunceli Province, Turkey. The village is populated by Kurds of the Aslanan tribe and had a population of 17 in 2021.

The hamlets of Akgil, Anneler, Hasanlar, Işıklı, Koçlar, Mahmutlar, Pancarlı, Soğukpınar and Tepe are attached to the village.
