= Baylık, Tunceli =

Village in Tunceli Province, Turkey

Baylık
- Village
- Location within Turkey
- Coordinates: 39.009°N 39.425°E
- Country: Turkey
- Province: Tunceli
- District: Tunceli
- Population (2021): 91
- Time zone: UTC+3 (TRT)

Baylık (Kurdish: Welikan) is a village in the Tunceli District, Tunceli Province, Turkey. The village is populated by Kurds of the Kurêşan tribe and had a population of 91 in 2021.

The hamlets of Demirlibahçe, Gelincik, Karayusuflar and Köklü are attached to the village.
