= Cevizlidere, Ovacık =

Village in Tunceli Province, Turkey

Cevizlidere
- Village
- Location within Turkey
- Coordinates: 39.263°N 39.041°E
- Country: Turkey
- Province: Tunceli
- District: Ovacık
- Population (2021): 42
- Time zone: UTC+3 (TRT)

Cevizlidere (Kurdish: Merxo) is a village in the Ovacık District, Tunceli Province, Turkey. The village is populated by Kurds of the Kalan tribe and had a population of 42 in 2021.

The hamlets of Biçin and Kazaklı are attached to the village.
