= Tahtköy, Tunceli =

Village in Tunceli Province, Turkey

Tahtköy
- Village
- Location within Turkey
- Coordinates: 39.0580°N 39.5379°E
- Country: Turkey
- Province: Tunceli
- District: Tunceli
- Population (2021): 10
- Time zone: UTC+3 (TRT)

Tahtköy (Kurdish: Text) is a village in the Tunceli District, Tunceli Province, Turkey. The village is populated by Kurds of the Kurêşan tribe and had a population of 10 in 2021.

The hamlet of Bozdere is attached to the village.
