= Doludizgin, Tunceli =

Village in Tunceli Province, Turkey

Doludizgin
- Village
- Location within Turkey
- Coordinates: 39.059°N 39.657°E
- Country: Turkey
- Province: Tunceli
- District: Tunceli
- Population (2021): 31
- Time zone: UTC+3 (TRT)

Doludizgin (Kurdish: Tirkel) is a village in the Tunceli District, Tunceli Province, Turkey. The village is populated by Kurds of non-tribal affiliation and had a population of 31 in 2021.

The hamlet of Uzunkavak is attached to the village.
