= Gözeler, Ovacık =

Village in Tunceli Province, Turkey

Gözeler
- Village
- Location within Turkey
- Coordinates: 39.407832°N 39.233615°E
- Country: Turkey
- Province: Tunceli
- District: Ovacık
- Population (2021): 89
- Time zone: UTC+3 (TRT)

Gözeler (Kurdish: Munzur Bawa) is a village in the Ovacık District, Tunceli Province, Turkey. The village is populated by Kurds of the Beytan tribe and had a population of 89 in 2021.

The hamlets of Çayır, Yeniköy and Yılanlı are attached to the village.
