= Yenikonak, Ovacık =

Village in Tunceli Province, Turkey

Yenikonak
- Village
- Location within Turkey
- Coordinates: 39.291432°N 38.890271°E
- Country: Turkey
- Province: Tunceli
- District: Ovacık
- Population (2021): 21
- Time zone: UTC+3 (TRT)

Yenikonak (Kurdish: Havaçor) is a village in the Ovacık District, Tunceli Province, Turkey. The village is populated by Kurds of the Kalan tribe and had a population of 21 in 2021.

The hamlets of Cevizlik, İbrahimler and Mahmutlar are attached to the village.
