= Eğripınar, Ovacık =

Village in Tunceli Province, Turkey

Eğripınar
- Village
- Location within Turkey
- Coordinates: 39.317°N 39.023°E
- Country: Turkey
- Province: Tunceli
- District: Ovacık
- Population (2021): 281
- Time zone: UTC+3 (TRT)

Eğripınar (Kurdish: Bozkira) is a village in the Ovacık District, Tunceli Province, Turkey. The village is populated by Kurds of the Kalan tribe and had a population of 281 in 2021.

The hamlet of Bozkır is attached to the village.
