= Erdoğdu, Tunceli =

Village in Tunceli Province, Turkey

Erdoğdu
- Village
- Location within Turkey
- Coordinates: 39.1481°N 39.6849°E
- Country: Turkey
- Province: Tunceli
- District: Tunceli
- Population (2021): 18
- Time zone: UTC+3 (TRT)

Erdoğdu (Kurdish: Vilê Kaso) is a village in the Tunceli District, Tunceli Province, Turkey. The village is populated by Kurds of the Kurêşan tribe and had a population of 18 in 2021.

The hamlets of Bardak, Bardakkale and Yeşilce are attached to the village.
