= Köklüce, Tunceli =

Village in Tunceli Province, Turkey

Köklüce
- Village
- Location within Turkey
- Coordinates: 39.054°N 39.559°E
- Country: Turkey
- Province: Tunceli
- District: Tunceli
- Population (2021): 41
- Time zone: UTC+3 (TRT)

Köklüce (Kurdish: Qawun) is a village in the Tunceli District, Tunceli Province, Turkey. The village is populated by Kurds of the Kurêşan tribe and had a population of 41 in 2021.

The hamlets of Anayol, Arıcık, Hopik and Karadere are attached to the village.
