= Gürbüzler, Tunceli =

Village in Tunceli Province, Turkey

Gürbüzler
- Village
- Location within Turkey
- Coordinates: 39.1222°N 39.7261°E
- Country: Turkey
- Province: Tunceli
- District: Tunceli
- Population (2021): 66
- Time zone: UTC+3 (TRT)

Gürbüzler (Kurdish: Vankug) is a village in the Tunceli District, Tunceli Province, Turkey. The village is populated by Kurds of the Alan tribe and had a population of 66 in 2021.

The hamlet of Yalnızçam is attached to the village.
