= Buğulu, Tunceli =

Village in Tunceli Province, Turkey

Buğulu
- Village
- Location within Turkey
- Coordinates: 39.060°N 39.427°E
- Country: Turkey
- Province: Tunceli
- District: Tunceli
- Population (2021): 168
- Time zone: UTC+3 (TRT)

Buğulu (Kurdish: Çixêk) is a village in the Tunceli District, Tunceli Province, Turkey. The village is populated by Kurds of the Kurêşan tribe and had a population of 168 in 2021.

The hamlets of Akoluk, Aşağıtarlacık, Bölmeli, Dallı, Doğanca, Güllü, Hacı, Kalemdüzü, Kurutlu, Subaşı, Tosuncuk, Yayıklı and Yukarıtarlacık are attached to the village.
