= Paşadüzü, Ovacık =

Village in Tunceli Province, Turkey

Paşadüzü
- Village
- Location within Turkey
- Coordinates: 39.375478°N 39.194241°E
- Country: Turkey
- Province: Tunceli
- District: Ovacık
- Population (2021): 95
- Time zone: UTC+3 (TRT)

Paşadüzü (Kurdish: Kodî) is a village in the Ovacık District, Tunceli Province, Turkey. The village is populated by Kurds of non-tribal affiliation and had a population of 95 in 2021.
