= Başakçı, Tunceli =

Village in Tunceli Province, Turkey

Başakçı
- Village
- Location within Turkey
- Coordinates: 39.034°N 39.369°E
- Country: Turkey
- Province: Tunceli
- District: Tunceli
- Population (2021): 76
- Time zone: UTC+3 (TRT)

Başakçı (Kurdish: Tap) is a village in the Tunceli District, Tunceli Province, Turkey. The village is populated by Kurds of the Kurêşan tribe and had a population of 76 in 2021.

The hamlets of Aşağıbaşakçı and Fındıklı are attached to the village.
