= Baldan, Tunceli =

Village in Tunceli Province, Turkey

Baldan
- Village
- Location within Turkey
- Coordinates: 39.1689°N 39.5669°E
- Country: Turkey
- Province: Tunceli
- District: Tunceli
- Population (2021): 51
- Time zone: UTC+3 (TRT)

Baldan (Kurdish: Axdat) is a village in the Tunceli District, Tunceli Province, Turkey. The village is populated by Kurds of the Yusufan tribe and had a population of 51 in 2021.
