= Yoncalı, Ovacık =

Village in Tunceli Province, Turkey

Yoncalı
- Village
- Location within Turkey
- Coordinates: 39.332°N 39.365°E
- Country: Turkey
- Province: Tunceli
- District: Ovacık
- Population (2021): 55
- Time zone: UTC+3 (TRT)

Yoncalı (Kurdish: Ortînîk) is a village in the Ovacık District, Tunceli Province, Turkey. The village is populated by Kurds of the Laçin tribe and had a population of 55 in 2021.
