= Yayladere =

Municipality in Bingöl Province, Turkey

- Municipality
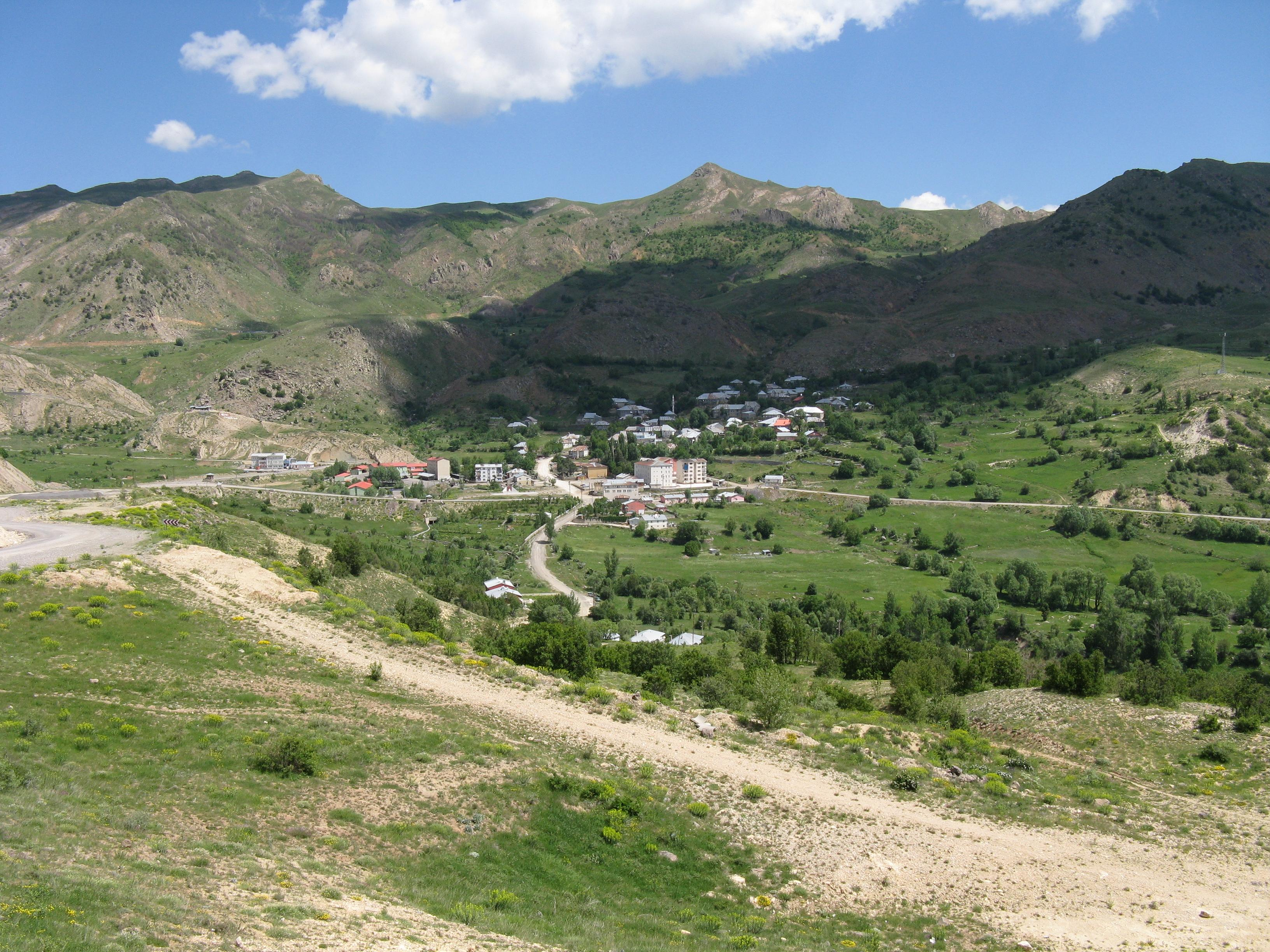

- Location within Turkey
- Coordinates: 39°13′38″N 40°04′08″E
- Country: Turkey
- Province: Bingöl
- District: Yayladere

Government
  - Mayor: Sabri Akyürek (CHP)
- Population (2021): 1,020
- Time zone: UTC+3 (TRT)
- Website: www.yayladere.bel.tr

Yayladere (Kurdish: Xolxol, Armenian: Խոլխոլ, romanized: Kholkhol) is a town and seat of Yayladere District of Bingöl Province in Turkey. The mayor is Sabri Akyürek (CHP).

The town is populated by Kurds of the Şadiyan tribe and had a population of 1,020 in 2021.

== Neighborhoods ==
The town is divided into the neighborhoods of Akçadamlar, Conak, Haktanır, Hasköy, Merkez and Yolgüden.

== History ==
It had previously been a sanjak (district) of the Vilayet of Erzurum.
