= Zeynelli, Yayladere =

Village in Bingöl Province, Turkey

Zeynelli
- Village
- Location within Turkey
- Coordinates: 39.205°N 40.193°E
- Country: Turkey
- Province: Bingöl
- District: Yayladere
- Population (2021): 77
- Time zone: UTC+3 (TRT)

Zeynelli (Kurdish: Zêynan) is a village in the Yayladere District, Bingöl Province, Turkey. The village is populated by Kurds of the Şadiyan tribe and had a population of 77 in 2021.

The hamlets of Ömerler and Vartok are attached to the village.
