= Kopuzlar, Tunceli =

Village in Tunceli Province, Turkey

Kopuzlar
- Village
- Location within Turkey
- Coordinates: 38.9995°N 39.4899°E
- Country: Turkey
- Province: Tunceli
- District: Tunceli
- Population (2021): 165
- Time zone: UTC+3 (TRT)

Kopuzlar (Kurdish: Xosor) is a village in the Tunceli District, Tunceli Province, Turkey. The village is populated by Kurds of the Kurêşan tribe and had a population of 165 in 2021.

The hamlets of Hozan, Karyemez and Varlık are attached to the village.
