= Gömemiş, Tunceli =

Village in Tunceli Province, Turkey

Gömemiş
- Village
- Location within Turkey
- Coordinates: 39.1416°N 39.6788°E
- Country: Turkey
- Province: Tunceli
- District: Tunceli
- Population (2021): 83
- Time zone: UTC+3 (TRT)

Gömemiş (Kurdish: Gomêmişi) is a village in the Tunceli District, Tunceli Province, Turkey. The village is populated by Kurds of the Alan tribe and had a population of 83 in 2021.

The hamlets of Aşağıtaht, Atalar, Bilgili, Kavacık, Taht and Tepearkası are attached to the village.
