= Suvat, Tunceli =

Village in Tunceli Province, Turkey

Suvat
- Village
- Location within Turkey
- Coordinates: 39.1542°N 39.5259°E
- Country: Turkey
- Province: Tunceli
- District: Tunceli
- Population (2021): 18
- Time zone: UTC+3 (TRT)

Suvat (Kurdish: Vanariz) is a village in the Tunceli District, Tunceli Province, Turkey. The village is populated by Kurds of the Yusufan tribe and had a population of 18 in 2021.

The hamlets of Ürünlü, Yoğurtlu, Yoncalı and Yukarısuvat are attached to the village.
