= Dalbasan, Yayladere =

Village in Bingöl Province, Turkey

Dalbasan
- Village
- Location within Turkey
- Coordinates: 39.153°N 39.958°E
- Country: Turkey
- Province: Bingöl
- District: Yayladere
- Population (2021): 91
- Time zone: UTC+3 (TRT)

Dalbasan (Kurdish: Seter) is a village in the Yayladere District, Bingöl Province, Turkey. The village is populated by Kurds of the Kurêşan and Seter tribes and had a population of 91 in 2021.

Tha hamlets of Kutluca and Yukarıseter are attached to the village.
