= Sarıtosun, Ovacık =

Village in Tunceli Province, Turkey

Sarıtosun
- Village
- Location within Turkey
- Coordinates: 39.347972°N 39.249816°E
- Country: Turkey
- Province: Tunceli
- District: Ovacık
- Population (2021): 24
- Time zone: UTC+3 (TRT)

Sarıtosun (Kurdish: Misto) is a village in the Ovacık District, Tunceli Province, Turkey. The village is populated by Kurds of the Aslanan tribe and had a population of 24 in 2021.

The hamlets of Bakraçlı and Bük are attached to the village.
