= Doluküp, Tunceli =

Village in Tunceli Province, Turkey

Doluküp
- Village
- Location within Turkey
- Coordinates: 39.0291°N 39.4248°E
- Country: Turkey
- Province: Tunceli
- District: Tunceli
- Population (2021): 45
- Time zone: UTC+3 (TRT)

Doluküp (Kurdish: Merxo) is a village in the Tunceli District, Tunceli Province, Turkey. The village is populated by Kurds of the Suran tribe and had a population of 45 in 2021.

The hamlets of Ağaçlı and Taşpınar are attached to the village.
