= Çimenli, Tunceli =

Village in Tunceli Province, Turkey

Çimenli
- Village
- Location within Turkey
- Coordinates: 38.914°N 39.579°E
- Country: Turkey
- Province: Tunceli
- District: Tunceli
- Population (2021): 141
- Time zone: UTC+3 (TRT)

Çimenli (Kurdish: Xirnêg) is a village in the Tunceli District, Tunceli Province, Turkey. The village is populated by Kurds of the Maskan tribe and had a population of 141 in 2021.

The hamlets of Çukurbağ and Kalkar are attached to the village.
