= Cılga, Tunceli =

Village in Tunceli Province, Turkey

Cılga
- Village
- Location within Turkey
- Coordinates: 39.0953°N 39.3940°E
- Country: Turkey
- Province: Tunceli
- District: Tunceli
- Population (2021): 92
- Time zone: UTC+3 (TRT)

Cılga (Kurdish: Sirze) is a village in the Tunceli District, Tunceli Province, Turkey. The village is populated by Kurds of the Kurêşan tribe and had a population of 92 in 2021.

The hamlets of Çevlik, Dağ and Esenyurt are attached to the village.
