= Kanoğlu, Tunceli =

Village in Tunceli Province, Turkey

Kanoğlu
- Village
- Location within Turkey
- Coordinates: 38.9893°N 39.5093°E
- Country: Turkey
- Province: Tunceli
- District: Tunceli
- Population (2021): 77
- Time zone: UTC+3 (TRT)

Kanoğlu (Kurdish: Kano) is a village in the Tunceli District, Tunceli Province, Turkey. The village is populated by Kurds of the Kurêşan tribe and had a population of 77 in 2021.
