= Güneşlik, Yayladere =

Village in Bingöl Province, Turkey

Güneşlik
- Village
- Location within Turkey
- Coordinates: 39.207°N 40.172°E
- Country: Turkey
- Province: Bingöl
- District: Yayladere
- Population (2021): 74
- Time zone: UTC+3 (TRT)

Güneşlik (Kurdish: Haftariç) is a village in the Yayladere District, Bingöl Province, Turkey. The village is populated by Kurds of the Şadiyan tribe and had a population of 74 in 2021.

The hamlets of Başparmak and Çaylıca are attached to the village.
