= Arslandoğmuş, Ovacık =

Village in Tunceli Province, Turkey

Arslandoğmuş
- Village
- Location within Turkey
- Coordinates: 39.302°N 39.135°E
- Country: Turkey
- Province: Tunceli
- District: Ovacık
- Population (2021): 31
- Time zone: UTC+3 (TRT)

Arslandoğmuş (Kurdish: Çirpazin) is a village in the Ovacık District, Tunceli Province, Turkey. The village is populated by Kurds of the Maksudan tribe and had a population of 31 in 2021.

The hamlets of Höşgördüm and Hüllükuşağı are attached to the village.
