= Okurlar, Tunceli =

Village in Tunceli Province, Turkey

Okurlar
- Village
- Location within Turkey
- Coordinates: 39.1269°N 39.3757°E
- Country: Turkey
- Province: Tunceli
- District: Tunceli
- Population (2021): 44
- Time zone: UTC+3 (TRT)

Okurlar (Kurdish: Askesore) is a village in the Tunceli District, Tunceli Province, Turkey. The village is populated by Kurds of the Kirgan tribe and had a population of 44 in 2021.
