= Ziyaret, Ovacık =

Village in Tunceli Province, Turkey

Ziyaret
- Village
- Location within Turkey
- Coordinates: 39.330°N 39.061°E
- Country: Turkey
- Province: Tunceli
- District: Ovacık
- Population (2021): 138
- Time zone: UTC+3 (TRT)

Ziyaret (Kurdish: Jare) is a village in the Ovacık District, Tunceli Province, Turkey. The village is populated by Alevi Kurds of the Maksudan tribe and had a population of 138 in 2021.

The hamlet of Saçaklı is attached to the village.
