= Altınyüzük, Tunceli =

Village in Tunceli Province, Turkey

Altınyüzük
- Village
- Location within Turkey
- Coordinates: 39.1237°N 39.3952°E
- Country: Turkey
- Province: Tunceli
- District: Tunceli
- Population (2021): 38
- Time zone: UTC+3 (TRT)

Altınyüzük (Kurdish: Şakak) is a village in the Tunceli District, Tunceli Province, Turkey. The village is populated by Kurds of the Kirgan tribe and had a population of 38 in 2021.

The hamlets of Dikili and Yukarımezra are attached to the village.
