= Aydınlar, Yayladere =

Village in Bingöl Province, Turkey

Aydınlar
- Village
- Location within Turkey
- Coordinates: 39.169°N 40.059°E
- Country: Turkey
- Province: Bingöl
- District: Yayladere
- Population (2021): 47
- Time zone: UTC+3 (TRT)

Aydınlar (Kurdish: Çûx) is a village in the Yayladere District, Bingöl Province, Turkey. The village is populated by Kurds of the Şadiyan tribe and had a population of 47 in 2021.

Tha hamlets of Bölükören, Çavuşlu, Dağarcık, Dursun, Hacı, Pınarcık and Yağmurdere are attached to the village.
