= Isıtma, Ovacık =

Village in Tunceli Province, Turkey

Isıtma
- Village
- Location within Turkey
- Coordinates: 39.314°N 39.127°E
- Country: Turkey
- Province: Tunceli
- District: Ovacık
- Population (2021): 52
- Time zone: UTC+3 (TRT)

Isıtma (Kurdish: Xanku) is a village in the Ovacık District, Tunceli Province, Turkey. The village is populated by Kurds of the Maksudan tribe and had a population of 52 in 2021.
