= Güneykonak, Ovacık =

Village in Tunceli Province, Turkey

Güneykonak
- Village
- Location within Turkey
- Coordinates: 39.353298°N 39.270855°E
- Country: Turkey
- Province: Tunceli
- District: Ovacık
- Population (2021): 82
- Time zone: UTC+3 (TRT)

Güneykonak (Kurdish: Çarkperi) is a village in the Ovacık District, Tunceli Province, Turkey. The village is populated by Kurds of non-tribal affiliation and had a population of 82 in 2021.

The hamlet of Başkaya is attached to the village.
