= Atlantı, Tunceli =

Village in Tunceli Province, Turkey

Atlantı
- Village
- Location within Turkey
- Coordinates: 39.0856°N 39.6049°E
- Country: Turkey
- Province: Tunceli
- District: Tunceli
- Population (2021): 52
- Time zone: UTC+3 (TRT)

Atlantı (Kurdish: Sovayige) is a village in the Tunceli District, Tunceli Province, Turkey. The village is populated by Kurds of different tribal affiliations and had a population of 52 in 2021.

The hamlets of Aşağıatlantı, Duttepe, Gedikli, Güneli, Kutlu, Oluklu, Sandaldere and Sarıçiçek are attached to the village.
