= Kocakoç, Tunceli =

Village in Tunceli Province, Turkey

Kocakoç
- Village
- Location within Turkey
- Coordinates: 39.1182°N 39.6585°E
- Country: Turkey
- Province: Tunceli
- District: Tunceli
- Population (2021): 211
- Time zone: UTC+3 (TRT)

Kocakoç (Kurdish: Pax) is a village in the Tunceli District, Tunceli Province, Turkey. The village is populated by Kurds of the Alan tribe and had a population of 211 in 2021.

The hamlets of Alikahraman, Ballı, Boylu, Güllüce, İbiş, Kale, Karataş (Qarataş), Kayacık, Seyitbey, Tatlıca, Yağlıca, Yapraklı, Yıldızlı and Yürücek are attached to the village.
