= Düzpelit, Tunceli =

Village in Tunceli Province, Turkey

Düzpelit
- Village
- Location within Turkey
- Coordinates: 39.1382°N 39.3543°E
- Country: Turkey
- Province: Tunceli
- District: Tunceli
- Population (2021): 51
- Time zone: UTC+3 (TRT)

Düzpelit (Kurdish: Bornage) is a village in the Tunceli District, Tunceli Province, Turkey. The village is populated by Kurds of the Kirgan tribe and had a population of 51 in 2021.

The hamlets of Avcılar and Tepecik are attached to the village.
