= Ambar, Tunceli =

Village in Tunceli Province, Turkey

Ambar
- Village
- Location within Turkey
- Coordinates: 39.0837°N 39.6441°E
- Country: Turkey
- Province: Tunceli
- District: Tunceli
- Population (2021): 41
- Time zone: UTC+3 (TRT)

Ambar is a village in the Tunceli District, Tunceli Province, Turkey. The village is populated by Kurds of the Alan tribe and had a population of 41 in 2021.

The hamlets of Aşağıgözlü, Kurucu and Özlüce are attached to the village.
