= Öveçler, Ovacık =

Village in Tunceli Province, Turkey

Öveçler
- Village
- Location within Turkey
- Coordinates: 39.341073°N 39.230450°E
- Country: Turkey
- Province: Tunceli
- District: Ovacık
- Population (2021): 29
- Time zone: UTC+3 (TRT)

Öveçler (Kurdish: Kerdiz) is a village in the Ovacık District, Tunceli Province, Turkey. The village is populated by Kurds of the Aslanan tribe and had a population of 29 in 2021.

The hamlet of Yukarıöveçler is attached to the village.
