= Çemçeli, Tunceli =

Village in Tunceli Province, Turkey

Çemçeli
- Village
- Location within Turkey
- Coordinates: 39.0466°N 39.3677°E
- Country: Turkey
- Province: Tunceli
- District: Tunceli
- Population (2021): 50
- Time zone: UTC+3 (TRT)

Çemçeli (Kurdish: Cemceli) is a village in the Tunceli District, Tunceli Province, Turkey. The village is populated by Kurds of the Pilvenk tribe and had a population of 50 in 2021.

The hamlets of Halilpınar and Örtülü are attached to the village.
