= Çikan, Yayladere =

Village in Bingöl Province, Turkey

Çikan
- Village
- Location within Turkey
- Coordinates: 39.159°N 40.078°E
- Country: Turkey
- Province: Bingöl
- District: Yayladere
- Population (2021): 66
- Time zone: UTC+3 (TRT)

Çikan (formerly Doğucak) is a village in the Yayladere District, Bingöl Province, Turkey. The village is populated by Kurds of the Seter tribe and had a population of 66 in 2021.

The hamlets of Bakımlı, Eğrice, Halil and Yıldızlı are attached to the village.
