= Köseler, Ovacık =

Village in Tunceli Province, Turkey

Köseler
- Village
- Location within Turkey
- Coordinates: 39.379094°N 39.165058°E
- Country: Turkey
- Province: Tunceli
- District: Ovacık
- Population (2021): 140
- Time zone: UTC+3 (TRT)

Köseler (Kurdish: Danzig) is a village in the Ovacık District, Tunceli Province, Turkey. The village is populated by Kurds of the Şaman tribe and had a population of 140 in 2021.

The hamlet of Yaylık is attached to the village.
