= Atadoğdu, Tunceli =

Village in Tunceli Province, Turkey

Atadoğdu
- Village
- Location within Turkey
- Coordinates: 39.161°N 39.344°E
- Country: Turkey
- Province: Tunceli
- District: Tunceli
- Population (2021): 54
- Time zone: UTC+3 (TRT)

Atadoğdu (Kurdish: Testage) is a village in the Tunceli District, Tunceli Province, Turkey. The village is populated by Kurds of the Ferhadan tribe and had a population of 54 in 2021.

The hamlets of Bozca, Karakoyun and Yukarı Komu are attached to the village.
