= Karayonca, Ovacık =

Village in Tunceli Province, Turkey

Karayonca
- Village
- Location within Turkey
- Coordinates: 39.323°N 39.109°E
- Country: Turkey
- Province: Tunceli
- District: Ovacık
- Population (2021): 29
- Time zone: UTC+3 (TRT)

Karayonca (Kurdish: Pardî) is a village in the Ovacık District, Tunceli Province, Turkey. The village is populated by Kurds of the Beytan tribe and had a population of 29 in 2021.
