= Kuyluca, Tunceli =

Village in Tunceli Province, Turkey

Kuyluca
- Village
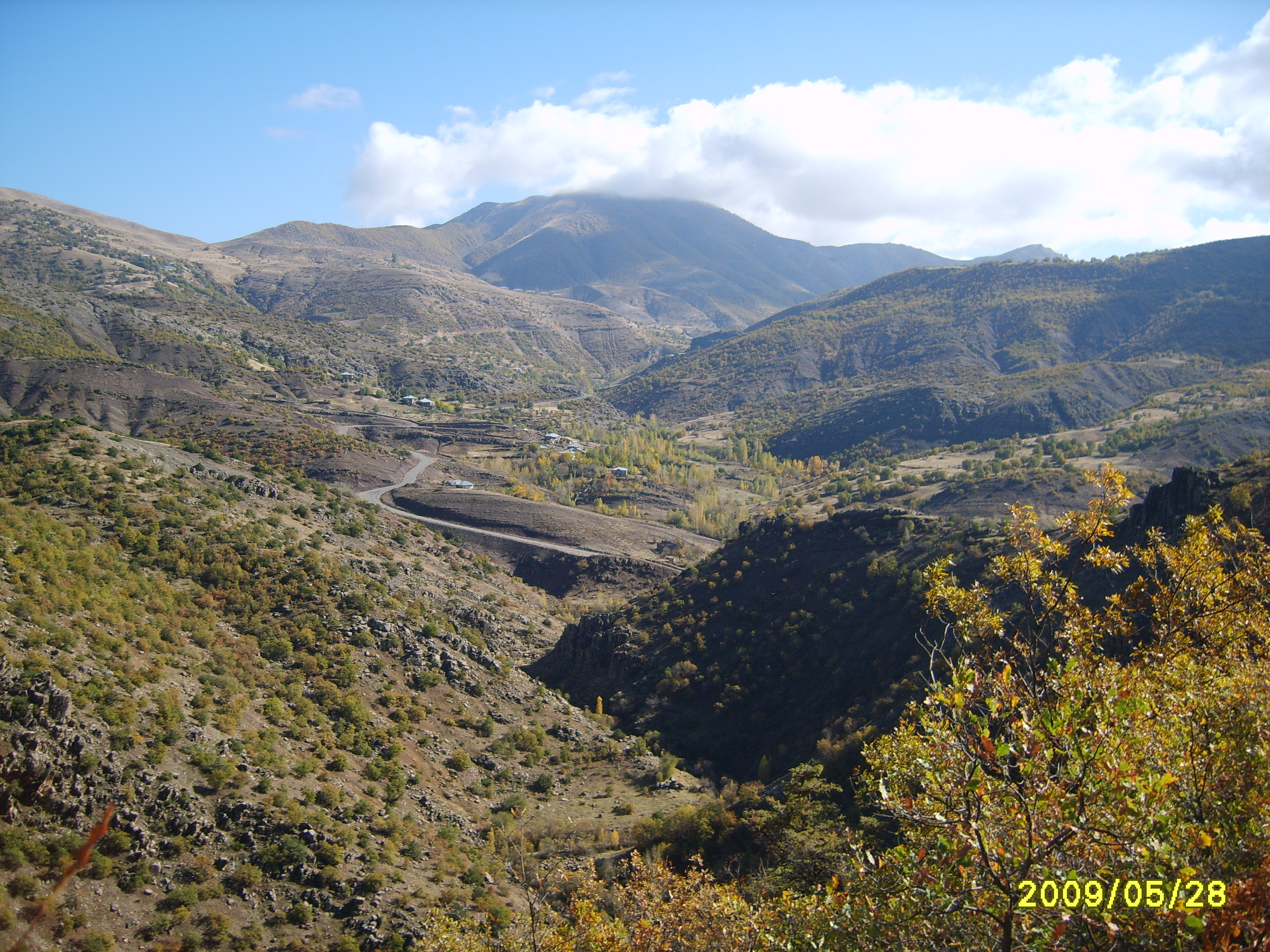

- Location within Turkey
- Coordinates: 39.1615°N 39.6958°E
- Country: Turkey
- Province: Tunceli
- District: Tunceli
- Population (2021): 36
- Time zone: UTC+3 (TRT)

Kuyluca (Kurdish: Putik) is a village in the Tunceli District, Tunceli Province, Turkey. The village is populated by Kurds of the Alan tribe and had a population of 36 in 2021.

The hamlets of Dere, Kapılı, Kırım and Taşburun are attached to the village.
