= Yolkonak, Tunceli =

Village in Tunceli Province, Turkey

Yolkonak
- Village
- Location within Turkey
- Coordinates: 38.9802°N 39.4822°E
- Country: Turkey
- Province: Tunceli
- District: Tunceli
- Population (2021): 109
- Time zone: UTC+3 (TRT)

Yolkonak (Kurdish: Sorpiyan) is a village in the Tunceli District, Tunceli Province, Turkey. The village is populated by Kurds of the Kurêşan tribe and had a population of 109 in 2021.
