= Çemberlitaş, Ovacık =

Village in Tunceli Province, Turkey

Çemberlitaş
- Village
- Location within Turkey
- Coordinates: 39.297°N 39.342°E
- Country: Turkey
- Province: Tunceli
- District: Ovacık
- Population (2021): 16
- Time zone: UTC+3 (TRT)

Çemberlitaş (Kurdish: Gevrik) is a village in the Ovacık District, Tunceli Province, Turkey. The village is populated by Kurds of the Qoçan tribe and had a population of 16 in 2021.

The hamlets of Öğütlü and Yağmur are attached to the village.

== Notable people ==
- Fatih Mehmet Maçoğlu
