= Burmageçit, Tunceli =

Village in Tunceli Province, Turkey

Burmageçit
- Village
- Location within Turkey
- Coordinates: 38.965°N 39.539°E
- Country: Turkey
- Province: Tunceli
- District: Tunceli
- Population (2021): 604
- Time zone: UTC+3 (TRT)

Burmageçit (Kurdish: Şixso) is a village in the Tunceli District, Tunceli Province, Turkey. The village is populated by Kurds of the Kurêşan tribe and had a population of 604 in 2021.
