= Yenisöğüt, Ovacık =

Village in Tunceli Province, Turkey

Yenisöğüt
- Village
- Location within Turkey
- Coordinates: 39.274°N 39.357°E
- Country: Turkey
- Province: Tunceli
- District: Ovacık
- Population (2021): 38
- Time zone: UTC+3 (TRT)

Yenisöğüt (Kurdish: Pozvenk) is a village in the Ovacık District, Tunceli Province, Turkey. The village is populated by Kurds of the Karabal tribe and had a population of 38 in 2021.

The hamlets of Değirmendere, Dervişler and Konak are attached to the village.
