= Çukur, Tunceli =

Village in Tunceli Province, Turkey

Çukur
- Village
- Location within Turkey
- Coordinates: 39.1052°N 39.7020°E
- Country: Turkey
- Province: Tunceli
- District: Tunceli
- Population (2021): 101
- Time zone: UTC+3 (TRT)

Çukur (Kurdish: Çuxure) is a village in the Tunceli District, Tunceli Province, Turkey. The village is populated by Kurds of the Alan tribe and had a population of 101 in 2021.

The hamlets of Alibaba, Aydoğdu, Bozdere, Gölgeli, Güçlü, Konuklu, Köyaltı and Taşoluk are attached to the village.
