= Korlu, Yayladere =

Village in Bingöl Province, Turkey

Korlu
- Village
- Location within Turkey
- Coordinates: 39.182°N 40.155°E
- Country: Turkey
- Province: Bingöl
- District: Yayladere
- Population (2021): 96
- Time zone: UTC+3 (TRT)

Korlu (Kurdish: Şixan) is a village in the Yayladere District, Bingöl Province, Turkey. The village is populated by Kurds of the Şadiyan tribe and had a population of 96 in 2021.

The hamlets of Düğünlü, Eyüphan, Göl, Hacıkomu, Halkalı, İbiş, Kurtuluş, Kuşçular, Ocaklı, Taşlık and Yakalı are attached to the village.
