= Demirkapı, Tunceli =

Village in Tunceli Province, Turkey

Demirkapı
- Village
- Location within Turkey
- Coordinates: 39.084°N 39.3853°E
- Country: Turkey
- Province: Tunceli
- District: Tunceli
- Population (2021): 56
- Time zone: UTC+3 (TRT)

Demirkapı (Kurdish: Xêçe) is a village in the Tunceli District, Tunceli Province, Turkey. The village is populated by Kurds of the Kurêşan tribe and had a population of 56 in 2021.

The hamlets of Deregöl, Yapraklı and Yayalar are attached to the village.
