= Topuzlu, Ovacık =

Village in Tunceli Province, Turkey

Topuzlu
- Village
- Location within Turkey
- Coordinates: 39.301°N 39.064°E
- Country: Turkey
- Province: Tunceli
- District: Ovacık
- Population (2021): 79
- Time zone: UTC+3 (TRT)

Topuzlu (Kurdish: Topize) is a village in the Ovacık District, Tunceli Province, Turkey. The village is populated by Kurds of the Bezkar tribe and had a population of 79 in 2021.

The hamlets of Aydın and Tuzluca are attached to the village.
