= Büyükköy, Ovacık =

Village in Tunceli Province, Turkey

Büyükköy
- Village
- Location within Turkey
- Coordinates: 39.301°N 39.148°E
- Country: Turkey
- Province: Tunceli
- District: Ovacık
- Population (2021): 15
- Time zone: UTC+3 (TRT)

Büyükköy (Kurdish: Dewa Pile) is a village in the Ovacık District, Tunceli Province, Turkey. The village is populated by Kurds of the Maksudan tribe and had a population of 15 in 2021.

The hamlet of Darıca is attached to the village.
