= Yakatarla, Ovacık =

Village in Tunceli Province, Turkey

Yakatarla
- Village
- Location within Turkey
- Coordinates: 39.377°N 39.409°E
- Country: Turkey
- Province: Tunceli
- District: Ovacık
- Population (2021): 36
- Time zone: UTC+3 (TRT)

Yakatarla (Kurdish: Zaruk) is a village in the Ovacık District, Tunceli Province, Turkey. The village is populated by Kurds of the Kalan tribe and had a population of 36 in 2021.

The hamlets of Esenyurt, Koruklu, Örenönü, Terazin, Yarpuzlu and Yeşilyurt are attached to the village.
