= Halitpınar, Ovacık =

Village in Tunceli Province, Turkey

Halitpınar
- Village
- Location within Turkey
- Coordinates: 39.256°N 39.204°E
- Country: Turkey
- Province: Tunceli
- District: Ovacık
- Population (2021): 9
- Time zone: UTC+3 (TRT)

Halitpınar (Kurdish: Xalpinar) is a village in the Ovacık District, Tunceli Province, Turkey. The village is populated by Kurds of the Bahtiyar tribe and had a population of 9 in 2021.

The hamlet of Tokmak is attached to the village.
