= Yalmanlar, Ovacık =

Village in Tunceli Province, Turkey

Yalmanlar
- Village
- Location within Turkey
- Coordinates: 39.369°N 39.580°E
- Country: Turkey
- Province: Tunceli
- District: Ovacık
- Population (2021): 37
- Time zone: UTC+3 (TRT)

Yalmanlar, formerly Lertik, (Kurdish: Kalan) is a village in the Ovacık District, Tunceli Province, Turkey. The village is populated by Kurds of the Kalan tribe and had a population of 37 in 2021.

The hamlets of Abalı, Burmataş, Güvendik, Keçeli, Nazikuşağı and Topaç are attached to the village.
