= Şahverdi, Ovacık =

Village in Tunceli Province, Turkey

Şahverdi
- Village
- Location within Turkey
- Coordinates: 39.446815°N 39.400991°E
- Country: Turkey
- Province: Tunceli
- District: Ovacık
- Population (2021): 30
- Time zone: UTC+3 (TRT)

Şahverdi is a village in the Ovacık District, Tunceli Province, Turkey. The village is populated by Kurds of non-tribal affiliation and had a population of 30 in 2021.

The hamlet of Ahmetuşağı, Eskiköy, Karataş, Sürü and Yağbasan are attached to the village.
