= Pınar, Tunceli =

Village in Tunceli Province, Turkey

Pınar
- Village
- Location within Turkey
- Coordinates: 39.1455°N 39.4387°E
- Country: Turkey
- Province: Tunceli
- District: Tunceli
- Population (2021): 18
- Time zone: UTC+3 (TRT)

Pınar (Kurdish: Dizdan) is a village in the Tunceli District, Tunceli Province, Turkey. The village is populated by Kurds of the Kurêşan tribe and had a population of 18 in 2021.

The hamlet of Kürekli is attached to the village.
