= Bilekkaya, Yayladere =

Village in Bingöl Province, Turkey

Bilekkaya
- Village
- Location within Turkey
- Coordinates: 39.186°N 40.199°E
- Country: Turkey
- Province: Bingöl
- District: Yayladere
- Population (2021): 22
- Time zone: UTC+3 (TRT)

Bilekkaya (Kurdish: Hergep) is a village in the Yayladere District, Bingöl Province, Turkey. The village is populated by Kurds of the Şadiyan tribe and had a population of 22 in 2021.
