= Buzlutepe, Ovacık =

Village in Tunceli Province, Turkey

Buzlutepe
- Village
- Location within Turkey
- Coordinates: 39.235°N 39.140°E
- Country: Turkey
- Province: Tunceli
- District: Ovacık
- Population (2021): 20
- Time zone: UTC+3 (TRT)

Buzlutepe (Kurdish: Kakper) is a village in the Ovacık District, Tunceli Province, Turkey. The village is populated by Kurds of the Laçin tribe and had a population of 20 in 2021.

The hamlets of Delicek, Kışlacık and Topağaç are attached to the village.
