= Kırköy, Yayladere =

Village in Bingöl Province, Turkey

Kırköy
- Village
- Location within Turkey
- Coordinates: 39.288°N 40.125°E
- Country: Turkey
- Province: Bingöl
- District: Yayladere
- Population (2021): 20
- Time zone: UTC+3 (TRT)

Kırköy (Kurdish: Qêr) is a village in the Yayladere District, Bingöl Province, Turkey. The village is populated by Kurds of non-tribal affiliation and had a population of 20 in 2021.

Tha hamlet of Dede, Ekincik, Güreşli, Hamam, İncisu, Kapıbağı, Kaplancık, Sarıyer, Söğütloluk, Şeyh and Yiğitler are attached to the village.
