= Tunceli District =

District of Tunceli Province, Turkey

- District
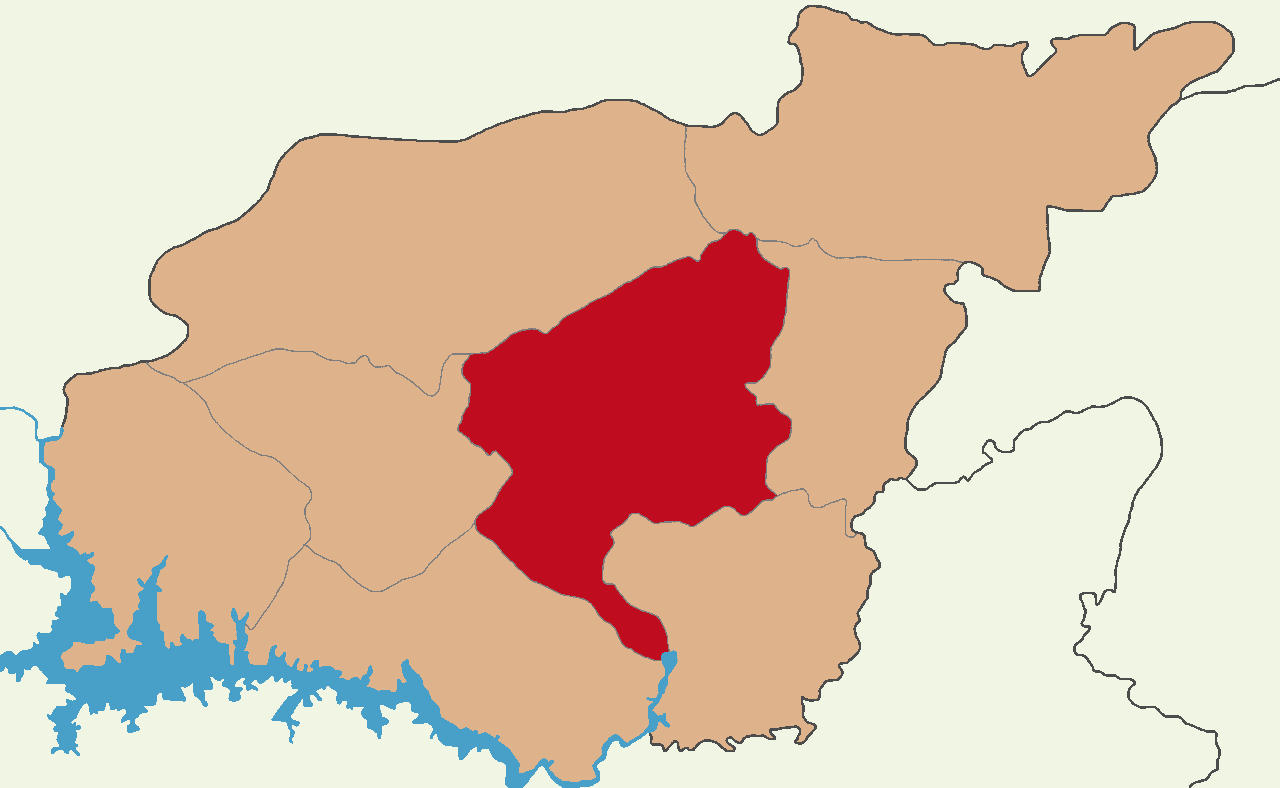
- Map showing Tunceli District in Tunceli Province

- Location in Turkey
- Coordinates: 39°08′N 39°31′E
- Country: Turkey
- Province: Tunceli
- Seat: Tunceli
- Area: 1,128 km^{2} (436 sq mi)
- Population (2021): 39,610
  - Density: 35/km^{2} (91/sq mi)
- Time zone: UTC+3 (TRT)
- Website: www.tunceli.gov.tr

Tunceli District (also: Merkez, meaning "central" in Turkish) is a district of Tunceli Province in Turkey. The town of Tunceli is its seat and the district had a population of 39,610 in 2021. Its area is 1,128 km^{2}.

== Composition ==
Beside the town of Tunceli, the district encompasses fifty-three villages and 156 hamlets.

=== Villages ===
1. Alaçık
2. Altınyüzük
3. Ambar
4. Atadoğdu
5. Atlantı
6. Babaocağı
7. Baldan
8. Başakçı
9. Batman
10. Baylık
11. Böğürtlen
12. Buğulu
13. Burmageçit
14. Cılga
15. Çalkıran
16. Çemçeli
17. Çıralı
18. Çimenli
19. Çukur
20. Dedeağaç
21. Demirkapı
22. Dikenli
23. Dilek
24. Doludizgin
25. Doluküp
26. Düzpelit
27. Eğriyamaç
28. Erdoğdu
29. Geyiksuyu
30. Gökçek
31. Gömemiş
32. Gözen
33. Güleç
34. Gürbüzler
35. Haceri
36. Kanoğlu
37. Karşılar
38. Kocakoç
39. Kocalar
40. Kopuzlar
41. Köklüce
42. Kuyluca
43. Meşeyolu
44. Okurlar
45. Pınar
46. Sarıtaş
47. Sinan
48. Suvat
49. Tahtköy
50. Tüllük
51. Uzuntarla
52. Yeşilkaya
53. Yolkonak
