= Çatalkaya, Yayladere =

Village in Bingöl Province, Turkey

Çatalkaya
- Village
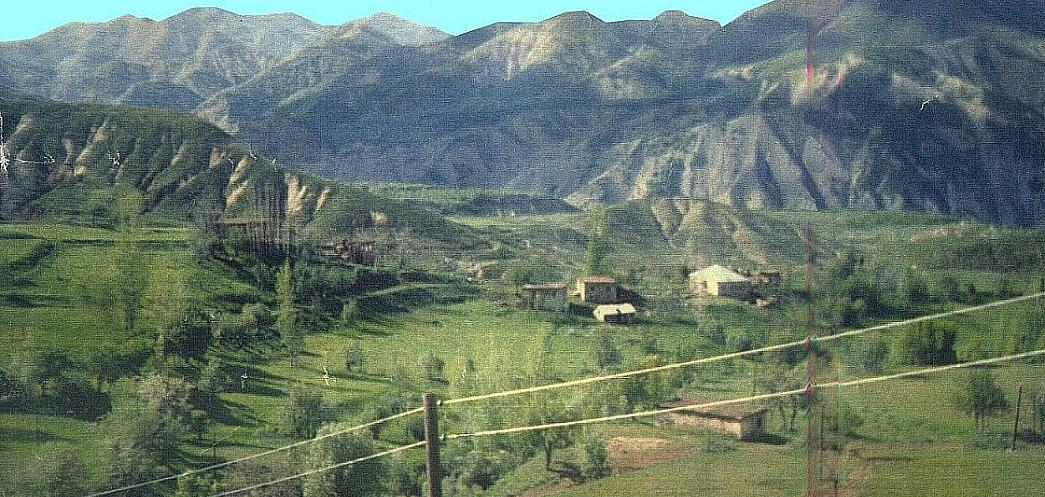

- Location within Turkey
- Coordinates: 39.297°N 40.077°E
- Country: Turkey
- Province: Bingöl
- District: Yayladere
- Population (2021): 26
- Time zone: UTC+3 (TRT)

Çatalkaya (Kurdish: Gumek) is a village in the Yayladere District, Bingöl Province, Turkey. The village is populated by Kurds of the Şadiyan tribe. It had a population of 26 in 2021.

Tha hamlet of Karagöz is attached to the village.
