= Doludibek, Ovacık =

Village in Tunceli Province, Turkey

Doludibek
- Village
- Location within Turkey
- Coordinates: 39.239°N 39.292°E
- Country: Turkey
- Province: Tunceli
- District: Ovacık
- Population (2021): 24
- Time zone: UTC+3 (TRT)

Doludibek (Kurdish: Mamlis) is a village in the Ovacık District, Tunceli Province, Turkey. The village is populated by Kurds of the Laçın tribe and had a population of 24 in 2021.

The hamlets of Aşağıdibek and Çeper are attached to the village.
