= Yarımkaya, Ovacık =

Village in Tunceli Province, Turkey

Yarımkaya
- Village
- Location within Turkey
- Coordinates: 39.430624°N 39.362265°E
- Country: Turkey
- Province: Tunceli
- District: Ovacık
- Population (2021): 53
- Time zone: UTC+3 (TRT)

Yarımkaya (Kurdish: Hemzik) is a village in the Ovacık District, Tunceli Province, Turkey. The village is populated by Kurds of the Kalan tribe and had a population of 53 in 2021.

The hamlets of Aliler, Celaller, Cevizlik, Çağlayan, Çalış, Çürük, Demirtaş, Gülhan and Konak are attached to the village.
