= Dilek, Tunceli =

Village in Tunceli Province, Turkey

Dilek
- Village
- Location within Turkey
- Coordinates: 39.1719°N 39.4751°E
- Country: Turkey
- Province: Tunceli
- District: Tunceli
- Population (2021): 33
- Time zone: UTC+3 (TRT)

Dilek (Kurdish: Sîlîç) is a village in the Tunceli District, Tunceli Province, Turkey. The village is populated by Kurds of the Pilvenk tribe and had a population of 33 in 2021.
