= Işıkvuran, Ovacık =

Village in Tunceli Province, Turkey

Işıkvuran
- Village
- Location within Turkey
- Coordinates: 39.404°N 39.452°E
- Country: Turkey
- Province: Tunceli
- District: Ovacık
- Population (2021): 34
- Time zone: UTC+3 (TRT)

Işıkvuran (Kurdish: Harsi) is a village in the Ovacık District, Tunceli Province, Turkey. The village is populated by Kurds of the Kalan tribe and had a population of 34 in 2021.

The hamlet of Aktaş is attached to the village.
