= Çayüstü, Ovacık =

Village in Tunceli Province, Turkey

Çayüstü
- Village
- Location within Turkey
- Coordinates: 39.347°N 39.385°E
- Country: Turkey
- Province: Tunceli
- District: Ovacık
- Population (2021): 18
- Time zone: UTC+3 (TRT)

Çayüstü (Kurdish: Malmekrek) is a village in the Ovacık District, Tunceli Province, Turkey. The village is populated by Kurds of the Karabal tribe and had a population of 18 in 2021.

The hamlets of Aydınkavak and Söğütözü are attached to the village.
