= Yayladere District =

District of Bingöl Province, Turkey

Coordinates: 39°13′N 40°04′E

- District
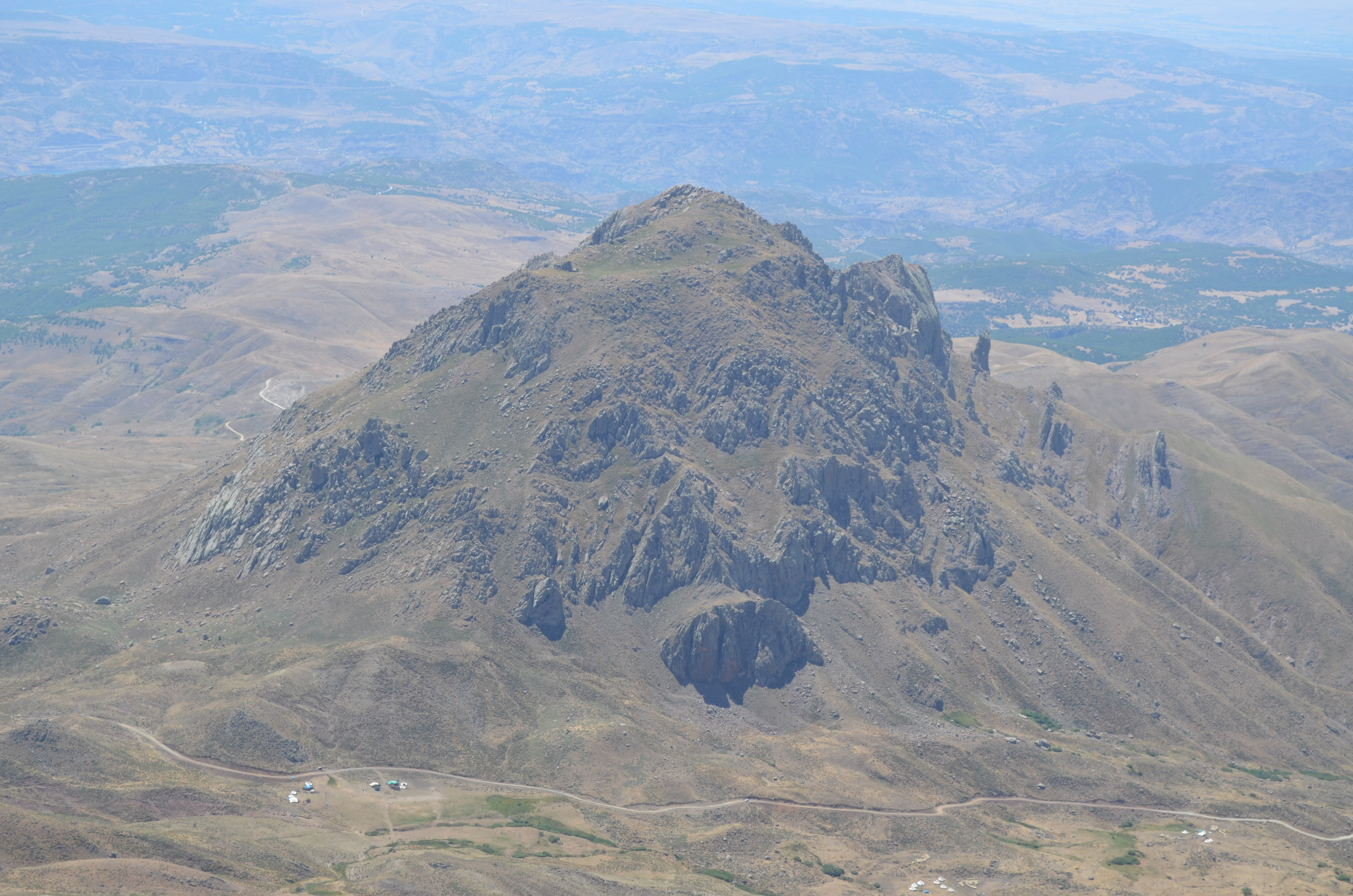
- Tari mountain

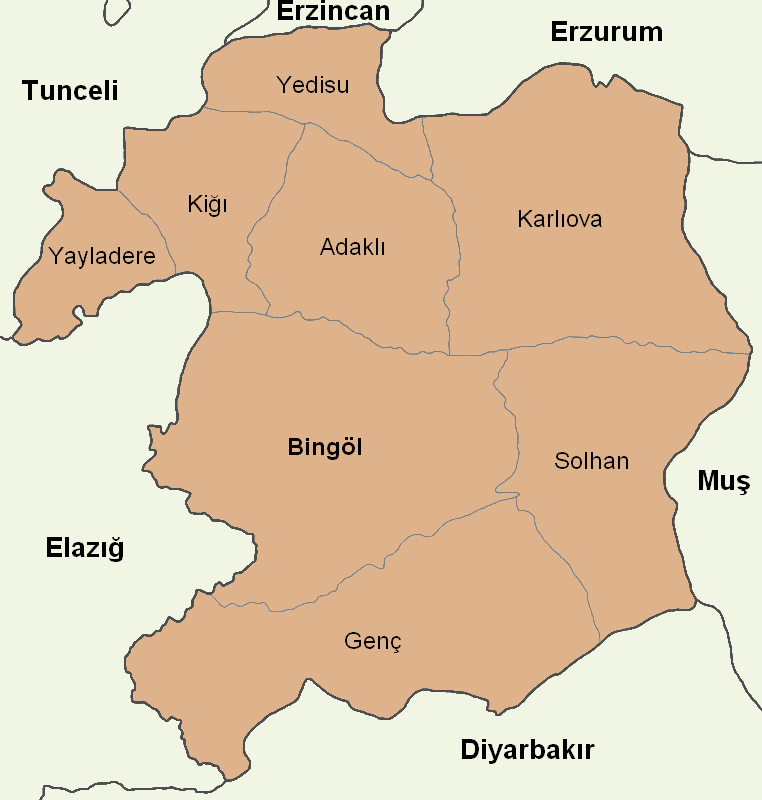
- Map showing Yayladere District in Bingöl Province

- Location within Turkey
- Country: Turkey
- Province: Bingöl
- Seat: Yayladere
- Population (2021): 2,052
- Time zone: UTC+3 (TRT)
- Website: www.yayladere.gov.tr

Yayladere District is a district of Bingöl Province in Turkey. The town of Yayladere is the seat and the district had a population of 2,052 in 2021.

The district was established in 1987.

== Composition ==
Beside the town of Yayladere, the district encompasses twenty villages and seventy-three hamlets.

1. Alınyazı (Hozavit)
2. Aydınlar (Çûx)
3. Batıayaz (Murun)
4. Bilekkaya (Hergep)
5. Boğazköy (Aşuran)
6. Çalıkağıl (Herdif)
7. Çatalkaya (Gumek)
8. Çayağzı (Zimtek)
9. Çikan
10. Dalbasan (Seter)
11. Gökçedal (Deştil)
12. Güneşlik (Haftariç)
13. Günlük (Anzanik)
14. Kalkanlı (Pargesor)
15. Kırköy (Qêr)
16. Korlu (Sixan)
17. Sürmelikoç (Cemîzeynî)
18. Yavuztaş (Taru)
19. Yaylabağ (Axdat)
20. Zeynelli (Zêynan)
