= Yoğunçam, Ovacık =

Village in Tunceli Province, Turkey

Yoğunçam
- Village
- Location within Turkey
- Coordinates: 39.267°N 39.411°E
- Country: Turkey
- Province: Tunceli
- District: Ovacık
- Population (2021): 11
- Time zone: UTC+3 (TRT)

Yoğunçam (Kurdish: Tilek) is a village in the Ovacık District, Tunceli Province, Turkey. The village is populated by Kurds of the Abasan tribe and had a population of 11 in 2021.

The hamlets of Başbudak, Değirmendere, Doğuşlar and Özveren are attached to the village.
