= Eskigedik, Ovacık =

Village in Tunceli Province, Turkey

Eskigedik
- Village
- Location within Turkey
- Coordinates: 39.410°N 39.580°E
- Country: Turkey
- Province: Tunceli
- District: Ovacık
- Population (2021): 25
- Time zone: UTC+3 (TRT)

Eskigedik (Kurdish: Birman) is a village in the Ovacık District, Tunceli Province, Turkey. The village is populated by Kurds of the Kalan tribe and had a population of 25 in 2021.

The hamlets of Akyıldız, Çengelli, Mezraa, Ozan, Salkımlı, Subaşı and Yığınlı are attached to the village.
