= Bilgeç, Ovacık =

Village in Tunceli Province, Turkey

Bilgeç
- Village
- Location within Turkey
- Coordinates: 39.279°N 39.182°E
- Country: Turkey
- Province: Tunceli
- District: Ovacık
- Population (2021): 11
- Time zone: UTC+3 (TRT)

Bilgeç (Kurdish: Bilgec) is a village in the Ovacık District, Tunceli Province, Turkey. The village is populated by Kurds of the Şaman tribe and had a population of 11 in 2021.

The hamlets of Başlamış, Çalbaşı, Dolmataş, Emirganderesi, Karaoğlan, Konak and Sarıoğlan are attached to the village.
