= Çalkıran, Tunceli =

Village in Tunceli Province, Turkey

Çalkıran
- Village
- Location within Turkey
- Coordinates: 39.11427°N 39.4617°E
- Country: Turkey
- Province: Tunceli
- District: Tunceli
- Population (2021): 26
- Time zone: UTC+3 (TRT)

Çalkıran (Kurdish: Çola Hero) is a village in the Tunceli District, Tunceli Province, Turkey. The village is populated by Kurds of the Kurêşan and Yusufan tribes and had a population of 26 in 2021.

The hamlets of Çiçekli and Gökçeler are attached to the village.
