= Ulaş, Dargeçit =

Village in Mardin Province, Turkey

Ulaş
- Neighbourhood
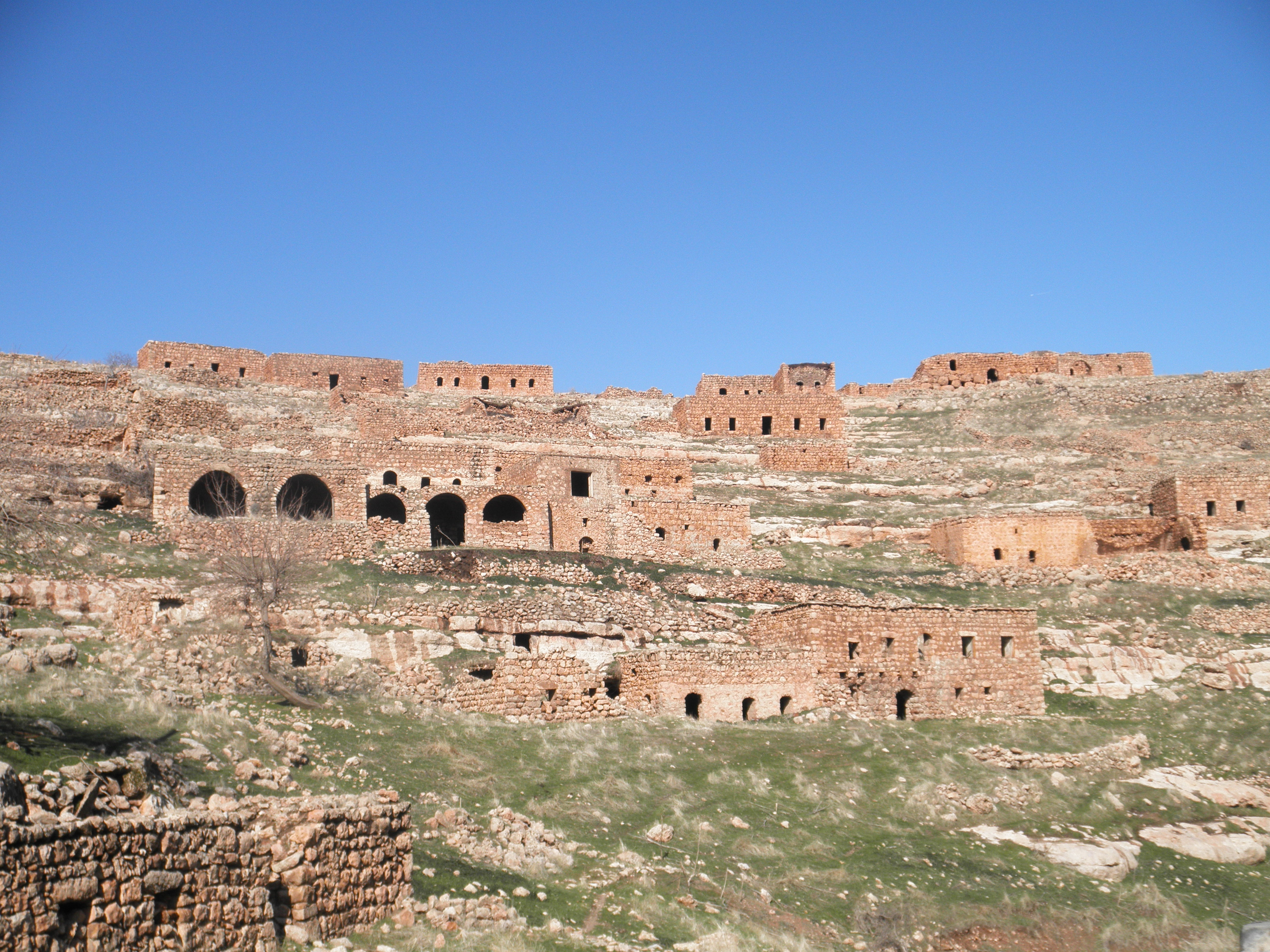

- Location within Turkey
- Coordinates: 37.476°N 41.835°E
- Country: Turkey
- Province: Mardin
- District: Dargeçit
- Population (2021): 36
- Time zone: UTC+3 (TRT)

Ulaş (Kurdish: Dîlan) is a neighbourhood in the municipality and district of Dargeçit, Mardin Province in Turkey. The village is populated by Kurds of the Elîkan tribe and had a population of 36 in 2021.

The village was depopulated by Turkey.
