= Tekağaç, Nusaybin =

Village in Mardin Province, Turkey

Tekağaç
- Neighbourhood
- Location in Turkey
- Coordinates: 37.158°N 41.556°E
- Country: Turkey
- Province: Mardin
- District: Nusaybin
- Population (2022): 23
- Time zone: UTC+3 (TRT)

Tekağaç (Kurdish: Mişavil; Syriac: Morī Šūwōl) is a neighbourhood in the municipality and district of Nusaybin, Mardin Province in Turkey. The village is populated by Yazidi Kurds of the Dasikan tribe and had a population of 23 in 2022.

== History ==
Morī Šūwōl (today called Tekağaç) was historically inhabited by Syriac Orthodox Christians. In the Syriac Orthodox patriarchal register of dues of 1870, it was recorded that the village had five households, who paid twenty-nine dues, and it did not have a church or a priest. The village was unpopulated between 2000 and 2021.

== Demography ==
Population history of the village from 1970 to 2022:

Population
| Year | Pop. | ±% |
|---|---|---|
| 1970 | 168 | — |
| 1980 | 152 | −9.5% |
| 1990 | 148 | −2.6% |
| 2000 | 0 | −100.0% |
| 2007 | 0 | 0.00% |
| 2021 | 0 | 0.00% |
| 2022 | 23 | — |

== Bibliography ==
- Bcheiry, Iskandar (2009). The Syriac Orthodox Patriarchal Register of Dues of 1870: An Unpublished Historical Document from the Late Ottoman Period. Gorgias Press.
- Tan, Altan (2018). Turabidin'den Berriye'ye. Aşiretler - Dinler - Diller - Kültürler (in Turkish). Pak Ajans Yayincilik Turizm Ve Diş Ticaret Limited şirketi. ISBN 9789944360944.
