= Aktaş, Ovacık =

Village in Tunceli Province, Turkey

Aktaş
- Village
- Location within Turkey
- Coordinates: 39.245°N 39.241°E
- Country: Turkey
- Province: Tunceli
- District: Ovacık
- Population (2021): 27
- Time zone: UTC+3 (TRT)

Aktaş (Kurdish: Axtaş) is a village in the Ovacık District, Tunceli Province, Turkey. The village is populated by Kurds of the Bahtiyar tribe and had a population of 27 in 2021.

The hamlets of Beşpınar, Hıdıran, Mollalar and Tepe are attached to the village.
