= Eğimli, Ovacık =

Village in Tunceli Province, Turkey

Eğimli
- Village
- Location within Turkey
- Coordinates: 39.372°N 39.571°E
- Country: Turkey
- Province: Tunceli
- District: Ovacık
- Population (2021): 12
- Time zone: UTC+3 (TRT)

Eğimli (Kurdish: Maraş) is a village in the Ovacık District, Tunceli Province, Turkey. The village is populated by Kurds of the Kalan tribe and had a population of 12 in 2021.

The hamlets of Çokyaşar, Dikenli and Karaca are attached to the village.
