= Aşlıca, Ovacık =

Village in Tunceli Province, Turkey

Aşlıca
- Village
- Location within Turkey
- Coordinates: 39.272°N 39.315°E
- Country: Turkey
- Province: Tunceli
- District: Ovacık
- Population (2021): 19
- Time zone: UTC+3 (TRT)

Aşlıca (formerly Nanikuşağı, Kurdish: Nenuku) is a village in the Ovacık District, Tunceli Province, Turkey. The village is populated by Kurds of the Qoçan tribe and had a population of 19 in 2021.

The hamlets of Çığırcık, Elmacık, Sarısalkım and Yağışlı are attached to the village.
