= Babaocağı, Tunceli =

Village in Tunceli Province, Turkey

Babaocağı
- Village
- Location within Turkey
- Coordinates: 39.1373°N 39.4737°E
- Country: Turkey
- Province: Tunceli
- District: Tunceli
- Population (2021): 29
- Time zone: UTC+3 (TRT)

Babaocağı (Kurdish: Havigpax) is a village in the Tunceli District, Tunceli Province, Turkey. The village is populated by Kurds of the Pilvenk tribe and had a population of 29 in 2021.

The hamlets of Tüllük and Yukarı Tüllük are attached to the village.
