= Kuşluca, Ovacık =

Village in Tunceli Province, Turkey

Kuşluca
- Village
- Location within Turkey
- Coordinates: 39.301°N 39.231°E
- Country: Turkey
- Province: Tunceli
- District: Ovacık
- Population (2021): 19
- Time zone: UTC+3 (TRT)

Kuşluca (Kurdish: Derik) is a village in the Ovacık District, Tunceli Province, Turkey. The village is populated by Kurds of the Qoçan tribe and had a population of 19 in 2021.

The hamlets of Cemallar, Cevizlik and Kavaklık are attached to the village.
