= Karataş, Ovacık =

Village in Tunceli Province, Turkey

Karataş
- Village
- Location within Turkey
- Coordinates: 39.246°N 39.018°E
- Country: Turkey
- Province: Tunceli
- District: Ovacık
- Population (2021): 22
- Time zone: UTC+3 (TRT)

Karataş (Kurdish: Kemere Şa) is a village in the Ovacık District, Tunceli Province, Turkey. The village is populated by Kurds of the Şaman tribe and had a population of 22 in 2021.

The hamlets of Dağgeçe and Karşıyaka are attached to the village.
