= Alınyazı, Yayladere =

Village in Bingöl Province, Turkey

Alınyazı
- Village
- Location within Turkey
- Coordinates: 39.255°N 40.150°E
- Country: Turkey
- Province: Bingöl
- District: Yayladere
- Population (2021): 13
- Time zone: UTC+3 (TRT)

Alınyazı (Kurdish: Hozavit) is a village in the Yayladere District, Bingöl Province, Turkey. The village is populated by Kurds of the Şadiyan tribe and had a population of 13 in 2021.

The hamlet of Kızıl yaylası is attached to the village.
