= Karaoğlan, Ovacık =

Village in Tunceli Province, Turkey

Karaoğlan
- Village
- Location within Turkey
- Coordinates: 39.232°N 39.217°E
- Country: Turkey
- Province: Tunceli
- District: Ovacık
- Population (2021): 30
- Time zone: UTC+3 (TRT)

Karaoğlan (Kurdish: Qerexlan) is a village in the Ovacık District, Tunceli Province, Turkey. The village is populated by Kurds of the Bahtiyar tribe and had a population of 30 in 2021.

The hamlet of Aşağıkaraoğlan is attached to the village.
