= Boğazköy, Yayladere =

Village in Bingöl Province, Turkey

Boğazköy
- Village
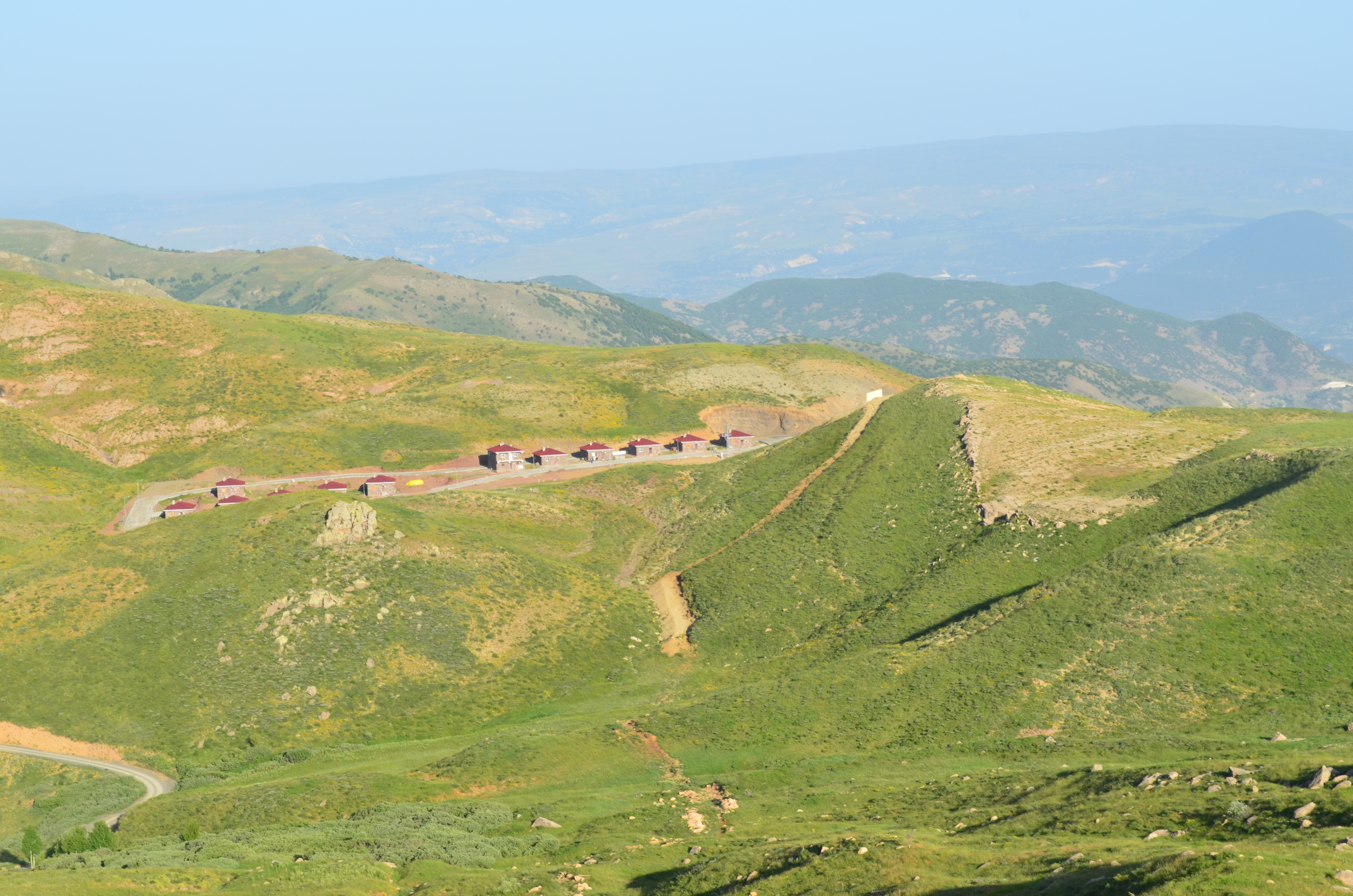

- Location within Turkey
- Coordinates: 39.258°N 40.064°E
- Country: Turkey
- Province: Bingöl
- District: Yayladere
- Population (2021): 13
- Time zone: UTC+3 (TRT)

Boğazköy (Kurdish: Aşuran) is a village in the Yayladere District, Bingöl Province, Turkey. The village is populated by Kurds of the Şadiyan tribe and had a population of 13 in 2021.

The hamlet of Aşuran is attached to the village.
