= Gökçedal, Yayladere =

Village in Bingöl Province, Turkey

Gökçedal
- Village
- Location within Turkey
- Coordinates: 39.237°N 40.130°E
- Country: Turkey
- Province: Bingöl
- District: Yayladere
- Population (2021): 22
- Time zone: UTC+3 (TRT)

Gökçedal (Kurdish: Deştil) is a village in the Yayladere District, Bingöl Province, Turkey. The village is populated by Kurds of the Şadiyan tribe and had a population of 22 in 2021.
