= Gözen, Tunceli =

Village in Tunceli Province, Turkey

Gözen
- Village
- Location within Turkey
- Coordinates: 39.2810°N 39.5487°E
- Country: Turkey
- Province: Tunceli
- District: Tunceli
- Population (2021): 65
- Time zone: UTC+3 (TRT)

Gözen (Kurdish: Îksor) is a village in the Tunceli District, Tunceli Province, Turkey. The village is populated by Kurds of the Abasan tribe and had a population of 65 in 2021.
