= Dikenli, Tunceli =

Village in Tunceli Province, Turkey

Dikenli
- Village
- Location within Turkey
- Coordinates: 39.2280°N 39.3624°E
- Country: Turkey
- Province: Tunceli
- District: Tunceli
- Population (2021): 14
- Time zone: UTC+3 (TRT)

Dikenli (Kurdish: Xaçeliye) is a village in the Tunceli District, Tunceli Province, Turkey. The village is populated by Kurds of the Pilvenk tribe and had a population of 14 in 2021.

The hamlets of Güneşli, Mehmetköy, Soğuksu and Söğütözü are attached to the village.
