= Eğrikavak, Ovacık =

Village in Tunceli Province, Turkey

Eğrikavak
- Village
- Location within Turkey
- Coordinates: 39.304°N 39.184°E
- Country: Turkey
- Province: Tunceli
- District: Ovacık
- Population (2021): 21
- Time zone: UTC+3 (TRT)

Eğrikavak (Kurdish: Kalik) is a village in the Ovacık District, Tunceli Province, Turkey. The village is populated by Kurds of the Şaman tribe and had a population of 21 in 2021.

The hamlet of Bektaşuşağı is attached to the village.
