= Çatköy, Ovacık =

Village in Tunceli Province, Turkey

Çatköy
- Village
- Location within Turkey
- Coordinates: 39.372°N 39.557°E
- Country: Turkey
- Province: Tunceli
- District: Ovacık
- Population (2021): 19
- Time zone: UTC+3 (TRT)

Çatköy (Kurdish: Çet) is a village in the Ovacık District, Tunceli Province, Turkey. The village is populated by Kurds of the Keçelan tribe and had a population of 19 in 2021.

The hamlets of Bahçe, Çakırlı, Kavak, Kızılçayırı and Kömürlü are attached to the village.
