= Yavuztaş, Yayladere =

Village in Bingöl Province, Turkey

Yavuztaş
- Village
- Location within Turkey
- Coordinates: 39.229°N 40.011°E
- Country: Turkey
- Province: Bingöl
- District: Yayladere
- Population (2021): 24
- Time zone: UTC+3 (TRT)

Yavuztaş (Kurdish: Taru) is a village in the Yayladere District, Bingöl Province, Turkey. The village is populated by Kurds of the Kurêşan tribe and had a population of 24 in 2021.

Tha hamlet of Yakınca is attached to the village.
