= Eğriyamaç, Tunceli =

Village in Tunceli Province, Turkey

Eğriyamaç
- Village
- Location within Turkey
- Coordinates: 39.2288°N 39.3900°E
- Country: Turkey
- Province: Tunceli
- District: Tunceli
- Population (2021): 40
- Time zone: UTC+3 (TRT)

Eğriyamaç (Kurdish: Muskirage) is a village in the Tunceli District, Tunceli Province, Turkey. The village is populated by Kurds of the Kirgan tribe and had a population of 40 in 2021.

The hamlets of Değirmendere, Deke, Dere, Doğanay and Dolupınar are attached to the village.
