= Çambulak, Ovacık =

Village in Tunceli Province, Turkey

Çambulak
- Village
- Location within Turkey
- Coordinates: 39.358°N 39.510°E
- Country: Turkey
- Province: Tunceli
- District: Ovacık
- Population (2021): 50
- Time zone: UTC+3 (TRT)

Çambulak (Kurdish: Kirgat) is a village in the Ovacık District, Tunceli Province, Turkey. The village is populated by Kurds of the Kalan tribe and had a population of 50 in 2021.

The hamlets of Akarçay, Balveren, Dirok, Eroğlu, Karaçalı, Köyceğiz, Toptaş and Yapılı are attached to the village.
