= Tepsili, Ovacık =

Village in Tunceli Province, Turkey

Tepsili
- Village
- Location within Turkey
- Coordinates: 39.310°N 39.171°E
- Country: Turkey
- Province: Tunceli
- District: Ovacık
- Population (2021): 17
- Time zone: UTC+3 (TRT)

Tepsili (formerly Mekikuşağı, Kurdish: Mikuku) is a village in the Ovacık District, Tunceli Province, Turkey. The village is populated by Kurds of the Qoçan tribe and had a population of 17 in 2021.
