= Qaraoğlan, Yevlakh =

Qaraoğlan
- Municipality
- Location within Azerbaijan
- Coordinates: 40°39′34″N 47°11′17″E
- Country: Azerbaijan
- Rayon: Yevlakh

Population
  - Total: 1,196
- Time zone: UTC+4 (AZT)
  - Summer (DST): UTC+5 (AZT)

Qaraoğlan (also, Karaoglan and Madzhar-Karaoglan) is a village and municipality in the Yevlakh Rayon of Azerbaijan. It has a population of 1,196.
