= Ovacık District, Tunceli =

District of Tunceli Province, Turkey

Ovacık District
- District
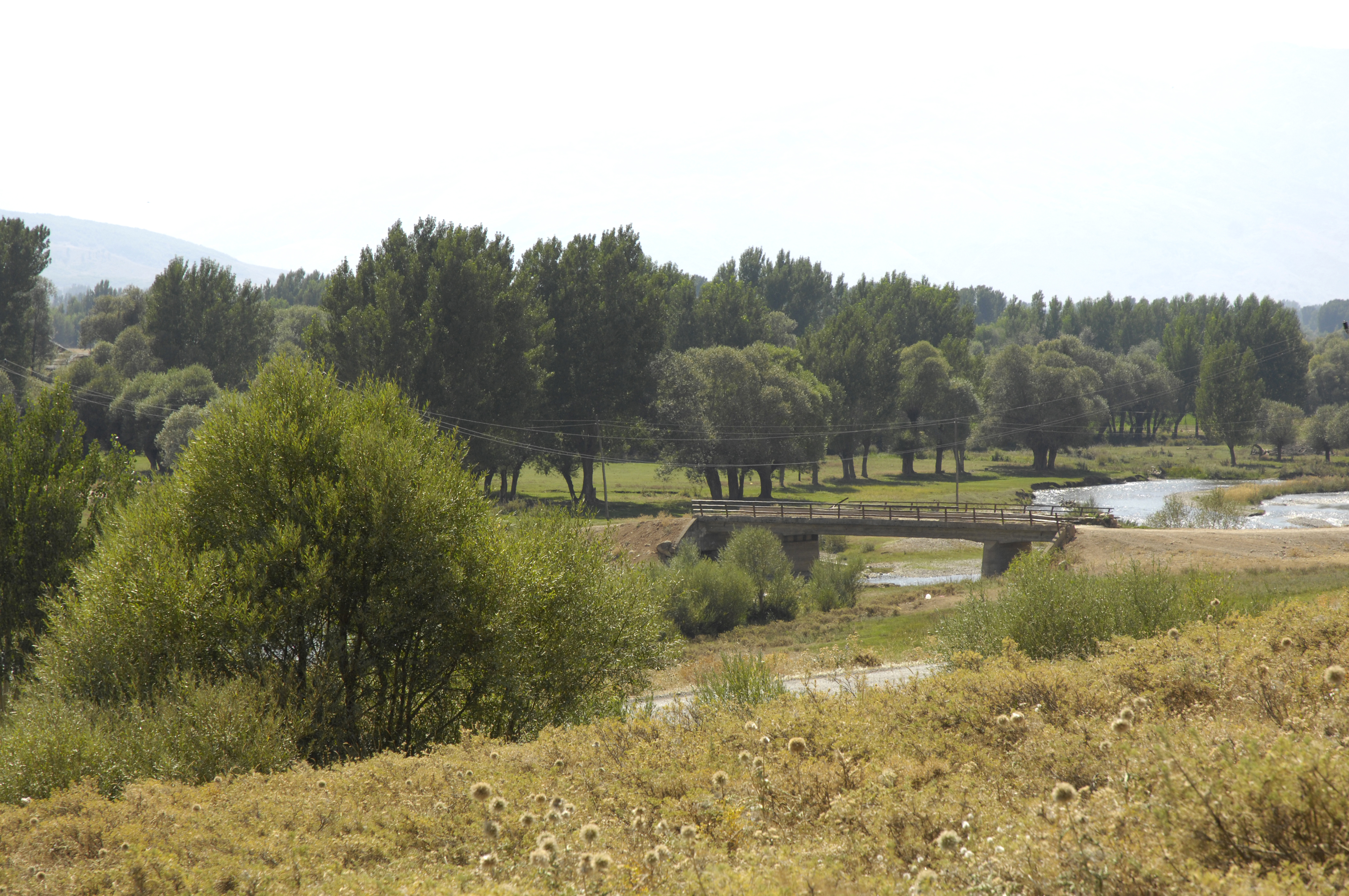

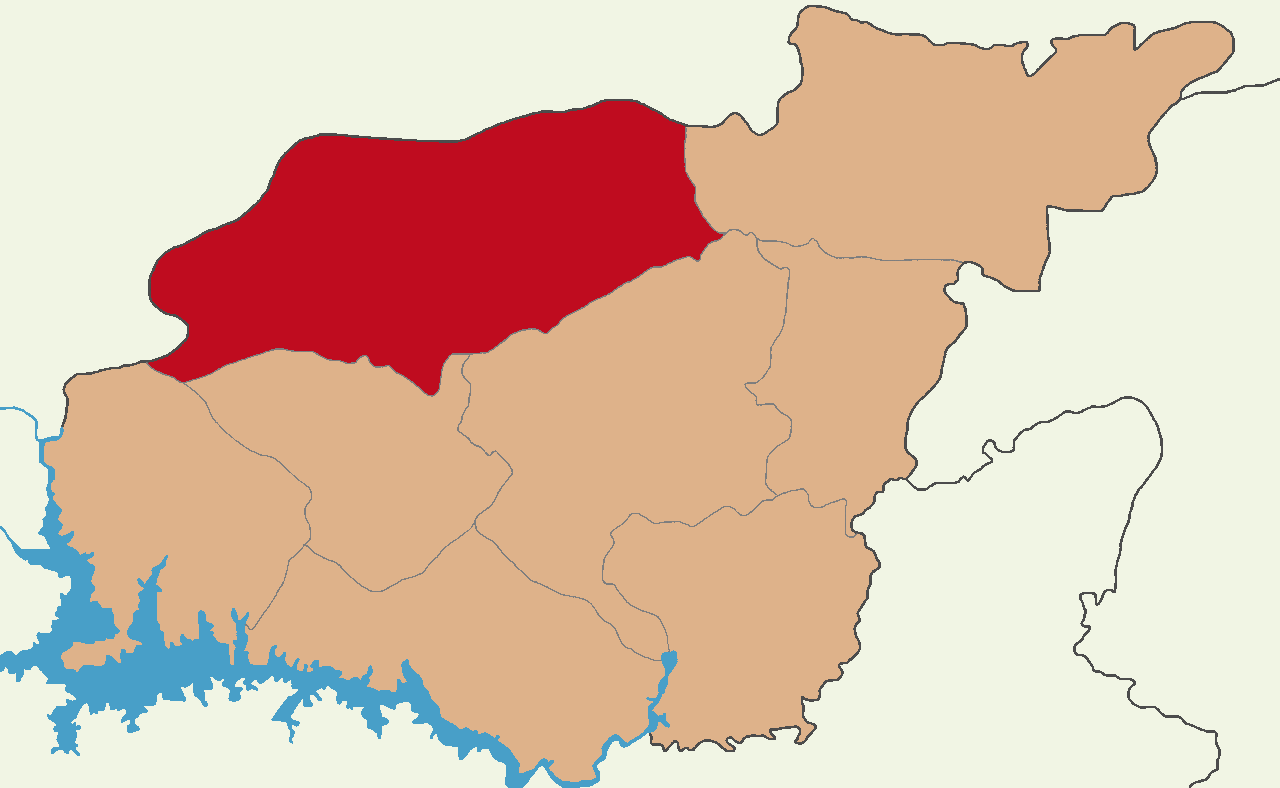
- Map showing Ovacık District in Tunceli Province

- Location within Turkey
- Coordinates: 39°22′N 39°13′E
- Country: Turkey
- Province: Tunceli
- Seat: Ovacık
- Area: 1,401 km^{2} (541 sq mi)
- Population (2021): 6,366
  - Density: 4.544/km^{2} (11.77/sq mi)
- Time zone: UTC+3 (TRT)
- Website: www.tunceliovacik.gov.tr

Ovacık District is a district of Tunceli Province in Turkey. The town of Ovacık is its seat and the district had a population of 6,366 in 2021. Its area is 1,401 km^{2}.

== Composition ==
Beside the town of Ovacık, the district encompasses sixty-two villages and 169 hamlets.

1. Adaköy
2. Ağaçpınar
3. Aktaş
4. Akyayık
5. Arslandoğmuş
6. Aşağıtorunoba
7. Aşlıca
8. Bilgeç
9. Burnak
10. Buzlutepe
11. Büyükköy
12. Cevizlidere
13. Çakmaklı
14. Çambulak
15. Çatköy
16. Çayüstü
17. Çemberlitaş
18. Çöğürlük
19. Doludibek
20. Eğimli
21. Eğrikavak
22. Eğripınar
23. Elgazi
24. Eskigedik
25. Garipuşağı
26. Gözeler
27. Güneykonak
28. Halitpınar
29. Hanuşağı
30. Havuzlu
31. Isıtma
32. Işıkvuran
33. Karaoğlan
34. Karataş
35. Karayonca
36. Kızık
37. Konaklar
38. Koyungölü
39. Kozluca
40. Köseler
41. Kuşluca
42. Mollaaliler
43. Otlubahçe
44. Öveçler
45. Paşadüzü
46. Sarıtosun
47. Söğütlü
48. Şahverdi
49. Tatuşağı
50. Tepsili
51. Topuzlu
52. Yakatarla
53. Yalmanlar
54. Yarımkaya
55. Yaylagünü
56. Yazıören
57. Yenikonak
58. Yenisöğüt
59. Yeşilyazı
60. Yoğunçam
61. Yoncalı
62. Ziyaret
