= Qaraoğlan, Agdash =

Qaraoğlan
- Municipality
- Location within Azerbaijan
- Coordinates: 40°26′46″N 47°21′23″E
- Country: Azerbaijan
- Rayon: Agdash

Population
  - Total: 408
- Time zone: UTC+4 (AZT)
  - Summer (DST): UTC+5 (AZT)

Qaraoğlan (also, Karaoglan and Piraza-Karaoglan) is a village and municipality in the Agdash Rayon of Azerbaijan. It has a population of 408.
