= List of populated places in Tunceli Province =

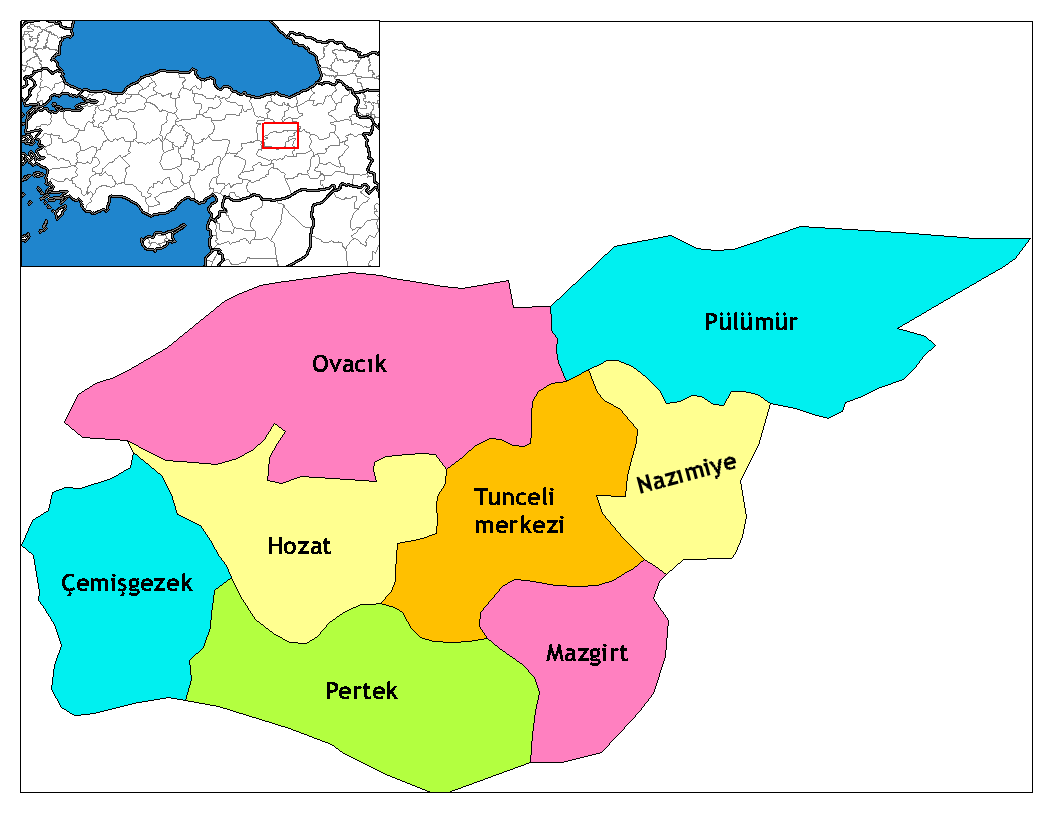
Tunceli Province

Below is the list of populated places in Tunceli Province, Turkey by the districts. In the following lists first place in each list is the administrative center of the district.

== Tunceli ==
- Tunceli
- Aktuluk, Tunceli
- Alacık, Tunceli
- Altınyüzük, Tunceli
- Anbar, Tunceli
- Atadoğdu, Tunceli
- Atlantı, Tunceli
- Babaocağı, Tunceli
- Baldan, Tunceli
- Başakçı, Tunceli
- Batman, Tunceli
- Baylık, Tunceli
- Böğürtlen, Tunceli
- Buğulu, Tunceli
- Burmageçit, Tunceli
- Cılga, Tunceli
- Çalkıran, Tunceli
- Çemçeli, Tunceli
- Çıralı, Tunceli
- Çimenli, Tunceli
- Çukur, Tunceli
- Dedeağaç, Tunceli
- Demirkapı, Tunceli
- Dilek, Tunceli
- Doludizgin, Tunceli
- Doluküp, Tunceli
- Düzpelit, Tunceli
- Eğriyamaç, Tunceli
- Erdoğdu, Tunceli
- Geyiksuyu, Tunceli
- Gökçek, Tunceli
- Gömemiş, Tunceli
- Gözen, Tunceli
- Güdeç, Tunceli
- Güleç, Tunceli
- Gürbüzler, Tunceli
- Kanoğlu, Tunceli
- Karşılar, Tunceli
- Kocakoç, Tunceli
- Kocalar, Tunceli
- Kopuzlar, Tunceli
- Kuyluca, Tunceli
- Meşeyolu, Tunceli
- Okurlar, Tunceli
- Pınar, Tunceli
- Sarıtaş, Tunceli
- Sinan, Tunceli
- Suvat, Tunceli
- Taht, Tunceli
- Tüllük, Tunceli
- Uzuntarla, Tunceli
- Yeşilkaya, Tunceli
- Yolkonak, Tunceli

== Çemişgezek ==
- Çemişgezek
- Akçapınar, Çemişgezek
- Akçayunt, Çemişgezek
- Alakuş, Çemişgezek
- Anıl, Çemişgezek
- Arpaderen, Çemişgezek
- Aşağıbudak, Çemişgezek
- Aşağıdemirbük, Çemişgezek
- Bağsuyu, Çemişgezek
- Bozağaç, Çemişgezek
- Büyükörence, Çemişgezek
- Cebe, Çemişgezek
- Doğan, Çemişgezek
- Doğanalan, Çemişgezek
- Erkalkan, Çemişgezek
- Gedikler, Çemişgezek
- Gözlüçayır, Çemişgezek
- Gülbahçe, Çemişgezek
- Karasar, Çemişgezek
- Kıraçlar, Çemişgezek
- Paşacık, Çemişgezek
- Payamdüzü, Çemişgezek
- Sakyol, Çemişgezek
- Sarıbalta, Çemişgezek
- Tekeli, Çemişgezek
- Toratlı, Çemişgezek
- Ulaklı, Çemişgezek
- Ulukale, Çemişgezek
- Uzungöl, Çemişgezek
- Vişneli, Çemişgezek
- Yemişdere, Çemişgezek
- Yukarıbudak, Çemişgezek
- Yünbüken, Çemişgezek

== Hozat ==
- Hozat
- Akpınar, Hozat
- Alancık, Hozat
- Altınçevre, Hozat
- Balkaynar, Hozat
- Beşelma, Hozat
- Boydaş, Hozat
- Buzlupınar, Hozat
- Çağlarca, Hozat
- Çaytaşı, Hozat
- Çığırlı, Hozat
- Dalören, Hozat
- Dervişcemal, Hozat
- Geçimli, Hozat
- İn, Hozat
- Kalecik, Hozat
- Karabakır, Hozat
- Karaca, Hozat
- Karaçavuş, Hozat
- Kardelen, Hozat
- Kavuktepe, Hozat
- Sarısaltık, Hozat
- Taşıtlı, Hozat
- Türktaner, Hozat
- Uzundal, Hozat
- Yenidoğdu, Hozat
- Yüceldi, Hozat

== Mazgirt ==
- Mazgirt
- Ağaçardı, Mazgirt
- Akdüven, Mazgirt
- Akkavak, Mazgirt
- Akpazar, Mazgirt
- Aktarla, Mazgirt
- Akyünlü, Mazgirt
- Alanyazı, Mazgirt
- Alhan, Mazgirt
- Anıtçınar, Mazgirt
- Aslanyurdu, Mazgirt
- Aşağıoyumca, Mazgirt
- Aşağıtarlacık, Mazgirt
- Ataçınar, Mazgirt
- Avunca, Mazgirt
- Aydınlık, Mazgirt
- Ayvatlı, Mazgirt
- Balkan, Mazgirt
- Beşoluk, Mazgirt
- Beylermezrası, Mazgirt
- Bulgurcular, Mazgirt
- Çatköy, Mazgirt
- Dallıbel, Mazgirt
- Danaburan, Mazgirt
- Darıkent, Mazgirt
- Dayılar, Mazgirt
- Dazkaya, Mazgirt
- Demirci, Mazgirt
- Demirkazık, Mazgirt
- Doğanlı, Mazgirt
- Doğucak, Mazgirt
- Geçitveren, Mazgirt
- Gelincik, Mazgirt
- Gelinpınar, Mazgirt
- Göktepe, Mazgirt
- Güleç, Mazgirt
- Gümüşgün, Mazgirt
- İbimahmut, Mazgirt
- İsmailli, Mazgirt
- Kalaycı, Mazgirt
- Kale, Mazgirt
- Karayusuf, Mazgirt
- Karsan, Mazgirt
- Karşıkonak, Mazgirt
- Kartutan, Mazgirt
- Kavaktepe, Mazgirt
- Kayacı, Mazgirt
- Kepektaşı, Mazgirt
- Kızılcık, Mazgirt
- Kızılkale, Mazgirt
- Koçkuyusu, Mazgirt
- Koyunuşağı, Mazgirt
- Köklüce, Mazgirt
- Kuşaklı, Mazgirt
- Kuşhane, Mazgirt
- Obrukkaşı, Mazgirt
- Obuzbaşı, Mazgirt
- Ortadurak, Mazgirt
- Ortaharman, Mazgirt
- Otlukaya, Mazgirt
- Oymadal, Mazgirt
- Öreniçi, Mazgirt
- Özdek, Mazgirt
- Sarıkoç, Mazgirt
- Sökücek, Mazgirt
- Sülüntaş, Mazgirt
- Temürtaht, Mazgirt
- Yaşaroğlu, Mazgirt
- Yazeli, Mazgirt
- Yeldeğen, Mazgirt
- Yenibudak, Mazgirt
- Yukarıoyumca, Mazgirt

== Nazımiye ==
- Nazımiye
- Aşağıdoluca, Nazımiye
- Ayranlı, Nazımiye
- Ballıca, Nazımiye
- Beytaşı, Nazımiye
- Bostanlı, Nazımiye
- Büyükyurt, Nazımiye
- Çevrecik, Nazımiye
- Dallıbahçe, Nazımiye
- Demirce, Nazımiye
- Dereova, Nazımiye
- Doğantaş, Nazımiye
- Geriş, Nazımiye
- Güneycik, Nazımiye
- Günlüce, Nazımiye
- Güzelpınar, Nazımiye
- Kapıbaşı, Nazımiye
- Kılköy, Nazımiye
- Ramazan, Nazımiye
- Sapköy, Nazımiye
- Sarıyayla, Nazımiye
- Turnayolu, Nazımiye
- Yayıkağıl, Nazımiye
- Yazgeldi, Nazımiye
- Yiğitler, Nazımiye
- Yukarıdoluca, Nazımiye

== Ovacık ==
- Ovacık
- Ada, Ovacık
- Akyayık, Ovacık
- Arslandoğmuş, Ovacık
- Aşağıtorunoba, Ovacık
- Aşlıca, Ovacık
- Bilgeç, Ovacık
- Burnak, Ovacık
- Buzlutepe, Ovacık
- Büyükköy, Ovacık
- Cevizlidere, Ovacık
- Çakmaklı, Ovacık
- Çambulak, Ovacık
- Çemberlitaş, Ovacık
- Çöğürlük, Ovacık
- Eğrikavak, Ovacık
- Eğripınar, Ovacık
- Eskigedik, Ovacık
- Gözeler, Ovacık
- Güneykonak, Ovacık
- Hanuşağı, Ovacık
- Havuzlu, Ovacık
- Isıtma, Ovacık
- Işıkvuran, Ovacık
- Karayonca, Ovacık
- Kızık, Ovacık
- Konaklar, Ovacık
- Koyungölü, Ovacık
- Kozluca, Ovacık
- Köseler, Ovacık
- Kuşluca, Ovacık
- Mollaaliler, Ovacık
- Öveçler, Ovacık
- Paşadüzü, Ovacık
- Sarıtosun, Ovacık
- Söğütlü, Ovacık
- Tatuşağı, Ovacık
- Topuzlu, Ovacık
- Yarımkaya, Ovacık
- Yaylagünü, Ovacık
- Yazıören, Ovacık
- Yenikonak, Ovacık
- Yenisöğüt, Ovacık
- Yeşilyazı, Ovacık
- Yoncalı, Ovacık
- Ziyaret, Ovacık

== Pertek ==
- Pertek
- Akdemir, Pertek
- Ardıç, Pertek
- Arpalı, Pertek
- Aşağıgülbahçe, Pertek
- Ayazpınar, Pertek
- Bakırlı, Pertek
- Ballıdut, Pertek
- Beydamı, Pertek
- Biçmekaya, Pertek
- Bulgurtepe, Pertek
- Çakırbahçe, Pertek
- Çalıözü, Pertek
- Çataksu, Pertek
- Çukurca, Pertek
- Demirsaban, Pertek
- Dere, Pertek
- Dereli, Pertek
- Dorutay, Pertek
- Elmakaşı, Pertek
- Geçityaka, Pertek
- Gövdeli, Pertek
- Günboğazı, Pertek
- Kaçarlar, Pertek
- Karagüney, Pertek
- Kayabağ, Pertek
- Kazılı, Pertek
- Koçpınar, Pertek
- Kolankaya, Pertek
- Konaklar, Pertek
- Konurat, Pertek
- Korluca, Pertek
- Mercimek, Pertek
- Pınarlar, Pertek
- Pirinççi, Pertek
- Sağman, Pertek
- Söğütlütepe, Pertek
- Sumak, Pertek
- Sürgüç, Pertek
- Tozkoparan, Pertek
- Ulupınar, Pertek
- Yalınkaya, Pertek
- Yamaçoba, Pertek
- Yeniköy, Pertek
- Yukarıgülbahçe, Pertek
- Yukarıyakabaşı, Pertek

== Pülümür ==
- Pülümür
- Ağaşenlik, Pülümür
- Akdik, Pülümür
- Altunhüseyin, Pülümür
- Ardıçlı, Pülümür
- Bardakçı, Pülümür
- Başkalecik, Pülümür
- Boğalı, Pülümür
- Bozağakaraderbent, Pülümür
- Çağlayan, Pülümür
- Çakırkaya, Pülümür
- Çobanyıldızı, Pülümür
- Dağbek, Pülümür
- Dağyolu, Pülümür
- Dereboyu, Pülümür
- Dereköy, Pülümür
- Derindere, Pülümür
- Doğanpınar, Pülümür
- Efeağılı, Pülümür
- Elmalı, Pülümür
- Göcenek, Pülümür
- Gökçekonak, Pülümür
- Hacılı, Pülümür
- Hasangazi, Pülümür
- Kabadal, Pülümür
- Kangallı, Pülümür
- Karagöz, Pülümür
- Kayırlar, Pülümür
- Kaymaztepe, Pülümür
- Kırdım, Pülümür
- Kırklar, Pülümür
- Kırkmeşe, Pülümür
- Kocatepe, Pülümür
- Kovuklu, Pülümür
- Közlüce, Pülümür
- Kuzulca, Pülümür
- Mezra, Pülümür
- Nohutlu, Pülümür
- Sağlamtaş, Pülümür
- Salkımözü, Pülümür
- Sarıgül, Pülümür
- Senek, Pülümür
- Süleymanuşağı, Pülümür
- Şampaşakaraderbent, Pülümür
- Taşlık, Pülümür
- Turnadere, Pülümür
- Üçdam, Pülümür
- Ünveren, Pülümür
- Yarbaşı, Pülümür
