= Diyar Dersim =

Hozan Diyar
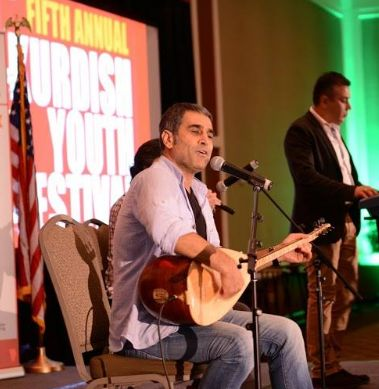

Background information
- Born: Diyar Yıldırım; December 1, 1966 (age 59); Mazgirt, Tunceli, Turkey
- Origin: Kurds
- Genres: Kurdish music
- Occupation: Musician
- Instrument: Saz
- Years active: 1998-present
- Labels: Deutsch-Kurdisches Kulturstintut

Diyar Yıldırım knows as Diyar Dersim (born 1966, 1 December) is a Kurdish singer. During 2015 Turkey general elections, he supports HDP, pro-Kurdish party in Turkey, He sings with the party cochairman Selahattin Demirtaş as a part of campaigning the election.

== Life and career ==
Diyar, He was born on December 1, 1966, in Ayvatlı village of Mazgirt district of Tunceli as a child of a family of Kurdish origin. After completing primary, secondary and high school, he settled in Germany due to political problems. He met the Koma Berxwedan group in Germany. He then continued his musical career as a single.

Diyar participated in many concerts in several countries and regions such as in Rojava, Iraqi Kurdistan, Sweden, and United States.

== Albums ==
- Karwan (Kervan) 1992
- Cenga Jînê (Life War) 1997
- Wey Dinyayê (Wow World) 1999
- Gulê Neçe (Don't go my rose), 2002
- Natirsim (I don't fear)
- Oxir be Ugur (bye bye Ugur)
- Dema Azadî (Time of freedom)
- Kela Dimdim (Dimdim Castle)
- Tîna rojê (Heat of the sun)
- Kehniya Stranan (Fountain of songs)
- Mam Zekî (Uncle Zekî)

== Filmography ==
=== Film ===
- Rêç (Trace)
- Doz (Case)
