= Kurdish rebellions during World War I =

Rebellions against the Ottoman Empire

- Part of the Middle Eastern theater of World War I
- Kurdish rebellions during World War I (West and Central Asia)
Date	August 1914 – October 1918
Location	Northern and southern Kurdistan
Territorial changes	De facto: Establishment of a quasi-independent Kurdish state until 1919; De jure: Territorial concessions given to Kurds in 1920, reversed in 1923

Belligerents
Ottoman Empire	Various Kurdish tribes Limited support: Russian Empire (1917) Kurdish state

Commanders and leaders
Ahmed Izzet Pasha; Galatalı Şevket Bey	Sheikh Mahmud; Şerif Pasha; Mustafa Pasha; Simko Shikak; Abdulkadir Ubeydullah; Amar Khan Sharifi; Alişir Efendî; Emin Ali

Casualties and losses
Unknown	Unknown
- Several villages burned, destroyed or looted Large populations of Kurds displaced

During World War I, several Kurdish rebellions took place within the Ottoman Empire. The rebellions were preceded by the emergence of early Kurdish nationalism and Kurdish revolts in Bitlis in 1907 and early 1914. The primary Kurdish war aim was the creation of an independent Kurdish state, a goal that Britain and Russia promised to fulfil in order to incite Kurdish resistance. Other reasons for resistance include a fear that they would suffer the same fate as the Armenians, the desire for more autonomy, and according to Ottoman sources, banditry.

The first Kurdish rebellion was launched in August 1914, before the Ottoman entry into World War I. From 1915 to 1916, further Kurdish rebellions took place in Botan, Dersim, and south of Kiğı. 1917 saw 2 additional waves of rebellion in summer and August, the latter of which received Russian military support. Besides direct military opposition, Kurdish civilians also partook in passive resistance by assisting advancing Russian forces, hiding or adopting Armenian refugees during the genocide, and resisting Ottoman military drafts. Shortly before the Armistice of Mudros in October 1918, Mahmud Barzanji broke away from the Ottoman Empire and established a quasi-independent Kurdish state under British supervision.

British wartime promises of an independent Kurdistan were included in the Treaty of Sèvres (1920), which assigned a small amount of territory for a planned Kurdish state, but these plans were abandoned with the Turkish nationalist victory in the Turkish War of Independence and the ensuing Treaty of Lausanne (1923), incorporating the Kurds into Turkey. Kurdish rebellions in Turkey continued after 1923.

Several villages were looted, burned or destroyed by both the Kurdish rebels and the Ottoman authorities. In reprisal to the rebellions, Ottoman authorities deported large populations of Kurds.

== Background ==
The rebellions were preceded by the emergence of early Kurdish nationalism and Kurdish revolts in Bitlis in 1907 and early 1914.

== Kurdish aims ==
The Kurds hoped that the Allies of World War I would aid them in creating an independent Kurdish nation if they were to fight against the Ottomans. Indeed, Britain and Russia promised to support Kurdish independence to encourage resistance. As the war progressed, the advance of Russian troops into the Eastern Anatolian hinterland with an idea of the "Liberation of Armenia" gradually turned (for a while) into an unspoken "Liberation of Kurdistan". Other reasons for resistance include a fear that they would suffer the same fate as the Armenians, as well as increasing autonomy.

Ottoman staff officer Barhan Ozkok, writing in 1932, attributes Kurdish resistance to a desire for independence as well as banditry.

A 2022 article by Turkish academic Erhan Taş contests claims that Kurdish resistance (specifically the 1916 Dersim revolt) was driven by nationalism or a desire for independence, as these are not backed by contemporary war documents and based on statements by authors writing in later decades.

== Timeline ==
=== Initial revolt (1914) ===
The first Kurdish rebellion during World War I took place prior to the Ottoman entry into World War I. In August 1914, the nephew of the mayor of Dersim was killed by a member of the Ferhatuşağı tribe, and in response to Ottoman reprisals the Ferhatuşağı tribe rebelled. The Ferhatuşağı were joined by the Karaballı, Lower Abbas, Abbasuşağı and Koçuşağı tribes. The murder of the chieftain of the Ferhatuşağı tribe ended the rebellion.

=== Uprising in Botan (1915–1916) ===
In spring 1915, a Kurdish revolt broke out in Botan. The revolt drove out the Ottoman troops entirely and as a result, the locals would govern the region for over a year.

=== Uprising in Dersim, Ottoman deportations (1916) ===
The Dersim uprising of 1916 was an Alevi Kurdish uprising led by Ali Ağa in the region of Dersim. Its causes laid in the Kurdish fear that they would suffer the same fate as the Armenians, as well as the desire to remove the state control in Dersim. This revolt was encouraged by Russian emissaries, who had promised to local chieftains that Dersim would be given independence after Russian occupation.

The uprising began in early March 1916. Kurdish rebels occupied and destroyed the towns of Nazimiye, Mazght, Pertek, and Charsandjak, and then marched towards the residence of the province governor (vali), Mamuretülaziz (modern day Elazığ). As the Kurds advanced, they captured many weapons from Turkish soldiers. Turkish officials in Mezere and Harput felt extremely threatened by the Kurdish revolt, since the Russians at the time occupied the area between Erzurum and Erzincan which adjoined Dersim to the north. The Ottoman army would likely to be incapable of resisting a coordinated Kurdish-Russian advance on Harput, leading the Muslim population of that settlement to make preparations to escape.

In response to the Kurdish rebellion, Ottoman authorities launched an operation to clear Dersim from Kurdish rebels on 1 April. Involved in this operation was the Ottoman 13th division, led by Galatalı Şevket Bey. This division included a contingent of troops led by Hasan Khayri Bey, as well as Shafi’i Kurds. On the day following the start of the operation, Kurdish rebels launched an unsuccessful counterattack on Pertek. Kurdish rebels were defeated at Kayacı, Mazgirt (13 April) and Şimaligarbî (16 April). By 16 April, the rebels had been reduced to an area between Nazimiye and the Ohi stream. On 18 April, after defeating 500 rebels in the area, Ottoman troops looted Kavaktepe and the surrounding villages. The next day, they burned down the village of Lemit. As Ottoman troops advanced, they clashed with Kurds at Şeyhin, Kopik (22 April), Gökerik Hill, Sinevartaşı (23 April), and Zelbaba Hill (28 April).

On 2 May, the Kurdish rebels surrendered. The operation had concluded with the defeat of the rebels, who had suffered heavy casualties. With the situation now having come under Ottoman control, the preparations of the Muslim civilians of Harput to escape had been rendered obsolete. After the defeat of the uprising, entire populations of the responsible tribes were deported from Dersim.

=== Kurds threaten the Ottoman rear (1916) ===
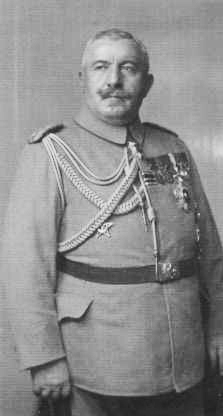
Ahmed Izzet Pasha, c. 1913

By late 1916, the Ottomans had suffered severe defeats at the hands of the Russians, having suffered a particularly severe defeat at Bingöl. This led the Kurds to once again rise up against Ottoman authorities. Ottoman convoys in Dersim were attacked and isolated units slaughtered. From September to October 1916, Kurdish rebel efforts turned the situation of the Ottoman rear south of Kiğı into one of "insecurity and disorder".

In October, the Kurdish rebellion, alongside other factors, led Ottoman general Ahmed Izzet Pasha to withdraw troops from the front, which then suppressed the rebellion.

=== Uprisings in Botan, Dersim, and Kharput (Summer 1917) ===
In summer 1917, Kurdish rebellions took place in Botan, Dersim, and Kharput.

=== Uprisings in Mardin, Diyarbekir, Bitlis, Russian involvement (August 1917) ===
In early August 1917, Kurdish rebellions took place in Mardin and Diyarbekir, followed by Bitlis. While the other Kurdish uprisings received no military support by the Allies of World War I, the uprisings of August 1917 received limited Russian support.

=== Sinjar Yezidi Uprising (January-April 1918) ===
In January 1918, the Yazidis of Sinjar initiated an uprising, which continued until April of the same year, when it was ultimately suppressed.

=== Mahmud Barzanji establishes a Kurdish state (1918) ===
With the collapse of the Ottoman Empire in October 1918, Mahmud Barzanji sought to break away from the Ottomans and create an autonomous southern Kurdistan under British supervision. He was elected as the head of government by a council of Kurdish notables in the Sulaimaniya region, and as soon as the British captured Kirkuk (25 October 1918) he captured Ottoman troops present in his district and declared the end of Ottoman rule, declaring allegiance to Britain. Other Kurdish regions followed suit, such as Rania and Keuisenjaq. This resulted in the creation of a quasi-independent Kurdish state, which lasted until it was it was dissolved by Britain in June 1919, following a rebellion.

== Passive resistance ==
=== Kurdish civilian support for Russian forces ===
On 2 August 1916, the Ottoman Second Army led by Ahmed Izzet Pasha began an offensive to recapture Malazgirt from Russia. Russia responded by rushing experienced mountain units to stem Ottoman attacks. Kurdish civilians hostile to the Ottoman Empire helped Russian forces find uncharted tracks across the mountains. The Ottoman offensive came to a halt in early September and finished on 26 September 1916.

=== Kurdish civilian opposition to the Armenian genocide ===
During the Armenian genocide, some Kurdish civilians hid or adopted Armenian refugees.

=== Kurdish resistance to Ottoman recruitment ===
Although tens of thousands of Kurds served for the Ottoman army during World War I, recruitment attempts were not always successful. In Diyarbekir and Bitlis, only a tiny portion of Kurdish tribesmen subscribed to the Hamidiye, while, for instance, in Dersim, everybody refused to join. Lack of military enthusiasm was commonly noticed among the Kurds in the Ottoman Army, with Kurdish forces frequently showing contempt for orders and avoidance of responsibility. Ottoman leadership often distrusted Kurds, and deliberately equipped them with an insufficient amount of outmoded armaments and ammunition. Kurdish desertions were common, and almost no Kurdish soldiers remained in the Ottoman Army by the end of the war.

== Casualties ==
=== Military ===
Ottoman staff officer Barhan Ozkok, writing in 1932, states that Kurdish rebels suffered 300 killed and 200 captured in a battle on 28 April 1916 during the Dersim revolt. He further mentions 100 Kurdish soldiers being killed on 1–2 May. He does not provide figures for the entire 1916 Dersim rebellion, nor does he provide figures on Ottoman losses. Yakup Kaya writes that Kurdish forces had suffered heavy casualties during the 1916 Dersim revolt.

=== Civilian ===
During the 1916 Dersim rebellion, Kurdish rebels destroyed the villages of Nazimiye, Mazght, Pertek, and Charsandjak. Ottoman forces responded to the rebellion by looting Kavaktepe and the surrounding villages. They also burned down the village of Lemit.

In response to Kurdish rebellions, Ottoman authorities carried out deportations against Kurdish civilians. Most sources suggest that as many as 700,000 Kurds were deported during World War I, although there are no reliable statistics. Safrastian (1948) estimates that half of these deported Kurds died. Uğur Ümit Üngör (2009) writes that "it would require a separate study to calculate meticulously how many were deported".

== Aftermath ==
=== Kurds gain concessions (1919-1920) ===
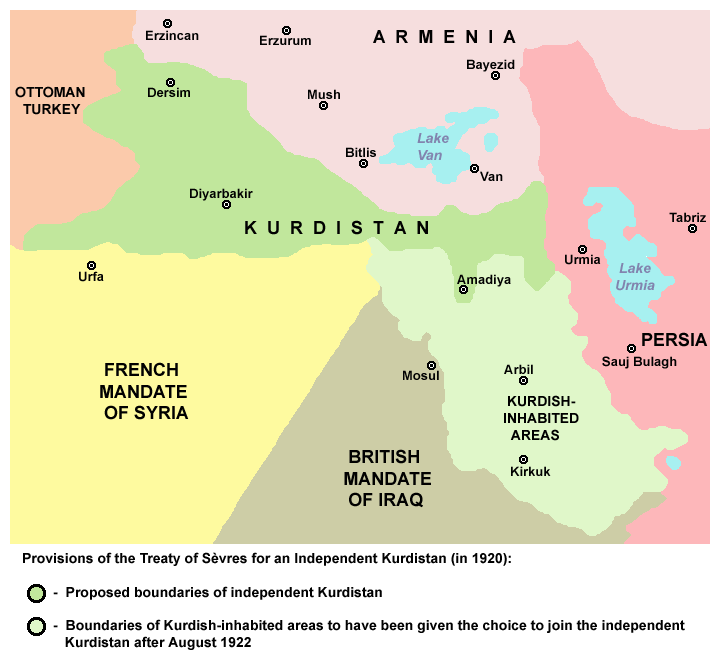
Provisions of the Treaty of Sèvres for an independent Kurdistan (in 1920).

The Kurds submitted their claim for independence to the Paris Peace Conference in 1919. According to the Treaty of Sèvres, the Kurdistan region, including Mosul Province, was scheduled to have a referendum to decide its fate.

There was no general agreement among Kurds on what the borders of Kurdistan should be because of the disparity between the areas of Kurdish settlement and the political and administrative boundaries of the region. The outlines of Kurdistan as an entity had been proposed in 1919 by Şerif Pasha, who represented the Society for the Elevation of Kurdistan (Kürdistan Teali Cemiyeti) at the Paris Peace Conference. He defined the region's boundaries as follows:

The frontiers of Turkish Kurdistan, from an ethnographical point of view, begin in the north at Ziven, on the Caucasian frontier, and continue westwards to Erzurum, Erzincan, Kemah, Arapgir, Besni and Divick (Divrik?); in the south they follow the line from Harran, Sinjar Mountains, Tel Asfar, Erbil, Süleymaniye, Akk-el-man, Sinne; in the east, Ravandiz, Başkale, Vezirkale, that is to say the frontier of Persia as far as Mount Ararat.

That caused controversy among other Kurdish nationalists, as it excluded the Van Region (possibly as a sop to Armenian claims to that region). Emin Ali Bedir Khan proposed an alternative map that included Van and an outlet to the sea via what is now Turkey's Hatay Province. Amid a joint declaration by Kurdish and Armenian delegations, Kurdish claims concerning Erzurum vilayet and Sassoun (Sason) were dropped, but arguments for sovereignty over Ağrı and Muş remained.

Neither proposal was endorsed by the treaty of Sèvres, which outlined a truncated Kurdistan on what is now Turkish territory (leaving out the Kurds of Iran, British-controlled Iraq and French-controlled Syria).

=== Koçgiri rebellion (1921) ===
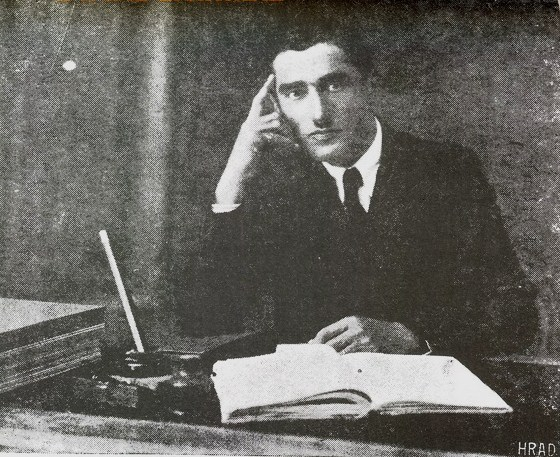
The Treaty of Sèvres was supported by Abdulkadir Ubeydullah (left) and opposed by Nuri Dersimi (right), the latter of which would participate in the Koçgiri rebellion.

The Turkish War of Independence (19 May 1919 – 24 July 1923) was fought between the Turkish National Movement and the Allied powers—namely Greece in the West, Armenia on the East, France on the South, royalists and the separatists in various cities, and the United Kingdom and Italy in Constantinople (now Istanbul)—after parts of the Ottoman Empire were occupied and partitioned following the Ottomans' defeat in World War I.

During this war, Kurdish rebels fought against the Ankara government in the Koçgiri rebellion. After the Treaty of Sèvres was signed the Kurds began to feel more trustful that they were able to reach at least some sort of an autonomous government for themselves. Abdulkadir Ubeydullah, the son of Sheikh Ubeydullah and the president of the SAK, supported the idea of a Kurdish autonomy within Turkey. But Nuri Dersimi and Mustafa Pasha wanted more than autonomy, they wanted to establish an independent Kurdistan according to article 64 of the treaty. Mustafa Kemal followed up on the events in the Dersim area and as it came to his knowledge that some of the Kurds were pursuing autonomy in line with the fourteen points announced by US president Woodrow Wilson, he answered that the plan of Wilson was worthless for the peoples in the eastern provinces and they should rather follow his Turkish nationalist movement. The rebellion began in the overwhelmingly militant Koçgiri region in eastern present-day Sivas Province in February 1921. The rebels were crushed by June 17, 1921.

=== Concessions abandoned (1923) ===
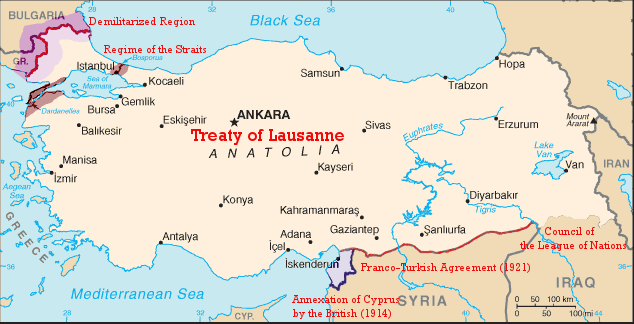
Borders of Turkey set by the Treaty of Lausanne.

After Turkish nationalist victories in the Turkish–Armenian, Franco-Turkish and Greco-Turkish fronts (often referred to as the Eastern Front, the Southern Front, and the Western Front of the Turkish War of Independence, respectively), the Treaty of Sèvres was abandoned and new treaties were signed. The Treaty of Lausanne (1923) failed to mention the Kurds.

=== After Lausanne (1923-present) ===
Kurdish rebellions in Turkey continued after the Treaty of Lausanne. In the 1920s and 1930s, there were the Beytüşşebab rebellion (1924), Sheikh Said rebellion (1925), Ararat rebellion (1927-1930), and the Dersim Rebellion (1937-1938). The most recent phase of Kurdish-Turkish conflict began in 1978 and ended in 2025.

== See also ==
- Dersim uprisings (1897–1938)
- Kurds in World War II
- Simko Shikak Revolt

== Sources ==
- Ahmad, Kamāl Muẓhar (1994). Kurdistan During the First World War. Saqi Books. ISBN 978-0-86356-084-2.
- Olson, Robert (1989). The Emergence of Kurdish Nationalism and the Sheikh Said Rebellion, 1880–1925. University of Texas Press. ISBN 978-0-292-72085-5.
- Özoğlu, Hakan (2004). Kurdish Notables and the Ottoman State: Evolving Identities, Competing Loyalties, and Shifting Boundaries. SUNY Press. ISBN 978-0-7914-5993-5.
- Schaller, Dominik J.; Zimmerer, Jürgen (March 2008), "Late Ottoman genocides: the dissolution of the Ottoman Empire and Young Turkish population and extermination policies—introduction", Journal of Genocide Research, 10 (1): 7–14, doi:10.1080/14623520801950820, S2CID 71515470
- Üngör, Ugur Ümit (2011), The making of modern Turkey : nation and state in Eastern Anatolia, 1913-1950, Oxford University Press, ISBN 9780199603602
