= Kemal Burkay =

Turkish politician, writer and poet lawyer

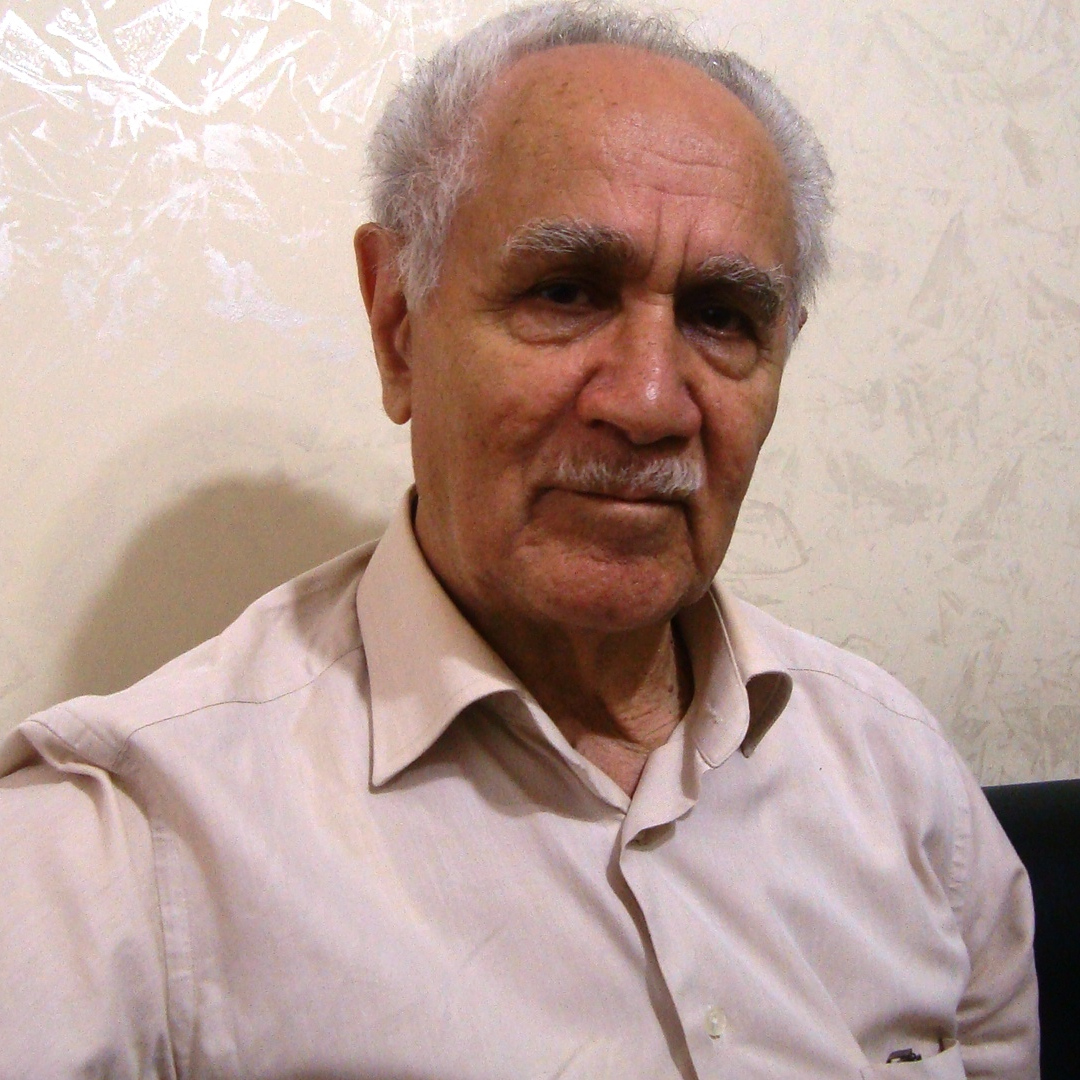

Personal details
- Born: 1937 (age 88–89) Kızılkale, Mazgirt, Tunceli, Turkey
- Citizenship: Turkish
- Party: Workers' Party of Turkey (1966-1972); Kurdistan Socialist Party (1974-?); Rights and Freedoms Party (2012-present)
- Education: Ankara University
- Occupation: Politician, Lawyer

Kemal Burkay (1937, Kızılkale, Mazgirt, Tunceli) is a Kurdish writer and politician.

== Biography ==
He attended his primary education in Tunceli and graduated from Ankara University, Law School in 1960.

== Political career ==
In 1965 he joined the Workers' Party of Turkey. Due to an article published in 1966, he was jailed. Following the coup d'état in 1971 most of the Kurds who were politically involved were detained. Burkay was imprisoned for one year, and after a new warrant for his arrest was issued, Burkay went into exile to Germany in 1972. In 1974, Burkay was involved prominently in the establishment of the Socialist Party of Kurdistan (TKPS) which published the magazine Özgürlük Yolu (Riya Azadi) between 1975 and 1979. Özgürlük Yolu was to become an influential magazine for the Kurdish politicians at the time. In 1980, just ahead of the coup d'état of the military, he left Turkey and settled in Sweden. In 1993, then the head of the Socialist Party of Kurdistan, he was interviewed for 18 days together with Abdullah Öcalan by the journalist Oral Çalışlar. The interview was then published in the newspaper Cumhuriyet and later in booklet form, which caused some controversy in Turkish politics as the publication of the booklet was banned. Burkay supported the ceasefire announced by the Kurdistan Workers' Party (PKK) on 17 March 1993. He signed an agreement for future cooperation with Öcalan on the 19 March 1993. In 2011, he returned from his exile in Sweden after the government of the Justice and Development Party (AKP) improved the situation for the Kurdish movement, and in 2012 he was elected as the president of HAK-PAR, a party which advocates for the improvement of the situation of the Kurdish population in Turkey.

== Personal life ==
He is married and father to 5 children.
