= Hevbendî =

Alliance of Turkish Kurdish parties

Kurdistan National Alliance Hevbendî
- Flag of Kurdistan, used by Hevbendi
- Headquarters: Turkey
- Ethnic groups: Kurds
- Type: Political
- Membership: Founding members: Kurdistan Democratic Party/North; Kurdistan Socialist Party (Turkey); Kurdistan Patriots Party; Vejin Movement
- 7 November 2026

The Kurdistan National Alliance (Hevbendi) is a Kurdish political alliance in Turkey, established on 7 November 2026. It consists of various Kurdish political parties, movements, civil society organizations, and independent figures.

== History ==
On 7 November 2026, several Kurdish parties in Turkey gathered at a conference Diyarbakır and established the Kurdistan National Alliance (Hevbendi). The conference elected a 51-member council consisting of representatives from several Kurdish parties and institutions. The founding parties included the Kurdistan National Initiative (PELKURD), the Kurdistan Democratic Party – North (PDK-BAKUR), the Kurdistan Socialist Party (PSK), the Kurdistan Patriots Party (PWK) and the Vejin Movement. Other, movements, civil society organizations, and independent figures also participated. 170 politicians attended the founding conference. The alliance called for; Kurdish self-determination, constitutional recognition and self-government. The coalition has been accused by Turkish nationalist politicians of advocating for separatism. They also oppose the ongoing peace process between Turkey and the Kurdistan Workers' Party.

Following the alliance's formation, Amed's public prosecutor ordered an investigation into its establishment. On the morning of 17 November, arrest warrants were issued for numerous individuals, according to Cumhuriyet, a Turkish newspaper affiliated with the opposition, Republican People's Party (CHP). The investigation is, being conducted under Article 302 of the Turkish Penal Code, which deals with the crime of "undermining the unity of the state and the territorial integrity of the country,". Twelve Kurdish politicians were detained in Diyarbakır, Iğdır, Ankara, Şanlıurfa and Mardin as part of an investigation led by the Diyarbakır Chief Public Prosecutor's Office. Among them were PSK leader Bayram Bozyel, his deputy Hasan Dağtekin, PWK deputy leader Mehmet Can Azbay and PÊLKurd leader Fuat Önen. According to their lawyer, Sabahattin Korkmaz, all those detained were members of the Kurdistan National Alliance (HEVBENDÎ). The detainees' were also restricted from meeting with their lawyers.

As of 17 September 2026, the parties that participated in Hevbendi's founding, are currently facing closure proceedings at the Constitutional Court of Turkey.
