= Skövde =

Settlement in Sweden

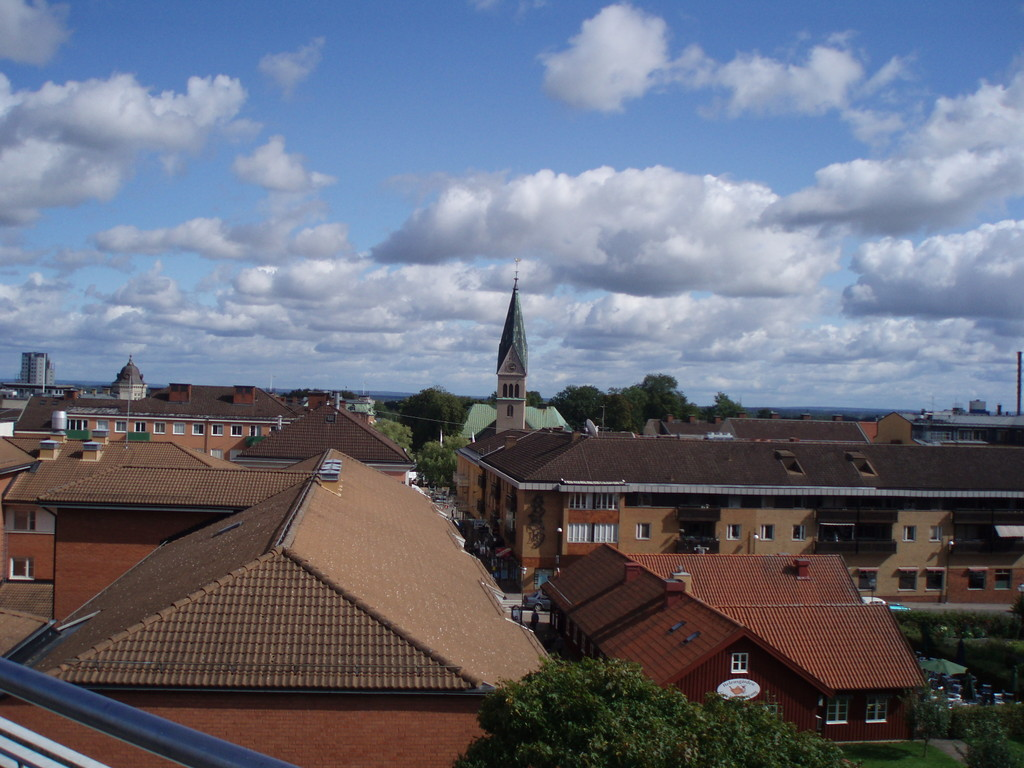
- Skövde

- Coat of arms

- Location within Sweden
- Coordinates: 58°23′N 13°51′E
- Country: Sweden
- Province: Västergötland
- County: Västra Götaland County
- Municipality: Skövde Municipality

Area
  - Total: 20.31 km^{2} (7.84 sq mi)

Population (31 December 2021)
  - Total: 57,061
  - Density: 1,697/km^{2} (4,400/sq mi)
- Time zone: UTC+1 (CET)
  - Summer (DST): UTC+2 (CEST)

Skövde (Swedish pronunciation: [ˈɧœ̂vːdɛ]) is a locality and urban centre in Skövde Municipality and Västra Götaland County, in the Västergötland (Western Gothland region) in central southern Sweden.

Skövde is situated around 150 km northeast of Gothenburg, between Sweden's two largest lakes, Vänern and Vättern. It lies on the eastern slope of a low mountain ridge, Billingen (304 m), which cuts through the plain between the lakes. The Western Main Railway (Västra Stambanan) was built through Skövde in the 1850s, which gave the town a dramatic industrial and population boost.

Today, Skövde is home to the headquarters for Skaraborg's District Court and is the Västra Götaland's fourth-largest urban area as well as Sweden's 32nd biggest locality (by population) with 39,580 inhabitants in 2020.

== History ==
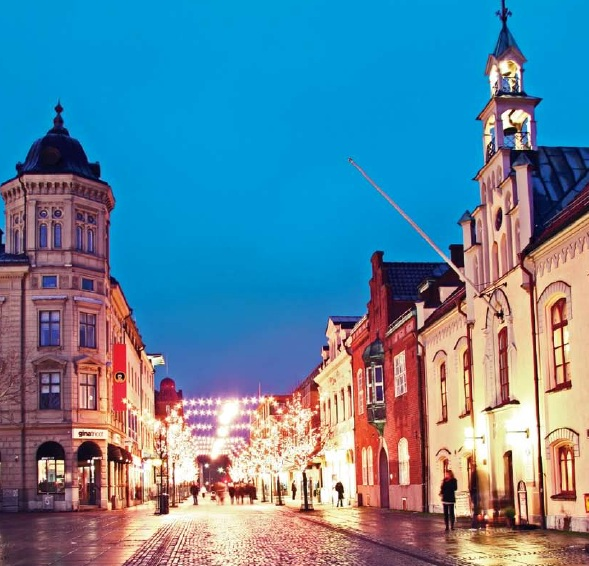
Skövde's Town centre at Hertig Johans torg

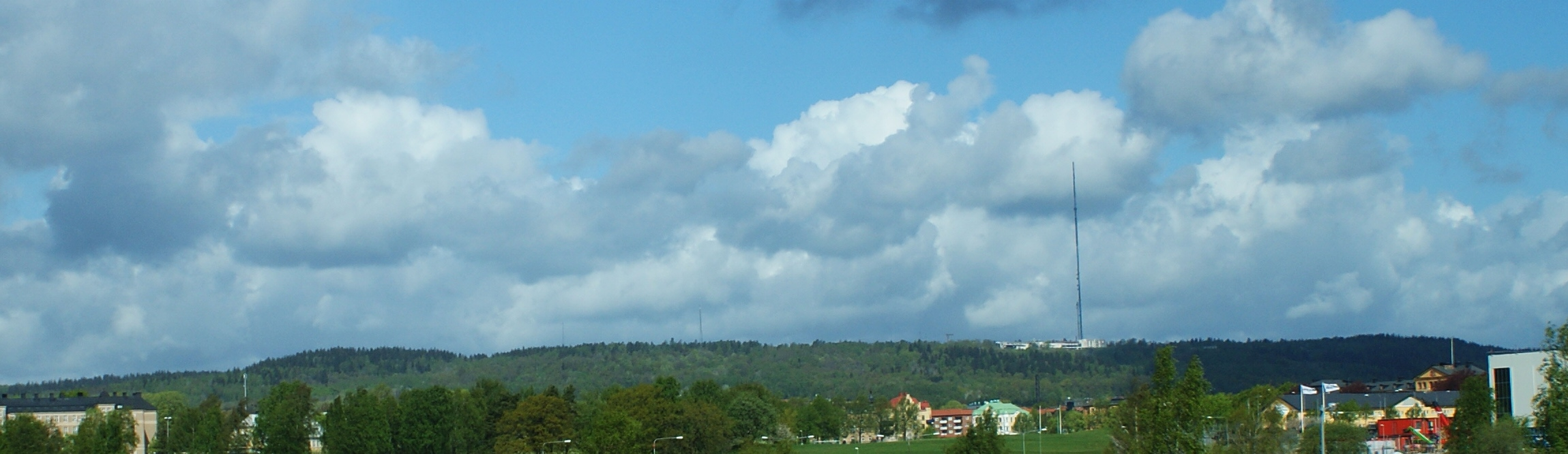
Billingen seen from the East with Skövde in the foreground.

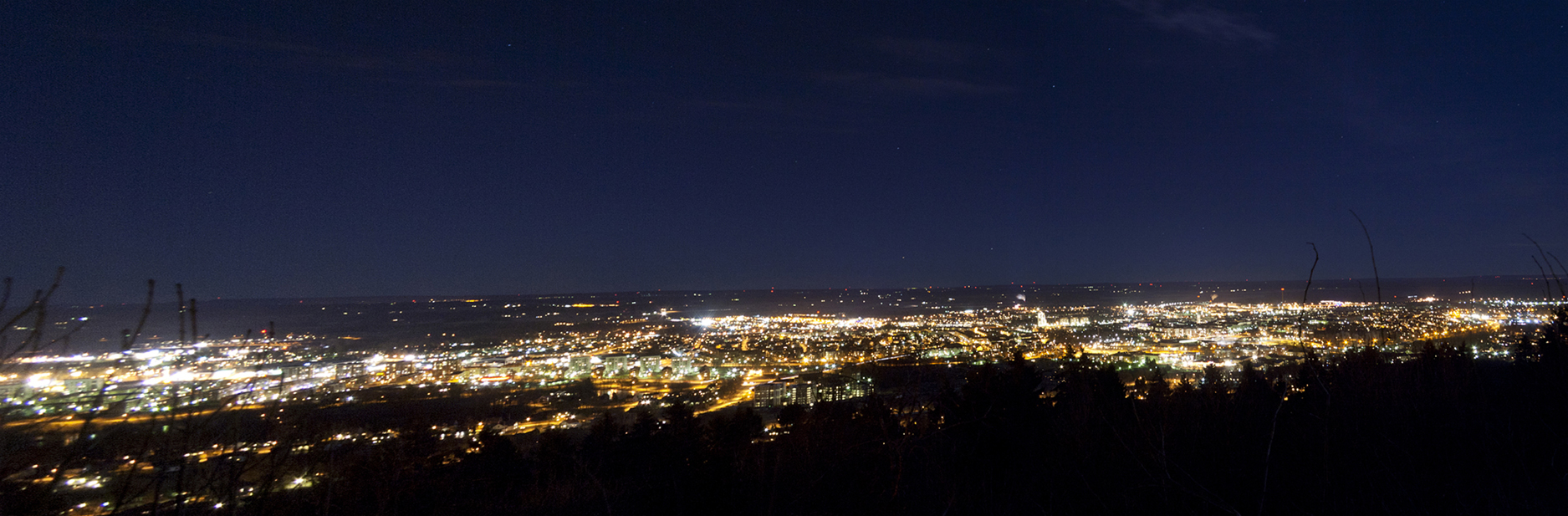
Skövde evening skyline, seen from the top of the mountain on Billingen

Skövde traces its history back to the Medieval Age. In Skövde's city coat of arms is the image of Saint Elin (also known as Saint Helena), who was considered a pious woman from Skövde. She was born about 1101, and was canonized in 1164.

Of the medieval houses that once existed virtually nothing remains, as a fire in 1759 burned down the entire city except for some houses called Helensgården. After the fire, the city was rebuilt according to a grid pattern. The city only had a small population until the railway between Stockholm and Gothenburg was laid through the city, leading to an industrial and population boost.

=== Pre-16th century ===
Skövde's patron saint, Saint Elin (also known as Saint Helena), lived in the 12th century. According to legend, she was murdered on the way to a church consecration. She was canonized on 30 July 1164 by Pope Alexander III and Archbishop Stefan of Sweden. During the Middle Ages, people made pilgrimages to Elin's grave, and this contributed to the city's development and growth.

During the Middle Ages Skövde was a successful city, the economy thriving and Skövde eventually developed into a city of significant importance. Adjacent to the city were three churches: The City Church, The Elin Chapel directly south of the city, and Holy Birgitta's Chapel in the north. The city was at this time probably not especially great in area or population, rather its greatness lay in that it was once home to the Patron Saint of the Diocese, St. Elin. The pilgrims travelled here to visit the Saint's origin and burial place, and the commerce around the pilgrims came to be an important prerequisite for Skövde's development in the ensuing century.

The exact year when Skövde got its town charter is unknown, but it can be assumed to be sometime around the year 1400 when the city was mentioned in a tax roll. At the beginning of the 16th century, King Gustav Vasa confirmed the town's charter in a letter.

=== The 16th century until the Fire of 1759 ===
If the 15th century was marked by success, then the 16th century saw an emergent decline for the city. The main reason for this was the Reformation and the transition to the Lutheran faith. They wanted to cleanse out all forms of idol worship in the form of saintly cults from the churches; these churches were emptied of treasures and relics, and Skövde itself did not escape.

Pilgrims ceased to travel here and a large part of the city's revenue disappeared practically overnight. King Gustav Vasa also had plans to move the city together with some other cities of the West Göta region to Hornborgasjön ('Lake Hornborg') in order to build a great city.

In 1520 the first documented setback took place for Skövde. The Danish King, Kristian II, undertook his third military campaign against Sweden. One of the Danish armies swept through Västergötland (Western Götland) and burned down Skövde, Falköping, Skara and Bogesund (now Ulricehamn).

It was only in the 17th century that figures of how many people lived in Skövde could be estimated with any fair degree of certainty. For the year 1655, the city presented a census of 134 people, 34 farmers, 38 housewives, 12 sons, 3 daughters, 2 farmhands, 8 maids, 10 boarders, 14 boatmen, and 13 described as '63 years old', i.e. contemporary retirees. During the 1660s there was some growth, and in 1669 the city had a population of 168 people.

At the beginning of the 18th century, Skövde was one of the county's smallest towns. In 1700, the town has just 154 inhabitants, but only 50 years later had the population risen to 381. In 1770 the population had risen up to 500 people. At the beginning of the 18th century, the Swedish towns and country districts had to take care of prisoners of war captured by Karl XII's armies. It was the Saxons, Germans, Danes, Norwegians, Poles and Cossacks who lived in enforced internship in Skövde.

In 1708, there were up to 56 prisoners of war in Skövde. In the town hall's civil rules one can read that the number of prisoners was now so great that every citizen had to now take care of a prisoner. In 1718, there were up to 90 Danish prisoners, in other words, the number of prisoners of war came to dominate the small Skövde.

In 1746, Carl von Linné was out on his journey through Västra Götaland, where he also visited tracts of Skövde. He talks in detail about the pollarded meadows in Berg, beeches on Ingasäter and Mölltorp's alum works. When on 27 June he reached Skövde, he did not have much positive to say, 'Skövde town, quarter before six from Berg, was a very small spot, located on the east side of Billingen, without any lake or particular feature, the houses were small, streets irregular and Cemetery on set with lovely boxes. This city has once been the seat of St. Helena.' His journey continued southerly, the next stop being Skultorp. Once again Linnaeus was compelled to share his experiences, describing women's hats, farmhands' courtship and the magnificent view from Skultorp's Nabbe.

The year 1759 saw the destruction of central Skövde in a large fire. A block of old wooden houses are preserved, and together with a botanical garden, form the cultural reserve Helénsparken. The oldest house in the park, Helénsstugan ('Heléns cottage') is from the early 18th century. Next to Hertig Johan's Torg ('Duke Johan's Square') is Saint Helena's Church and church park.

=== Town after the fire ===
Skövde recovered after the fire. The social life began to flourish, balls and theatrical performances followed one another. The inhabitants of the city lived a safe and hopefully pleasant small-town life. However, new winds would blow that would change the city's development for a long time.

At the start of the 1860s, the city's area was limited to what is now called the old city. Some major industries did not exist yet; handicrafts, trade and agriculture were the only industries that were practiced. Agriculture and animal husbandry were the primary industries for the inhabitants right up to the 1850s, while the actual town's urban bourgeoisie industries were developed.

The policemen in Skövde, or 'the magistrate's henchmen' as they were known in formal terms of the time, were few in number during the first part of the 19th century. The city's police force consisted of one permanent employee. The uniform cap showed his power and authority, while his armament consisted of a truncheon. His task was to carry out the punishment when someone was convicted to be flogged.

In the early 19th century, the town was dominated by one-storey houses. The roofs were usually covered with straw, reeds, peat or boards. Only in 1850 did it become common to use brick.

During the 19th century, the first half of the year had six or seven markets in Skövde. 1847 saw the introduction of market square days, which soon came to have the character of regular market days. The market came to be limited to two times a year, one in spring and one in autumn. An important market was the remounting market (remonterinsmarknaden), or horse market, that occurred annually on 19 September. It was widely known, even beyond the country's borders. Buyers came from the cavalry and artillery regiments, but also individual buyers from Norway, Denmark and Germany, to buy young horses. The trade was so great that several thousand horses could change hands in a single day.

On 2 April 1832, it was decided that the streets would be named. Previously, all the plots of land were only numbered. But it was not long before street addresses completely broke through, though even in the 1930s plot numbers were sufficient to use as post addresses.

In 1858, the population of the city increased and soon the railway stood finished. In 1859, the Västra stambanan ('Western Main Line') was inaugurated. Discussions on a newspaper began to take off. They got in touch with the editor of Göteborgs Handels- och Sjöfartstidning (Gothenburg Trade and Maritime News Journal), S.A. Hedlund, who promised to provide news content and editorials. The newspaper was called Sköfde Tidning (Skövde Newspaper) and was published every Saturday. The first issue came out on 13 November 1858. In 1960, the paper, then known as Västgöta Korrespondenten Skövde Tidning (VK – The West Göta Correspondent), joined with Skaraborgs Läns Annonsblad (SLA – Skaraborg County Advertiser, founded in 1884).

On 18 June 1870, a hydrotherapy spa opened nearby the railway station, which had the effect of Skövde experiencing a short period as a spa resort. The spa, founded by Dr. Lars G Dovertie, was busily frequented during the 1870s and 1880s. Since 1992, the spa has been a student union building.

In 1884, a company was formed to meet the need of an indoor riding arena. The city voluntarily donated a spot just north of the city. The riding school was later to become a key player in future discussions about placing regiments in Skövde. 1889 brought the issue of trying to get Life Regiment Hussars's recruit school to Skövde. It was suggested that this would see a shift from a 'tenement soldier' regiment (soldiers from Sweden's allotment system) to an enlisted troupe. In 1891, it was decided that Skövde would get the regiment in two years, but at the end of 1894 Örebro emerged as a competitor to Skövde. Örebro had certain advantages, for example a large indoor riding arena, but after new bids from Skövde, the town emerged victorious. Since 1896 the Husarernas rekrytskola ('Hussars Recruit School') has been located in Skövde.

The latter half of the 20th century was characterised by furious redevelopment. This brought parking lots and the creation of monumental buildings, some arguably more beautiful than others. Centuries-old features of the cityscape were erased, in particular all the old wooden housing settlements in the old town's western part. Otherwise the 20th century in Skövde was characterised greatly by the presence of the military. Military-dressed men have been a marked feature of Skövde's streets, even if drastically less so at the end of the 20th century and into the new millennium.

== Climate ==
Skövde has a maritime-continental hybrid climate. The town is influenced by being in the slope of a hill, which leads to warmer overnight lows than in Skara on the western side of the same higher area. In July 2018, Skövde recorded a 22 °C (72 °F) mean during the 2018 European heat wave. This makes it one of the very few stations in Sweden to have met the Köppen definition of a hot summer at any point in recorded weather history. Even so, Skövde is not frequently warm during an average year. On average, summers are cooler than on the east coast of the country. This is due to strong low pressure systems from the North Atlantic bringing plenty of rainy days along with an elevation of 150 metres (490 ft). Skövde does still have a lower precipitation total than areas to its south such as Borås and areas in Halland that are affected even more by the maritime patterns.

Climate data for Skövde (2002–2021 averages, extremes since 1915)
Month	Jan	Feb	Mar	Apr	May	Jun	Jul	Aug	Sep	Oct	Nov	Dec	Year
Record high °C (°F)	10.1 (50.2)	14.9 (58.8)	19.5 (67.1)	27.2 (81.0)	29.0 (84.2)	34.0 (93.2)	34.3 (93.7)	34.1 (93.4)	26.0 (78.8)	22.0 (71.6)	15.7 (60.3)	12.2 (54.0)	34.3 (93.7)
Mean maximum °C (°F)	7.1 (44.8)	7.9 (46.2)	13.0 (55.4)	19.5 (67.1)	24.6 (76.3)	27.1 (80.8)	28.4 (83.1)	27.3 (81.1)	22.4 (72.3)	16.1 (61.0)	11.4 (52.5)	8.1 (46.6)	30.0 (86.0)
Mean daily maximum °C (°F)	1.2 (34.2)	1.6 (34.9)	5.6 (42.1)	11.7 (53.1)	16.5 (61.7)	20.4 (68.7)	22.3 (72.1)	20.9 (69.6)	16.6 (61.9)	10.4 (50.7)	5.8 (42.4)	2.8 (37.0)	11.3 (52.4)
Daily mean °C (°F)	−1.1 (30.0)	−0.9 (30.4)	2.2 (36.0)	7.1 (44.8)	11.9 (53.4)	15.8 (60.4)	18.0 (64.4)	16.9 (62.4)	13.1 (55.6)	7.7 (45.9)	3.8 (38.8)	0.8 (33.4)	7.9 (46.3)
Mean daily minimum °C (°F)	−3.3 (26.1)	−3.3 (26.1)	−1.3 (29.7)	2.5 (36.5)	7.3 (45.1)	11.2 (52.2)	13.7 (56.7)	12.8 (55.0)	9.5 (49.1)	4.9 (40.8)	1.7 (35.1)	−1.3 (29.7)	4.5 (40.2)
Mean minimum °C (°F)	−12.9 (8.8)	−12.1 (10.2)	−8.7 (16.3)	−2.8 (27.0)	1.1 (34.0)	6.5 (43.7)	9.4 (48.9)	7.8 (46.0)	3.5 (38.3)	−1.9 (28.6)	−5.9 (21.4)	−9.7 (14.5)	−15.7 (3.7)
Record low °C (°F)	−28.9 (−20.0)	−26.4 (−15.5)	−22.0 (−7.6)	−13.4 (7.9)	−5.0 (23.0)	0.0 (32.0)	4.0 (39.2)	0.5 (32.9)	−3.7 (25.3)	−9.0 (15.8)	−16.8 (1.8)	−26.0 (−14.8)	−28.9 (−20.0)
Average precipitation mm (inches)	48.9 (1.93)	40.6 (1.60)	37.3 (1.47)	35.0 (1.38)	64.2 (2.53)	82.7 (3.26)	88.1 (3.47)	87.9 (3.46)	59.3 (2.33)	68.3 (2.69)	62.0 (2.44)	55.4 (2.18)	729.7 (28.74)
Source 1: SMHI Open Data for Skövde, precipitation
Source 2: SMHI Open Data for Skövde, temperature

== Economy ==
=== Volvo and Aurobay ===
Aurobay (formerly part of Volvo Cars) and Volvo Group Truck Operations (a company within the Volvo Group) jointly operate one of the world's largest automotive foundries in Skövde, and are Skövde's two largest employers. The Volvo Group Truck Operations plant is AB Volvo's largest producer of industrial diesel engines worldwide (producing engine blocks, cylinder heads and flywheels as well as engine mounts and disk brakes). Aurobay produces sustainable, efficient, hybrid engines for Volvo Cars and will eventually do so other customers. Aurobay has capacity for 600,000 powertrain solutions a year. In 2021, the Swedish Environmental Protection Agency approved a grant of SEK 144 million for the conversion of part of the Skövde plant to produce powertrains for electric vehicles. In 2011, the two plants combined had over 4,000 permanent employees (2,100 employees at Volvo Group Truck Operations).

=== Diversified industries ===
Skövde is a diversified industrial centre, and includes companies such as CEJN AB (pneumatic, hydraulic and high pressure hydraulic quick connect couplings), Furhoffs Rostfria ('Furhoff's Stainless Steel' – sinks and drainage), Cementa (cement) and Grahns Konfektyr ('Grahn's Confectionery' – sweets).

Skövde has many public service employers and the largest of them in Skövde Municipality. Other public service employers include the Swedish Armed Forces, Skaraborg Hospital, Kärnsjukhuset (also known as KSS – The Central Hospital), The university, Skaraborgs District Court (Skaraborgs Tingsrätt), Swedish Police and Västtrafik.

Few places can match Skövde's development in recent years as a commercial centre. Retail sales in the city have increased by 40% over the past 10 years. This contributes to the relatively large trade sector bringing many jobs in small and medium enterprises.

Skövde is a centre for game development and games for training. In the business park Gothia Science Park, there are dozens of game companies that have both developed and produced games in Skövde, such as Coffee Stain Studios and Stunlock Studios. The proximity to the relatively large gaming development program at the University of Skövde is a major contributing factor to Skövde having become a game development centre.

The many varied employment opportunities in Skövde have meant an increase in daily commuting to the city from neighboring municipalities.

=== Commerce, retail and trade ===
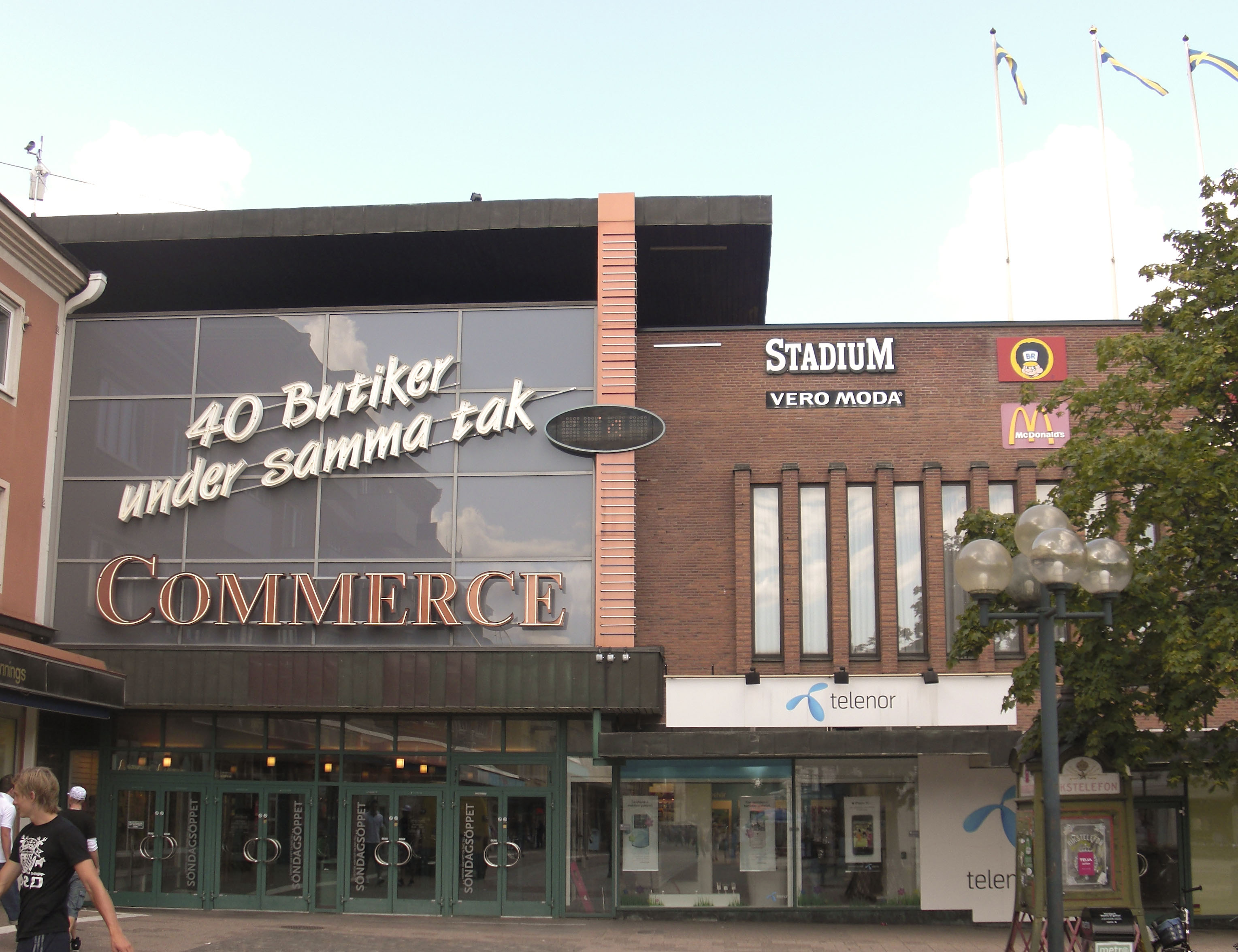
Entrance to Commerce shopping centre on Hertig Johans torg

Skövde is a shopping town with a large selection. The city centre is Skaraborg's largest shopping centre with over 40 shops and restaurants. It is located directly adjacent to Hertig Johans Torg and Sandtorget ('Sand Square') and has its own car park. In the centre are several major brands and a variety of smaller shops. In October 2008, the newly renovated shopping mall Vasaporten was finished (formerly Göfab Huset) with a dozen shops and 500 parking spaces in the adjoining car park.

Norrmalm's commerce precinct contains about twenty shops along Gustavus Adolphusgatan. Here lies a big, new shopping centre, Elins Esplanad (formerly Maxi-house), with 30 shops, a supermarket, and a restaurant and cafe. There are thousands of free parking spaces including 200 in the garage.

Stallsikens commerce precinct is an entirely new bulk retail area built for big new stores to open in Skövde. The inauguration took place in stages, starting in the spring of 2008.

Skövde has three trading areas: The centre, Norrmalm and Stallsiken, which are all within easy reach of the city. In addition, there are more specific traders in several other areas of Skövde: Aspelund, Hasslum, Mariesjö, Hallenbergrondellen ('Hallenberg'ss roundabout'), Karstorpsrondellen ('Karstorp's roundabout') and Billingesluttningen ('The Billinge Hillside').

== Culture and entertainment ==
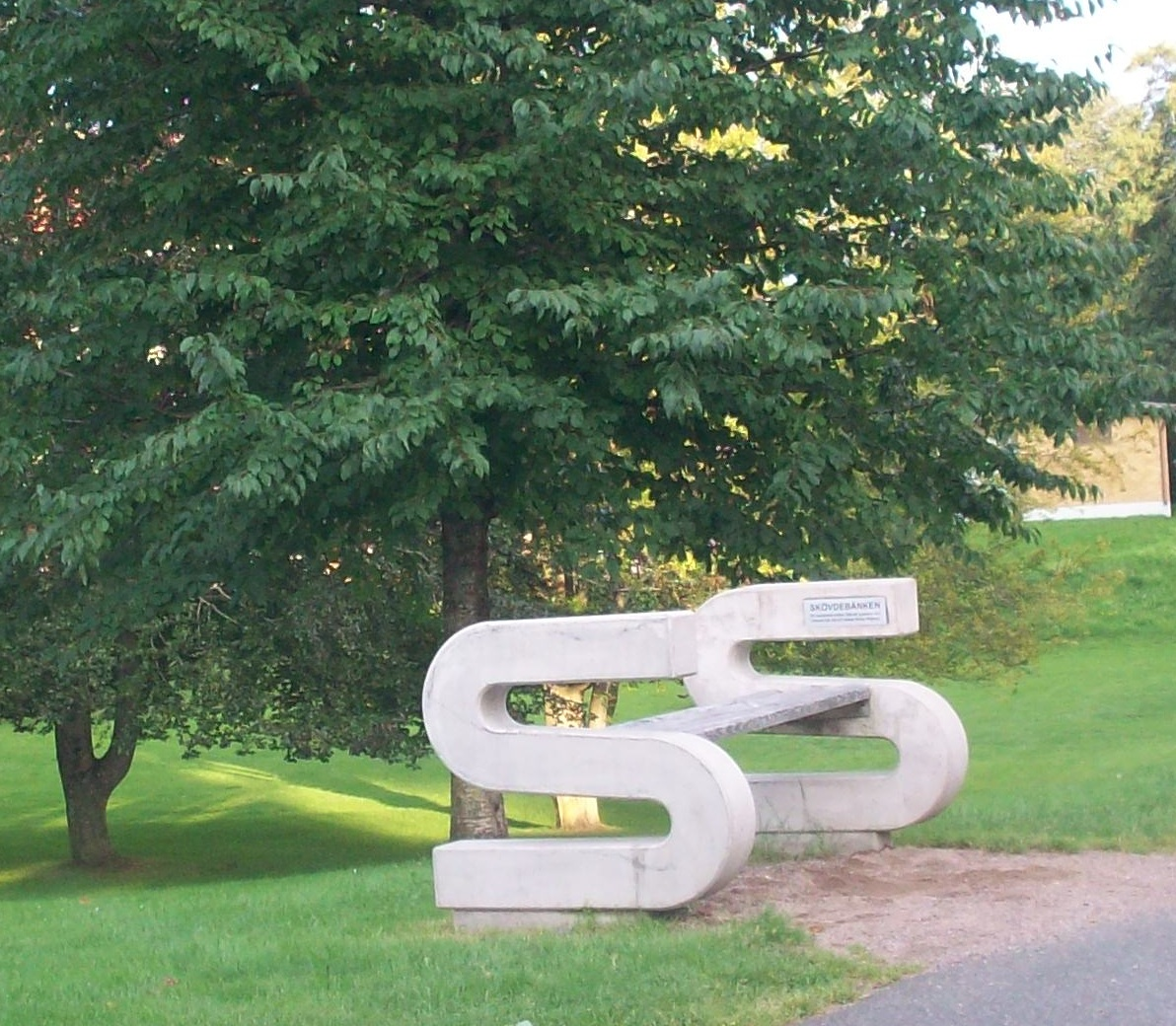
One of the city's 'Skövde benches' that are situated all around Skövde

Skövde Kulturhus ('Skovde's Civic Cultural Centre') was built in 1964 and is Sweden's first cultural centre to bring together diverse cultural disciplines under the one roof. The cultural centre was designed by architect Hans-Erland Heineman, and houses the art gallery, art museum, library, theatre and cinema.

=== Museums ===
Skövde's City Museum was previously situated in Gamla Rådhuset ('The Old Town Hall') at Hertig Johan's Torg. After 2005 the museum was moved to Norrmalm. In the museum, there are letters, legal documents, maps, theatre posters and newspaper clippings. In the archive, there are even tens of thousands of photographs from Skövde and numerous portrait photos from the 19th century. In storage, there are nearly 40,000 objects, though nobody really knows how many as not all are yet catalogued.

There is also an external exhibition in the city centre: Helénsgården ('Helén's farm' or also Helénsstugan – 'Heléns cottage' or Petter Heléns stuga – 'Petter Heléns cottage'). It is the only remaining building from the great fire affecting the city in 1759, which essentially destroyed the whole town. Helénsgården was probably built in the beginning of the 18th century and is today protected as a cultural preservation. Its park is used widely as a meeting place and for events such as Sweden's National Day celebration.

At the Skövde garrison there is the Garnisonsmuseet ('Garrison Museum'), which has military and soldier exhibits from throughout the ages. Additionally, the central soldier register proves an invaluable tool for genealogy. Skövde Sport History Museum, the newest museum in Skovde, from 2001, is located in the basement of Billingehus. Here you will find the city's sports history in sounds, images, old trophies and sports equipment.

The Volvo Museum tells of the start of Sköfde Gjuteri och Mekaniska Verkstad ('Skövde Foundry and Mechanical Workshop') in 1868 and its transformation to today's automotive industry. Ryttmästarbostället ('The Stablemaster's Residence') is located at Simsjön outside Skövde and is operated by a non-profit organisation. Its purpose is to preserve the buildings, furniture and appliances from the allotment system time and make the collections accessible to the public.

=== Music ===
Musical events are often organised in the city, such as Loke, a local initiative organising amateur nights when amateurs can play and even borrow instruments. Valhall is a local initiative right beside Loke in the Kulturhus (Skövdes Civic Culture Centre), which sees established bands play, such as Mustasch and Hardcore Superstar.

In wintertime, Arena Skövde is usually used for major artists that attract large audiences. In summer, Karstorp recreation area or Boulognerskogen ('Boulogner Forrest') are often used.

=== Theatre ===
Theatre productions can be seen at the City Theatre, located in the Kulturhus (Skövdes Civic Culture Centre). There you can see everything from revues to children's theatre. Eric Ugglas Theatre is another, in Eric Ugglas plats ('Eric Uggla's Place'), slightly south of Skövde's city centre.

=== The Food Festival ===
The Food Festival is a festival of Skövde which started in 1990 and is always the last weekend in August. The festival's focus is on food that is served in small portions from different restaurants in the city. The restaurants also compete to see who makes the best cuisine as decided by the festival's visitors. The Food Festival also has an amusement park that is located on Sandtorget and a market hall that is located on Hertig Johans Torg.

== Military ==
The armoured corps regiment Skaraborg Regiment (P 4) and the logistics corps regiment Göta Logistic Regiment (T 2) are both located in Skövde, as is the Army Combat school.

=== History ===
Around the year 1900, several Swedish Army units became stationed in Skövde. In 1913 the Skaraborg Regiment also moved there, costing the city a lot of money but also contributing to increased consumption and business. Today the garrison is one of the largest in Sweden.

=== Active military units ===
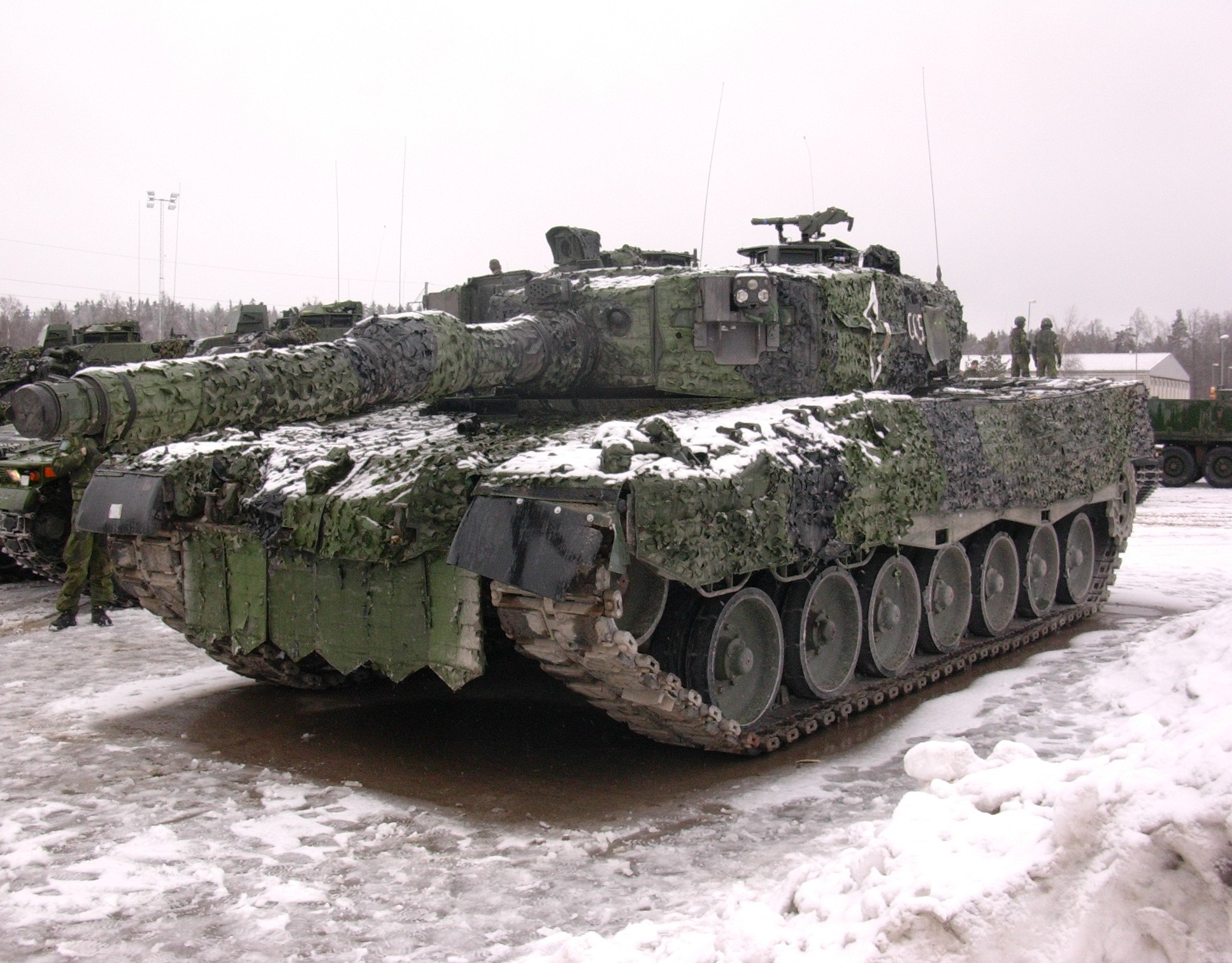
A Leopard 2 tank of Skaraborg Regiment (P 4)

There are several military units in Skövde, Skaraborg Regiment (P 4) and the Göta Logistic Regiment (T 2) with the Swedish Armed Forces Logistics and Motor School (Försvarsmaktens logistik och motorskola, LogS) and the Land Warfare Centre (MSS). P 4 trains primarily mechanized shooting units and tank units while TrängR trains logistics units of various types. The Land Warfare Centre is for the training of officers in land combat as well as development methods and evaluation practice. The Logistics School is a joint armed school that develops the skills of students and staff from the Army, Navy and Air Force within disciplines of military science, military technology, leadership and individual combat fighting. The Logistics School is located at the Göta Logistic Regiment in Skövde and works together with the Armed Forces Logistics Regiment Centre of Excellence in Logistics. After the recent decision by Defence, Skövde's garrison's role in the Armed Forces has increased, with smaller units being moved to Skövde, including the Armed Forces Engine School and Logistics School.

New duties for the troops in the city include erecting and manning positions for the Nordic Battle Group, a task force within the European Union's battlegroup concept. In essence, Skövde garrison has commitments of approximately 230 soldiers and officers in a logistics battalion, nearly one hundred in an infantry battalion staff and also a couple of independent platoons. Additionally, further troops are assigned to the separate mechanized operation company IA07.

== Education ==
=== University of Skövde ===
The University of Skövde is a university with over 9,000 students that conducts research and has a number of courses focusing across several areas. Currently, the main areas of focus are information technology and systems biology, but a few more courses are under development. The university trains, amongst others, biologists, computer scientists, economists, engineers, cognitive scientists, nurses, linguists and teachers. The University of Skövde profiles itself as having strengths across interdisciplinary courses where technology, natural science and the humanities are united. At the university, there is an ongoing project within the teaching faculty in collaboration with KK-stiftelsen called KompLIT (Competence Development Teacher Education and IT).

=== Other education providers ===
On the outskirts of the city is also Skövde Garrison, which is one of Sweden's largest, with two regiments, Skaraborg Regiment (P 4), Göta Logistic Regiment (T 2), with the Logistics School (Logistikskolan) and the Land Warfare Centre (MSS).

The Rescue and Survival College (Swedish: Räddningskolan) is a competency-enhancing education and training provider, providing education and certification in rescue, fire safety and international humanitarian work areas. It also provides hotel accommodation and conference facilities for hire.

The Swedish Rescue Training Centre (SRTC, formerly known by its Swedish moniker, Räddningverkets övningsfält) is located in Hasslum, also providing education and training in risk and safety areas.

There are two municipal highschools in Skövde, Västerhöjdsgymnasiet and Kavelbrogymnasiet, which now operates under the name of Gymnasium Skövde. There is also a municipal adult education school (vuxenutbildning or Komvux).

== Sports ==
Skövde's sports scene has long been focused around handball, however the town boasts other sports played at the elite level, albeit with relatively lower profiles. Such sports include baseball, softball and taekwondo.

=== Handball ===
Skövde's handball team play at the highest level for both males and females. IFK Skövde has more recently competed in handball's elite series (Elitserie) and 2005 saw the men compete in the final against IK Sävehof. This was a final that, despite great success during the season, IFK Skövde lost by the narrowest of margins. In 2007 the team was once again in the final, this time against Hammarby IF, who went on to win the match. Skövde HF's (Handbollsflickor – handball girls) women's team is also in Sweden's highest division. Amongst other achievements, the team played five finals over the course of several years and became Swedish champions in 2008 after they beat IK Sävehof 31−24.

=== Orienteering ===
The 1989 World Orienteering Championships were held in Skövde.

The 2002 edition of O-Ringen was also held in Skövde.

=== Clubs and associations ===
- IFK Skövde HK – handball club
- Skövde HF – Handball club
- HP Skövde 90 – Handball club
- Skövde HC – Ice hockey club
- Skövde AIK − football (soccer) club
- Skövde KIK − Football (soccer) club
- IFK Skövde Fotboll Klubb − football (soccer) club
- Våmbs IF − Football (soccer) club
- FC Södra Ryd − Football (soccer) club
- Skövde IBF – Innebandy (floor hockey) association
- Föreningen SkövdeBor, Stockholm-based expatriate association
- Skövde Saints BSK − Baseball and Softball club
- IFK Skövde Friidrott Athletics association
- IF Hagen Friidrott – Athletics association
- IF Hagen Orientering – Orienteering association
- Orienteringsklubben P 4 − Orienteering association
- Skövde Dukes – American football (gridiron) club
- IF Hagen SK − Ski club
- IFK Skövde Skidklubb – Ski club
- IF Skövde Karate Kai – Karate and Martial Arts
- Skövde ABK - Athlete- and Wrestling Club
- Skövde Bandy - Bandy association
- Skövde BC – Boxing club
- Skövde Bågskytteklubb − Archery club
- Skövde CK – Cycling club
- Skövde GF – Gymnastics association
- Skövde GK – Golf club
- Skövde Judo – Judo club
- Skövde KK – (Konståkningsklubb) – Figure Skating club
- Skövde FK − Table Tennis club
- Skövde RF – Equestrian association
- Skövde SS – Swimming association
- Skövde Taekwon-do Club − Taekwondo club
- Skövde Tennisförening − Tennis association
- Skövde VBK – Volleyball association
- S:t Helena Basket – Basketball club
- Candanza DF – Dance association

== Airport ==
Skövde Airport is located approximately 10 km from Skövde. Currently there are no scheduled flights, however there is an active flying club, gliding club and at least one corporate jet is based at Skövde. The nearest passenger airport is Göteborg Landvetter Airport, located 148 kilometres (92 mi) south west of Skövde.

== Other ==
The North's largest gold treasure, Timboholmsskatten ('Timboholm's Treasure'), was found in Skövde in 1904 by two farmhands by the names of Carl Wernlund and Per Rythén, better known as Sjôle-Lotta and Bly-Per. The treasure, which contains 24 carat gold, weighs over 7 kilograms and consists of 16 rings and two ingots. Today, the treasure is in the Swedish Museum of National Antiquities (Historiska museet) in Stockholm and a copy can be found in Skövde City Museum (Skövde stadsmuseum). The treasure dates back to the later Migration Period (around the fifth to the sixth centuries.)

== Notable residents ==
- Stig Bergström, a Swedish-American paleontologist, born in 1935 in Skövde
- Christian Älvestam, vocalist
- Fredrik Belfrage, television personality
- Helena Bergman, orienteering World Champion
- Mustafa Can, journalist
- Gustav Ejstes, musician (Dungen, Amason)
- Alfred Grenander, architect
- Thomas G:son, musician
- Robert Gustafsson, comedian
- Marcus Hellner, cross-country skier
- David Johansson, football
- Michael Jonzon, golfer
- Andreas Larsson, handball player
- Kristina Lugn, poet
- Christian Magdu, actor
- Johan Mårtensson, footballer
- Johan Sjöstrand, handball player
- Tim Sköld, musician
- Petter Stymne, swimmer
- Oscar Wendt, footballer
- Gert Wingårdh, architect
