= Beylermezraası, Mazgirt =

Village in Tunceli Province, Turkey

Beylermezraası
- Village
- Location in Turkey
- Coordinates: 38.961°N 39.575°E
- Country: Turkey
- Province: Tunceli
- District: Mazgirt
- Population (2021): 42
- Time zone: UTC+3 (TRT)

Beylermezraası (Kurdish: Beyleran) is a village in the Mazgirt District, Tunceli Province, Turkey. The village is populated by Kurds of the Alan and Bamasur tribes and had a population of 42 in 2021.
