= Mustafa Can =

Kurdish-Swedish author and journalist

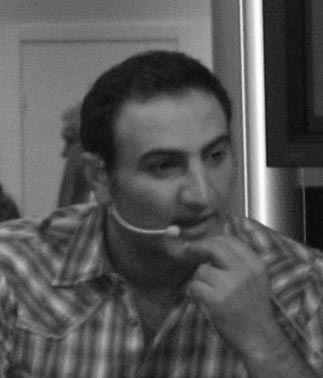
- Born: October 15, 1969 (age 56); Obuzbaşı, Turkey

Mustafa Can (born October 15, 1969 in Obuzbaşı, Turkey) is a Kurdish-Swedish author and journalist. His first novel Tätt intill dagarna was published in 2006.
