= Ataçınarı, Mazgirt =

Village in Tunceli Province, Turkey

Ataçınarı
- Village
- Location within Turkey
- Coordinates: 39.059°N 39.804°E
- Country: Turkey
- Province: Tunceli
- District: Mazgirt
- Population (2021): 72
- Time zone: UTC+3 (TRT)

Ataçınarı (Kurdish: Weliyan, Seyweliyan) is a village in the Mazgirt District, Tunceli Province, Turkey. The village is populated by Kurds of the Alan, Hormek and Şêx Mehmedan tribes and had a population of 72 in 2021.

The hamlets of Dal, Dereyeziyaret, Evciler, Kamışlı, Kepir, Sevgili, Yaylacık and Yüceler are attached to the village.
