= Bağın =

Coordinates: 39.003°N 39.899°E

Bağın, also spelt Baghin and Paghin, and called Dedebağ in Turkish, is a hamlet to Akdüven and historical town in what is now Mazgirt District, Turkey. Its remains are located by the bank of the Peri Su river, downstream from Kiğı and northwest of Karakoçan, in a flat area surrounded by hills. Between Bağın and Kiğı, there are only "isolated clusters of houses" down in the valley, while the main villages are above. The present-day hamlet consists of a handful of houses and is tucked between the riverbank and a large rocky outcropping that juts up from the surrounding flat land. This outcropping is the site of an ancient and medieval fortress, while the surrounding flat land is under cultivation.

A short distance upstream from Bağın are hot springs, where people come to bathe hoping to cure themselves of rheumatism. A bathing establishment with several cabins for visitors exists here just to the west of the springs. Nearby, on the west bank of the Peri Su, the land forms a shelf overhanging the river. Salt deposits formed by water dripping off the cliff face have created icicle-like formations on the overhanging part.

The modern hamlet is populated by Kurds of the Hormek and Izol tribes.

== History ==
=== Iron Age ===
==== Urartian period ====
The Urartians used Bağın's citadel as a fortress, and there was probably a town here as well. A block reused for medieval wall contains half of a Urartian inscription, the other half of which is now in the Elazig Museum. The inscription refers to someone named Titia being appointed governor - possibly of Bağın. There was likely a town here at this point, and its dependent district likely "primarily the Karakoçan plain, secondarily its own little square of cultivable land, and thirdly any villages there may have been in the hills surrounding the town". The population was likely culturally Urartian instead of just Urartian-ruled; there may have also been an Aramaic-speaking minority.

Ancient Bağın was the largest of several small fortresses on the road connecting the Urartian heartland around Lake Van with the upper basin of the Murat Su. It likely functioned as a "road station and barracks for the troops patrolling the road".

==== Armenian period ====
In classical Armenia, Bağın served as the capital of the canton of Paghnatun. Paghnatun probably had the same geographical scope as the unnamed Urartian district based at Bağın. No separate prince of Paghnatun is known, and it was probably politically dependent on the neighboring canton of Balahovit, based at Palu.

=== Middle Ages ===
In the Middle Ages, Bağın was a flourishing market town with a mixed Armenian and Syriac population. Its prosperity was helped by its distance from major conflict zones, allowing agriculture and animal husbandry to carry on unimpeded. The local hot springs may have drawn visitors during this period, just like today. After the 11th century, Bağın declined in importance, and by Artukid times it was little more than a village, although the fortress remained in use.

19th-century Bağın was a much larger village than it is now. A çeşme, or fountain, was constructed sometime in the 1800s to serve the village, and there are remains of a large house probably dating from the 1800s or early 1900s.
