= Oral Çalışlar =

Turkish journalist and writer

- Born: 14 December 1946 (age 79); Tarsus, Mersin, Turkey
- Education: Tarsus American College, Faculty of Political Sciences at Ankara University
- Occupations: Journalist, writer
- Years active: 1968-present
- Spouse: İpek Çalışlar

Oral Çalışlar (born 14 December 1946 in Tarsus, Mersin) is a Turkish journalist and writer.

== Life and education ==
Oral Çalışlar was born on December 14, 1946, in Tarsus, Mersin Province, Turkey. His full name is Danyal Oral Çalışlar. He completed his secondary education at Tarsus American College and Tarsus High School. After studying civil engineering for one year at the Middle East Technical University, he transferred in 1966 to the Istanbul Academy of Economic and Commercial Sciences. In 1968 he enrolled at the Faculty of Political Sciences at Ankara University, from which he later graduated. During his student years, he was among the leading figures of the 1968 student movement in Turkey and became president of the Club of Socialist Thought as well as secretary-general of the Ankara University Student Union.

Çalışlar has said his father's side of the family is Kurdish. He didn't grow up around Kurds himself, but his paternal grandfather, known as "Kürt Hüseyin" ("Kurdish Hüseyin"), fled his village in Kırşehir Province after an elopement went wrong and settled near Tarsus, in Dedeler village, where locals called the family "Kürdün çocukları," or "the Kurd's children." He died in 1915 while fighting in World War I.

He married author and journalist İpek Çalışlar in 1976. He is the father of author Reşat Çalışlar.

== Career ==
He has worked as a columnist for the newspapers Cumhuriyet (1992–2008), Radikal (2008–2013) and briefly served as an editor-in-chief of Taraf. In the 1960s he participated in the student movement and contributed to Aydınlık. He was imprisoned for three years after the 1971 Turkish coup d'état. He became editor of the newly re-established Aydınlık in 1978 and was imprisoned again after the 1980 Turkish coup d'état. As a beneficiary of an amnesty, he was eventually released in 1988. From 1990 to 1992 he settled in Hamburg, following an invitation by the city's senate. In 1993, over the course of eighteen days, he interviewed two figures in Kurdish left-wing politics: Abdullah Öcalan, founder of the PKK, and Kemal Burkay, chairman of the Socialist Party of Kurdistan. Publication of the interviews in a 1993 book about the Kurdish question led to his conviction for two years for separatist propaganda, a verdict he appealed. After several trials concerning the book, he was sentenced to 13 months' imprisonment on grounds that he disseminated separatist propaganda. He also appealed this verdict. Both TUSIAD and CPJ issued statements opposing Çalışlar's sentencing. He later became an advocate for freedom of expression. Oral Çalışlar is currently an active columnist for the Posta daily newspaper in Turkey.

== Books ==
Oral Çalışlar is the author of around 20 books.

- Liderler Hapishanesi - Ecevit, Erbakan ve Türkeş ile Cezaevi Günleri(1986)
- 12 Mart'tan 12 Eylül'e Mamak (1988)
- Hapishanede Büyümek' (1988)
- 68' Başkaldırının Yedi Rengi (1988)
- 68 Anılarım (1989)
- Hz. Ali - Muaviye Kavgası (1992),
- Refah Partisi Nereden Nereye (1993)
- Öcalan ve Burkay’la Kürt Sorunu Üzerine (1993)
- Deniz Gezmiş'ten Yaşar Kemal'e Portreler (1995)
- İslamiyet Üzerine Söyleşiler (1995)
- Kadınların İsveç’i (1996)
- Umut Peşinde (1997)
- Sol Geleceğini Arıyor (1999)
- İslamda Kadın ve Cinsellik (1999)
- Kadınlara Dair (2002)
- Denizler İdama Giderken (2002)
- Necmettin Erbakan Fethullah Gülen Kavgası, İran: Bir Erkek Diktatörlüğü (2004)
