= Incorporation of Kurdish territories into the Republic of Turkey =

Turkish takeover of Kurdistan

The incorporation of Kurdish territories into the Republic of Turkey was the takeover of Turkish Kurdistan by the Republic of Turkey during the Turkish War of Independence. Turkish nationalists considered it a liberation, while Kurdish nationalists considered it an occupation.

== Background ==
The Ottoman Empire captured Kurdistan after the Battle of Chaldiran. The Kurds joined Selim I, and were rewarded with autonomy, which began the rise of the Kurdish emirates. At its peak, the Ottoman Empire controlled all of Iraqi Kurdistan, Syrian Kurdistan, Turkish Kurdistan, and a small part of Iranian Kurdistan. In a geography textbook of Ahmet Cevad in a military school, Ottoman Kurdistan included the cities of Erzurum, Van, Urfa, Sulaymaniyah, Kirkuk, Mosul and Diyarbakir among others, and was one of the six Asian regions of the Ottoman Empire.

Kurdish nationalism emerged during the late Ottoman Empire, and there were some Kurdish nationalist revolts from 1914 to 1918. However, they were small and ineffective, and the vast majority of Kurds were loyal to the Ottomans. By the end of World War I, the Young Turks had forcibly deported around 700,000 Kurds, half of whom had perished.

== History ==
After the partition of the Ottoman Empire, the Treaty of Sèvres was signed, in which the northern parts of Turkish Kurdistan were given to Armenia, while the southern parts were intended to be a Kurdish state. Iraqi Kurdistan was incorporated into British Iraq, while Syrian Kurdistan was incorporated into French Syria. Kurdistan was scheduled to have its own status referendum, although there was no general agreement on its borders. Kurdish nationalists were in dispute with Armenian nationalists, as Turkish Kurdistan often overlapped with Western Armenia. Eventually, the Kurds dropped their claims over the Erzurum vilayet and Sason, but maintained the claims over Muş and Ağrı.

Kurdish nationalists wanted autonomy in line with the fourteen points proposed by Woodrow Wilson during the Treaty of Sèvres, although Mustafa Kemal claimed that the plan was worthless for the Kurds, and recommended that they follow the Turkish National Movement. In November 1920, Kurdish nationalists issued demands for autonomy within Turkey, and accused Turkey of violating the treaty. The reluctance of the Kemalists led to the Koçgiri rebellion in March 1921, which was quelled by June.

On September 24, 1920, the Turkish–Armenian War broke out, and on December 2, 1920, the war ended, with Armenia ceding over 50% of its territory to Turkey. The borders of Turkey with Armenia and Georgia were officially settled during the Treaty of Kars in 1921. Turkey had captured many Kurdish regions during the war. On October 20, 1921, the Treaty of Ankara was signed, ending the Franco-Turkish War. Turkey captured much territory and established the borders of Turkey and French Syria, although Hatay was disputed. The territory ceded to Turkey by France included large Kurdish regions.

In the 1920 Provisional Constitution, Article 8 asserted that Turkey was composed of both Turks and Kurds who were to be treated equally as common citizens. The borders of Turkey, with the exception of Hatay, were settled during the 1923 Treaty of Lausanne, which had completely excluded the Kurds and their demands.

== Aftermath ==
After the Republic of Turkey was founded in 1923, the state denied the existence of Kurds and the Kurdish language. The rise of Turkish nationalism sparked a rise of Kurdish nationalism. In August 1924, the Beytüşşebab rebellion began, which was provoked by both the abolition of the caliphate and the repressive Turkish policies towards Kurdish identity, the prohibition of the Kurdish language, and the Turkification campaigns. The revolt was suppressed. In February 1925, Sheikh Said, provoked by both the secularism and exclusively Turkish character of the republic, led a revolt aimed at establishing a Kurdish state under Islamic law. The revolt was suppressed in March, and Sheikh Said was executed for separatism. The Sheikh Said rebellion was much larger, and prompted Turkey to stop pursuing Kurdish territories outside of its borders, and implement stricter repressions on Kurds. Many Kurds began to view Turkey as an occupier, and launched a series of revolts. The repressive Turkish policies worsened during the 1960s and began to radicalize more Kurdish nationalists. The PKK was founded in 1978, and took up arms in 1984, with its motives being to capture all Kurdish territories in Turkey and end the occupation. However, in 1993, Abdullah Öcalan rejected independence, claiming that Kurds had been part of Turkey for "1,000 years", and that their conflict was only against the tyrannical governments.

== See also ==
- Incorporation of Xinjiang into the People's Republic of China
