= Dayılar, Mazgirt =

Village in Tunceli Province, Turkey

Dayılar
- Village
- Location within Turkey
- Coordinates: 39.039°N 39.787°E
- Country: Turkey
- Province: Tunceli
- District: Mazgirt
- Population (2021): 14
- Time zone: UTC+3 (TRT)

Dayılar (Kurdish: Qeceran) is a village in the Mazgirt District, Tunceli Province, Turkey. The village is populated by Kurds of non-tribal affiliation and had a population of 14 in 2021.

The hamlet of Bonçuklu is attached to the village.
