= Özdek, Mazgirt =

Village in Tunceli Province, Turkey

Özdek
- Village
- Location within Turkey
- Coordinates: 38.952°N 39.794°E
- Country: Turkey
- Province: Tunceli
- District: Mazgirt
- Population (2021): 82
- Time zone: UTC+3 (TRT)

Özdek (Kurdish: Bilan) is a village in the Mazgirt District, Tunceli Province, Turkey. The village is populated by Kurds of the Izol tribe and had a population of 82 in 2021.

The hamlet of Yuvak is attached to the village.
