= Balkan, Mazgirt =

Village in Tunceli Province, Turkey

Balkan
- Village
- Location within Turkey
- Coordinates: 38.930°N 39.652°E
- Country: Turkey
- Province: Tunceli
- District: Mazgirt
- Population (2021): 52
- Time zone: UTC+3 (TRT)

Balkan (Kurdish: Ilanli) is a village in the Mazgirt District, Tunceli Province, Turkey. The village is populated by Kurds of the Hormek tribe and had a population of 52 in 2021.

The hamlets of Ardıçlı, Borukum and Çangal are attached to the village.
