= Kurdistan Socialist Party (Turkey) =

Kurdistan Socialist Party Partiya Sosyalîst a Kurdistan
- Founder: Kemal Burkay
- Founded: Late 1974
- Membership: 240 (according to data from 2020)
- Ideology: Socialism, Kurdish interests

Party flag
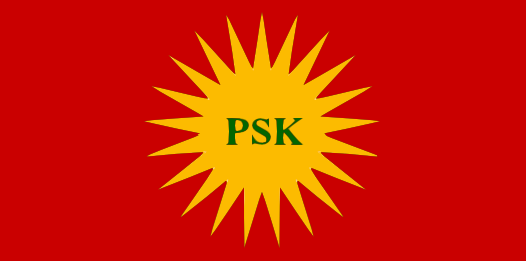

Party members holding PSK flags

The Kurdistan Socialist Party (PSK) (Kurdish: Partiya Sosyalîst a Kurdistan) is a Kurdish political Party based in Turkey. It was founded in late 1974 by Kemal Burkay. According to official data, from 2020 the party has 240 members.
