= Çatköy, Mazgirt =

Village in Tunceli Province, Turkey

Çatköy
- Village
- Location within Turkey
- Coordinates: 38.969°N 39.782°E
- Country: Turkey
- Province: Tunceli
- District: Mazgirt
- Population (2021): 44
- Time zone: UTC+3 (TRT)

Çatköy (Kurdish: Çet) is a village in the Mazgirt District, Tunceli Province, Turkey. The village is populated by Kurds of the Izol and Şadiyan tribes and had a population of 44 in 2021.
