= Danaburan, Mazgirt =

Village in Tunceli Province, Turkey

Danaburan
- Village
- Location within Turkey
- Coordinates: 38.961°N 39.658°E
- Country: Turkey
- Province: Tunceli
- District: Mazgirt
- Population (2021): 82
- Time zone: UTC+3 (TRT)

Danaburan (Kurdish: Talabûran) is a village in the Mazgirt District, Tunceli Province, Turkey. It is populated by 82 Kurds of the Izol and Şadiyan tribes as of 2021.
