= Gümüşgün, Mazgirt =

Village in Tunceli Province, Turkey

Gümüşgün
- Village
- Location within Turkey
- Coordinates: 39.020°N 39.677°E
- Country: Turkey
- Province: Tunceli
- District: Mazgirt
- Population (2021): 48
- Time zone: UTC+3 (TRT)

Gümüşgün (Kurdish: Gawan) is a village in the Mazgirt District, Tunceli Province, Turkey. The village is populated by Kurds of the Xiran tribe and had a population of 48 in 2021.

The hamlets of Kaman, Kaşıklı and Yongalı are attached to the village.
