= Sökücek, Mazgirt =

Village in Tunceli Province, Turkey

Sökücek
- Village
- Location within Turkey
- Coordinates: 38.919°N 39.855°E
- Country: Turkey
- Province: Tunceli
- District: Mazgirt
- Population (2021): 38
- Time zone: UTC+3 (TRT)

Sökücek (Kurdish: Axkilîs) is a village in the Mazgirt District, Tunceli Province, Turkey. The village is populated by Kurds of the Izol tribe and had a population of 38 in 2021.

The hamlets of Çobanlı and Uzunyol are attached to the village.
