= Güleç, Mazgirt =

Village in Tunceli Province, Turkey

Güleç
- Village
- Location within Turkey
- Coordinates: 39.031°N 39.823°E
- Country: Turkey
- Province: Tunceli
- District: Mazgirt
- Population (2021): 30
- Time zone: UTC+3 (TRT)

Güleç (Kurdish: Goma Qerêj) is a village in the Mazgirt District, Tunceli Province, Turkey. The village is populated by Kurds of the Hormek tribe and had a population of 30 in 2021.

The hamlet of Ballıca is attached to the village.
