= Yenibudak, Mazgirt =

Village in Tunceli Province, Turkey

Yenibudak
- Village
- Location within Turkey
- Coordinates: 38.975°N 39.615°E
- Country: Turkey
- Province: Tunceli
- District: Mazgirt
- Population (2021): 17
- Time zone: UTC+3 (TRT)

Yenibudak (Kurdish: Tarpasor) is a village in the Mazgirt District, Tunceli Province, Turkey. The village is populated by Kurds of the Alan, Bamasur and Bahtiyar tribes and had a population of 17 in 2021.

The hamlet of Söğüt is attached to the village.
