= Temürtaht, Mazgirt =

Village in Tunceli Province, Turkey

Temürtaht
- Village
- Location within Turkey
- Coordinates: 38.966°N 39.596°E
- Country: Turkey
- Province: Tunceli
- District: Mazgirt
- Population (2021): 94
- Time zone: UTC+3 (TRT)

Temürtaht (Kurdish: Temirtax) is a village in the Mazgirt District, Tunceli Province, Turkey. The village is populated by Kurds of the Alan tribe and had a population of 94 in 2021.
