= Yazeli, Mazgirt =

Village in Tunceli Province, Turkey

Yazeli
- Village
- Location within Turkey
- Coordinates: 38.961°N 39.692°E
- Country: Turkey
- Province: Tunceli
- District: Mazgirt
- Population (2021): 61
- Time zone: UTC+3 (TRT)

Yazeli (Kurdish: Kirzî) is a village in the Mazgirt District, Tunceli Province, Turkey. The village is populated by Kurds of the Şadiyan tribe and had a population of 61 in 2021.
