= Gelinpınar, Mazgirt =

Village in Tunceli Province, Turkey

Gelinpınar
- Village
- Location within Turkey
- Coordinates: 38.912°N 39.703°E
- Country: Turkey
- Province: Tunceli
- District: Mazgirt
- Population (2021): 34
- Time zone: UTC+3 (TRT)

Gelinpınar (Kurdish: Şomî) is a village in the Mazgirt District, Tunceli Province, Turkey. The village is populated by Kurds of the Şadiyan and Xiran tribes and had a population of 34 in 2021.

The hamlet of Velişeyh is attached to the village.
