= Sülüntaş, Mazgirt =

Village in Tunceli Province, Turkey

Sülüntaş
- Village
- Location within Turkey
- Coordinates: 38.940°N 39.823°E
- Country: Turkey
- Province: Tunceli
- District: Mazgirt
- Population (2021): 74
- Time zone: UTC+3 (TRT)

Sülüntaş, formerly known as Kardere, (Kurdish: Karê) is a village in the Mazgirt District, Tunceli Province, Turkey. The village is populated by Kurds of the Izol and Şadiyan tribes and had a population of 74 in 2021.

The hamlet of Pınarönü is attached to the village.
