= İbimahmut, Mazgirt =

Village in Tunceli Province, Turkey

İbimahmut
- Village
- Location within Turkey
- Coordinates: 39.026°N 39.788°E
- Country: Turkey
- Province: Tunceli
- District: Mazgirt
- Population (2021): 84
- Time zone: UTC+3 (TRT)

İbimahmut (Kurdish: Îwêmemûd) is a village in the Mazgirt District, Tunceli Province, Turkey. The village is populated by Kurds of the Hormek tribe and had a population of 84 in 2021.

The hamlets of Arılar, Devrişler, Karıncalı, Medet, Murat and Ortaklar are attached to the village.
