= Kuşaklı, Mazgirt =

Village in Tunceli Province, Turkey

Kuşaklı
- Village
- Location in Turkey
- Coordinates: 38.959°N 39.865°E
- Country: Turkey
- Province: Tunceli
- District: Mazgirt
- Population (2021): 24
- Time zone: UTC+3 (TRT)

Kuşaklı (Kurdish: Mankirag) is a village in the Mazgirt District, Tunceli Province, Turkey. The village is populated by Kurds of the Izol tribe and had a population of 24 in 2021.

The hamlet of Sefer is attached to the village.
