= Avunca, Mazgirt =

Village in Tunceli Province, Turkey

Avunca
- Village
- Location within Turkey
- Coordinates: 39.000°N 39.678°E
- Country: Turkey
- Province: Tunceli
- District: Mazgirt
- Population (2021): 42
- Time zone: UTC+3 (TRT)

Avunca (Kurdish: Kaştûn) is a village in the Mazgirt District, Tunceli Province, Turkey. The village is populated by Kurds of the Xiran tribe and had a population of 42 in 2021.

The hamlet of Karayazı is attached to the village.
