= Göktepe, Mazgirt =

Village in Tunceli Province, Turkey

Göktepe
- Village
- Location within Turkey
- Coordinates: 38.930°N 39.618°E
- Country: Turkey
- Province: Tunceli
- District: Mazgirt
- Population (2021): 205
- Time zone: UTC+3 (TRT)

Göktepe (Kurdish: Goydep) is a village in the Mazgirt District, Tunceli Province, Turkey. The village is populated by Kurds of the Alan, Bamasur, Izol, Şadiyan and Xiran tribes and had a population of 205 in 2021.
