= Bulgurcular, Mazgirt =

Village in Tunceli Province, Turkey

Bulgurcular
- Village
- Location within Turkey
- Coordinates: 38.992°N 39.694°E
- Country: Turkey
- Province: Tunceli
- District: Mazgirt
- Population (2021): 43
- Time zone: UTC+3 (TRT)

Bulgurcular (Kurdish: Germîsî) is a village in the Mazgirt District, Tunceli Province, Turkey. The village is populated by Kurds of the Izol and Xiran tribes and had a population of 43 in 2021.

The hamlet of İkiz is attached to the village.
