= Yeldeğen, Mazgirt =

Village in Tunceli Province, Turkey

Yeldeğen
- Village
- Location within Turkey
- Coordinates: 38.995°N 39.792°E
- Country: Turkey
- Province: Tunceli
- District: Mazgirt
- Population (2021): 47
- Time zone: UTC+3 (TRT)

Yeldeğen (Kurdish: Şowag) is a village in the Mazgirt District, Tunceli Province, Turkey. The village is populated by Kurds of the Bamasur tribe and had a population of 47 in 2021.
