= Ortadurak, Mazgirt =

Village in Tunceli Province, Turkey

Ortadurak
- Village
- Location within Turkey
- Coordinates: 38.826°N 39.686°E
- Country: Turkey
- Province: Tunceli
- District: Mazgirt
- Population (2021): 20
- Time zone: UTC+3 (TRT)

Ortadurak (Kurdish: Çelxedan) is a village in the Mazgirt District, Tunceli Province, Turkey. The village is populated by Kurds of the Hormek and Izol tribes and had a population of 20 in 2021.

The hamlets of Bahşiş and Sallar are attached to the village.
