= Karayusuf, Mazgirt =

Village in Tunceli Province, Turkey

Karayusuf
- Village
- Location within Turkey
- Coordinates: 38.840°N 39.616°E
- Country: Turkey
- Province: Tunceli
- District: Mazgirt
- Population (2021): 33
- Time zone: UTC+3 (TRT)

Karayusuf is a village in the Mazgirt District, Tunceli Province, Turkey. The village is populated by Kurds and had a population of 33 in 2021.

The hamlets of Biçer and Erikli are attached to the village.
