= Ağaçardı, Mazgirt =

Village in Tunceli Province, Turkey

Ağaçardı
- Village
- Location within Turkey
- Coordinates: 38.980°N 39.675°E
- Country: Turkey
- Province: Tunceli
- District: Mazgirt
- Population (2021): 109
- Time zone: UTC+3 (TRT)

Ağaçardı (Kurdish: Şorde) is a village in the Mazgirt District, Tunceli Province, Turkey. The village is populated by Kurds of the Hormek tribe and had a population of 109 in 2021.
