= Aydınlık, Mazgirt =

Village in Tunceli Province, Turkey

Aydınlık
- Village
- Location within Turkey
- Coordinates: 38.921°N 39.831°E
- Country: Turkey
- Province: Tunceli
- District: Mazgirt
- Population (2021): 27
- Time zone: UTC+3 (TRT)

Aydınlık (Kurdish: Canig) is a village in the Mazgirt District, Tunceli Province, Turkey. The village is populated by Kurds of the Izol, Lolan and Şadiyan tribes and had a population of 27 in 2021.

The hamlets of Direkli and Ziyaretderesi are attached to the village.
