= İsmailli, Mazgirt =

Village in Tunceli Province, Turkey

İsmailli
- Village
- Location within Turkey
- Coordinates: 38.891°N 39.622°E
- Country: Turkey
- Province: Tunceli
- District: Mazgirt
- Population (2021): 128
- Time zone: UTC+3 (TRT)

İsmailli (Kurdish: Îsmaîlî) is a village in the Mazgirt District, Tunceli Province, Turkey. The village is populated by Kurds of the Alan, Bamasur and Xiran tribes and had a population of 128 in 2021.

The hamlet of Küllüce is attached to the village.
