= Yukarıoyumca, Mazgirt =

Village in Tunceli Province, Turkey

Yukarıoyumca
- Village
- Location within Turkey
- Coordinates: 39.013°N 39.644°E
- Country: Turkey
- Province: Tunceli
- District: Mazgirt
- Population (2021): 28
- Time zone: UTC+3 (TRT)

Yukarıoyumca (Kurdish: Sindama jor) is a village in the Mazgirt District, Tunceli Province, Turkey. The village is populated by Kurds of the Hormek tribe and had a population of 28 in 2021.
