= Geçitveren, Mazgirt =

Village in Tunceli Province, Turkey

Geçitveren
- Village
- Location within Turkey
- Coordinates: 38.996°N 39.838°E
- Country: Turkey
- Province: Tunceli
- District: Mazgirt
- Population (2021): 92
- Time zone: UTC+3 (TRT)

Geçitveren (Kurdish: Rîçik) is a village in the Mazgirt District, Tunceli Province, Turkey. The village is populated by Kurds of the Izol tribe and had a population of 92 in 2021.

The hamlets of Akpınar, Dalmahallesi and Tepebaşı are attached to the village.
