= Aslanyurdu, Mazgirt =

Village in Tunceli Province, Turkey

Aslanyurdu
- Village
- Location within Turkey
- Coordinates: 38.976°N 39.559°E
- Country: Turkey
- Province: Tunceli
- District: Mazgirt
- Population (2021): 194
- Time zone: UTC+3 (TRT)

Aslanyurdu (Kurdish: Lazwan) is a village in the Mazgirt District, Tunceli Province, Turkey. The village is populated by Kurds of the Alan, Xiran tribes and of non-tribal affiliation. It had a population of 194 in 2021.

The hamlets of Aşağıçanakcı and Yukarıçanakçı are attached to the village.
