= Karşıkonak, Mazgirt =

Village in Tunceli Province, Turkey

Karşıkonak
- Village
- Location within Turkey
- Coordinates: 38.842°N 39.693°E
- Country: Turkey
- Province: Tunceli
- District: Mazgirt
- Population (2021): 64
- Time zone: UTC+3 (TRT)

Karşıkonak (Kurdish: Hoşî, Xoş) is a village in the Mazgirt District, Tunceli Province, Turkey. The village is populated by Kurds of the Şadiyan tribe and had a population of 64 in 2021.

The hamlets of Alikadı, Çayağzı and Denik are attached to the village.
