= Yaşaroğlu, Mazgirt =

Village in Tunceli Province, Turkey

Yaşaroğlu
- Village
- Location within Turkey
- Coordinates: 38.976°N 39.854°E
- Country: Turkey
- Province: Tunceli
- District: Mazgirt
- Population (2021): 78
- Time zone: UTC+3 (TRT)

Yaşaroğlu (Kurdish: Goman) is a village in the Mazgirt District, Tunceli Province, Turkey. The village is populated by Kurds of the Izol tribe and had a population of 78 in 2021.

The hamlets of Bütünlü, Dalbahçe, Subaşı and Yaşar are attached to the village.
