= Dallıbel, Mazgirt =

Village in Tunceli Province, Turkey

Dallıbel
- Village
- Location within Turkey
- Coordinates: 39.047°N 39.749°E
- Country: Turkey
- Province: Tunceli
- District: Mazgirt
- Population (2021): 66
- Time zone: UTC+3 (TRT)

Dallıbel (Kurdish: Beroj) is a village in the Mazgirt District, Tunceli Province, Turkey. The village is populated by Kurds of the Hormek tribe and had a population of 66 in 2021.

The hamlets of Aralık, Çayırlı, Meşelik, Oruç, Uğurlu and Yarış are attached to the village.
