= Karsan, Mazgirt =

Village in Tunceli Province, Turkey

Karsan
- Village
- Location within Turkey
- Coordinates: 38.832°N 39.788°E
- Country: Turkey
- Province: Tunceli
- District: Mazgirt
- Population (2021): 131
- Time zone: UTC+3 (TRT)

Karsan (Kurdish: Garsiyan) is a village in the Mazgirt District, Tunceli Province, Turkey. The village is populated by Kurds of the Hormek tribe and had a population of 131 in 2021.

The hamlet of Baltacık is attached to the village.
