= Dazkaya, Mazgirt =

Village in Tunceli Province, Turkey

Dazkaya
- Village
- Location within Turkey
- Coordinates: 39.014°N 39.521°E
- Country: Turkey
- Province: Tunceli
- District: Mazgirt
- Population (2021): 17
- Time zone: UTC+3 (TRT)

Dazkaya (Kurdish: Hazorig) is a village in the Mazgirt District, Tunceli Province, Turkey. The village is populated by Kurds of the Alan, Milan and Heyderan tribes and had a population of 17 in 2021.

The hamlet of Ören is attached to the village.
