= Anıtçınar, Mazgirt =

Village in Tunceli Province, Turkey

Anıtçınar
- Village
- Location within Turkey
- Coordinates: 38.975°N 39.846°E
- Country: Turkey
- Province: Tunceli
- District: Mazgirt
- Population (2021): 57
- Time zone: UTC+3 (TRT)

Anıtçınar (Kurdish: Coşik) is a village in the Mazgirt District, Tunceli Province, Turkey. The village is populated by Kurds of the Izol tribe and had a population of 57 in 2021.

The hamlets of Maltepe and Yumrukaya are attached to the village.
