= Kızılcık, Mazgirt =

Village in Tunceli Province, Turkey

Kızılcık
- Village
- Location within Turkey
- Coordinates: 38.900°N 39.646°E
- Country: Turkey
- Province: Tunceli
- District: Mazgirt
- Population (2021): 80
- Time zone: UTC+3 (TRT)

Kızılcık (Kurdish: Qizilcix) is a village in the Mazgirt District, Tunceli Province, Turkey. The village is populated by Kurds of the Izol, Lolan and Şadiyan tribes and had a population of 80 in 2021.
