= Alhan, Mazgirt =

Village in Tunceli Province, Turkey

Alhan
- Village
- Location within Turkey
- Coordinates: 39.043°N 39.770°E
- Country: Turkey
- Province: Tunceli
- District: Mazgirt
- Population (2021): 50
- Time zone: UTC+3 (TRT)

Alhan (Kurdish: Alxan) is a village in the Mazgirt District, Tunceli Province, Turkey. The village is populated by Kurds of the Hormek tribe and had a population of 50 in 2021.

The hamlet of Delik is attached to the village.
