= Alanyazı, Mazgirt =

Village in Tunceli Province, Turkey

Alanyazı
- Village
- Location within Turkey
- Coordinates: 38.980°N 39.691°E
- Country: Turkey
- Province: Tunceli
- District: Mazgirt
- Population (2021): 58
- Time zone: UTC+3 (TRT)

Alanyazı (Kurdish: Xozinkêx) is a village in the Mazgirt District, Tunceli Province, Turkey. The village is populated by Kurds of the Hormek and Şadiyan tribes and had a population of 58 in 2021.
