= Akpazar, Mazgirt =

Municipality in Tunceli Province, Turkey

Akpazar
- Municipality
- Location in Turkey
- Coordinates: 38.849°N 39.678°E
- Country: Turkey
- Province: Tunceli
- District: Mazgirt
- Population (2021): 1,939
- Time zone: UTC+3 (TRT)

Akpazar (Kurdish: Perî) is a municipality (belde) in the Mazgirt District, Tunceli Province, Turkey. It had a population of 1,939 in 2021 and is mainly populated by Kurds of different tribal affiliations.

The neighborhoods of Akpazar are Çarşıbaşı, Elmalık, Güneşdere, Güneyharman, Karabulut, Kepektaşı, Kuşçu and Örs.
