= Oymadal, Mazgirt =

Village in Tunceli Province, Turkey

Oymadal
- Village
- Location within Turkey
- Coordinates: 39.036°N 39.698°E
- Country: Turkey
- Province: Tunceli
- District: Mazgirt
- Population (2021): 36
- Time zone: UTC+3 (TRT)

Oymadal (Kurdish: Mezra reş) is a village in the Mazgirt District, Tunceli Province, Turkey. The village is populated by Kurds of the Hormek and Kurêşan tribes and had a population of 36 in 2021.

The hamlets of Dibekli, Şenyurt and Topan are attached to the village.
