= Kartutan, Mazgirt =

Village in Tunceli Province, Turkey

Kartutan
- Village
- Location within Turkey
- Coordinates: 38.987°N 39.764°E
- Country: Turkey
- Province: Tunceli
- District: Mazgirt
- Population (2021): 16
- Time zone: UTC+3 (TRT)

Kartutan (Kurdish: Lodek) is a village in the Mazgirt District, Tunceli Province, Turkey. The village is populated by Kurds of the Bamasur tribe and had a population of 16 2021.
