= Doğanlı, Mazgirt =

Village in Tunceli Province, Turkey

Doğanlı
- Village
- Location within Turkey
- Coordinates: 39.002°N 39.709°E
- Country: Turkey
- Province: Tunceli
- District: Mazgirt
- Population (2021): 47
- Time zone: UTC+3 (TRT)

Doğanlı (Kurdish: Qûrcik) is a village in the Mazgirt District, Tunceli Province, Turkey. The village is populated by Kurds of the Xiran tribe and had a population of 47 in 2021.
