= Koyunuşağı, Mazgirt =

Village in Tunceli Province, Turkey

Koyunuşağı
- Village
- Location within Turkey
- Coordinates: 39.019°N 39.838°E
- Country: Turkey
- Province: Tunceli
- District: Mazgirt
- Population (2021): 44
- Time zone: UTC+3 (TRT)

Koyunuşağı (Kurdish: Zerkan) is a village in the Mazgirt District, Tunceli Province, Turkey. The village is populated by Kurds of the Hormek tribe and had a population of 44 in 2021.

The hamlets of Gölek, Oymataş and Tabaklı are attached to the village.
