= Demirkazık, Mazgirt =

Village in Tunceli Province, Turkey

Demirkazık
- Village
- Location within Turkey
- Coordinates: 38.991°N 39.625°E
- Country: Turkey
- Province: Tunceli
- District: Mazgirt
- Population (2021): 10
- Time zone: UTC+3 (TRT)

Demirkazık (Kurdish: Xoçewanis) is a village in the Mazgirt District, Tunceli Province, Turkey. The village is populated by Kurds of the Alan, Bamasur and Şadiyan tribes and had a population of 10 in 2021.

The hamlet of İlanlı is attached to the village.
