= Akyünlü, Mazgirt =

Village in Tunceli Province, Turkey

Akyünlü
- Village
- Location within Turkey
- Coordinates: 39.044°N 39.543°E
- Country: Turkey
- Province: Tunceli
- District: Mazgirt
- Population (2021): 27
- Time zone: UTC+3 (TRT)

Akyünlü (Kurdish: Çantur) is a village in the Mazgirt District, Tunceli Province, Turkey. The village is populated by Kurds of the Kurêşan tribe and had a population of 27 in 2021.

The hamlets of Arpabük and Beydamı are attached to the village.
