= Akkavak, Mazgirt =

Village in Tunceli Province, Turkey

Akkavak
- Village
- Location within Turkey
- Coordinates: 38.978°N 39.747°E
- Country: Turkey
- Province: Tunceli
- District: Mazgirt
- Population (2021): 43
- Time zone: UTC+3 (TRT)

Akkavak (Kurdish: Şilk) is a village in the Mazgirt District, Tunceli Province, Turkey. The village is populated by Kurds of the Şadiyan tribe and had a population of 43 in 2021.

The hamlets of Atalay, Çiğdemli and İsmail are attached to the village.
