= Darıkent, Mazgirt =

Village in Tunceli Province, Turkey

Darıkent
- Village
- Location within Turkey
- Coordinates: 38.969°N 39.810°E
- Country: Turkey
- Province: Tunceli
- District: Mazgirt
- Population (2021): 254
- Time zone: UTC+3 (TRT)

Darıkent (Kurdish: Moxendî) is a village in the Mazgirt District, Tunceli Province, Turkey. Before the 2013 reorganisation, it was a town (belde). The village is populated by Kurds of the Bamasur and Hormek tribes and had a population of 254 in 2021.
