= Demirci, Mazgirt =

Village in Tunceli Province, Turkey

Demirci
- Village
- Location within Turkey
- Coordinates: 38.831°N 39.652°E
- Country: Turkey
- Province: Tunceli
- District: Mazgirt
- Population (2021): 57
- Time zone: UTC+3 (TRT)

Demirci (Kurdish: Demircîyan) is a village in the Mazgirt District, Tunceli Province, Turkey. The village is populated by Kurds of non-tribal affiliation and had a population of 57 in 2021.

The hamlet of Kazandere is attached to the village.
