= Aşağıtarlacık, Mazgirt =

Village in Tunceli Province, Turkey

Aşağıtarlacık
- Village
- Location within Turkey
- Coordinates: 38.999°N 39.518°E
- Country: Turkey
- Province: Tunceli
- District: Mazgirt
- Population (2021): 47
- Time zone: UTC+3 (TRT)

Aşağıtarlacık (Kurdish: Hezirge) is a village in the Mazgirt District, Tunceli Province, Turkey. The village is populated by Kurds of the Suran and Xiran tribes and of non-tribal affiliation. It had a population of 47 in 2021.

The hamlet of Yukarıtarlacık is attached to the village.
