= Kızılkale, Mazgirt =

Village in Tunceli Province, Turkey

Kızılkale
- Village
- Location in Turkey
- Coordinates: 38.947°N 39.756°E
- Country: Turkey
- Province: Tunceli
- District: Mazgirt
- Population (2021): 135
- Time zone: UTC+3 (TRT)

Kızılkale (Kurdish: Dirban) is a village in the Mazgirt District, Tunceli Province, Turkey. The village is populated by Kurds of the Izol and Şadiyan tribes and had a population of 135 in 2021.

The hamlets of Dostar, Sivrice and Yılmaz are attached to the village.

== Notable people ==
- Kemal Burkay
