= Koçkuyusu, Mazgirt =

Village in Tunceli Province, Turkey

Koçkuyusu
- Village
- Location within Turkey
- Coordinates: 38.978°N 39.585°E
- Country: Turkey
- Province: Tunceli
- District: Mazgirt
- Population (2021): 56
- Time zone: UTC+3 (TRT)

Koçkuyusu (Kurdish: Dilmoli) is a village in the Mazgirt District, Tunceli Province, Turkey. The village is populated by Kurds of the Alan tribe and had a population of 56 in 2021.

The hamlet of Hüseyinağa is attached to the village.
