= Sarıkoç, Mazgirt =

Village in Tunceli Province, Turkey

Sarıkoç
- Village
- Location within Turkey
- Coordinates: 39.020°N 39.801°E
- Country: Turkey
- Province: Tunceli
- District: Mazgirt
- Population (2021): 44
- Time zone: UTC+3 (TRT)

Sarıkoç (Kurdish: Xiştan) is a village in the Mazgirt District, Tunceli Province, Turkey. The village is populated by Kurds of the Hormek tribe and had a population of 44 in 2021.

The hamlet of Dereağzı, Kalalı and Kırova are attached to the village.
