= Aşağıoyumca, Mazgirt =

Village in Tunceli Province, Turkey

Aşağıoyumca
- Village
- Location within Turkey
- Coordinates: 39.002°N 39.629°E
- Country: Turkey
- Province: Tunceli
- District: Mazgirt
- Population (2021): 16
- Time zone: UTC+3 (TRT)

Aşağıoyumca (Kurdish: Sindama jêr) is a village in the Mazgirt District, Tunceli Province, Turkey. The village is populated by Kurds of the Hormek tribe and had a population of 16 in 2021.

The hamlet of Kösoğlu is attached to the village.
