= Obrukkaşı, Mazgirt =

Village in Tunceli Province, Turkey

Obrukkaşı
- Village
- Location within Turkey
- Coordinates: 38.926°N 39.750°E
- Country: Turkey
- Province: Tunceli
- District: Mazgirt
- Population (2021): 16
- Time zone: UTC+3 (TRT)

Obrukkaşı (Kurdish: Lamkê) is a village in the Mazgirt District, Tunceli Province, Turkey. The village is populated by Kurds of the Şadiyan tribe and had a population of 16 in 2021.
