= Doğucak, Mazgirt =

Village in Tunceli Province, Turkey

Doğucak
- Village
- Location within Turkey
- Coordinates: 38.955°N 39.847°E
- Country: Turkey
- Province: Tunceli
- District: Mazgirt
- Population (2021): 75
- Time zone: UTC+3 (TRT)

Doğucak (Kurdish: Hulman) is a village in the Mazgirt District, Tunceli Province, Turkey. The village is populated by Kurds of the Izol tribe and had a population of 75 in 2021.

The hamlets of Gaz and Hacıyusuf are attached to the village.
