= Aktarla, Mazgirt =

Village in Tunceli Province, Turkey

Aktarla
- Village
- Location within Turkey
- Coordinates: 39.004°N 39.752°E
- Country: Turkey
- Province: Tunceli
- District: Mazgirt
- Population (2021): 62
- Time zone: UTC+3 (TRT)

Aktarla (Kurdish: Qurqurik) is a village in the Mazgirt District, Tunceli Province, Turkey. The village is populated by Kurds of the Bamasur tribe and had a population of 62 in 2021.

The hamlet of Koçayurt is attached to the village.
