= Öreniçi, Mazgirt =

Village in Tunceli Province, Turkey

Öreniçi
- Village
- Location within Turkey
- Coordinates: 39.037°N 39.731°E
- Country: Turkey
- Province: Tunceli
- District: Mazgirt
- Population (2021): 18
- Time zone: UTC+3 (TRT)

Öreniçi (Kurdish: Xirêwe) is a village in the Mazgirt District, Tunceli Province, Turkey. The village is populated by Kurds of the Hormek tribe and had a population of 18 in 2021.
