= Mazgirt District =

District of Tunceli Province, Turkey

- District
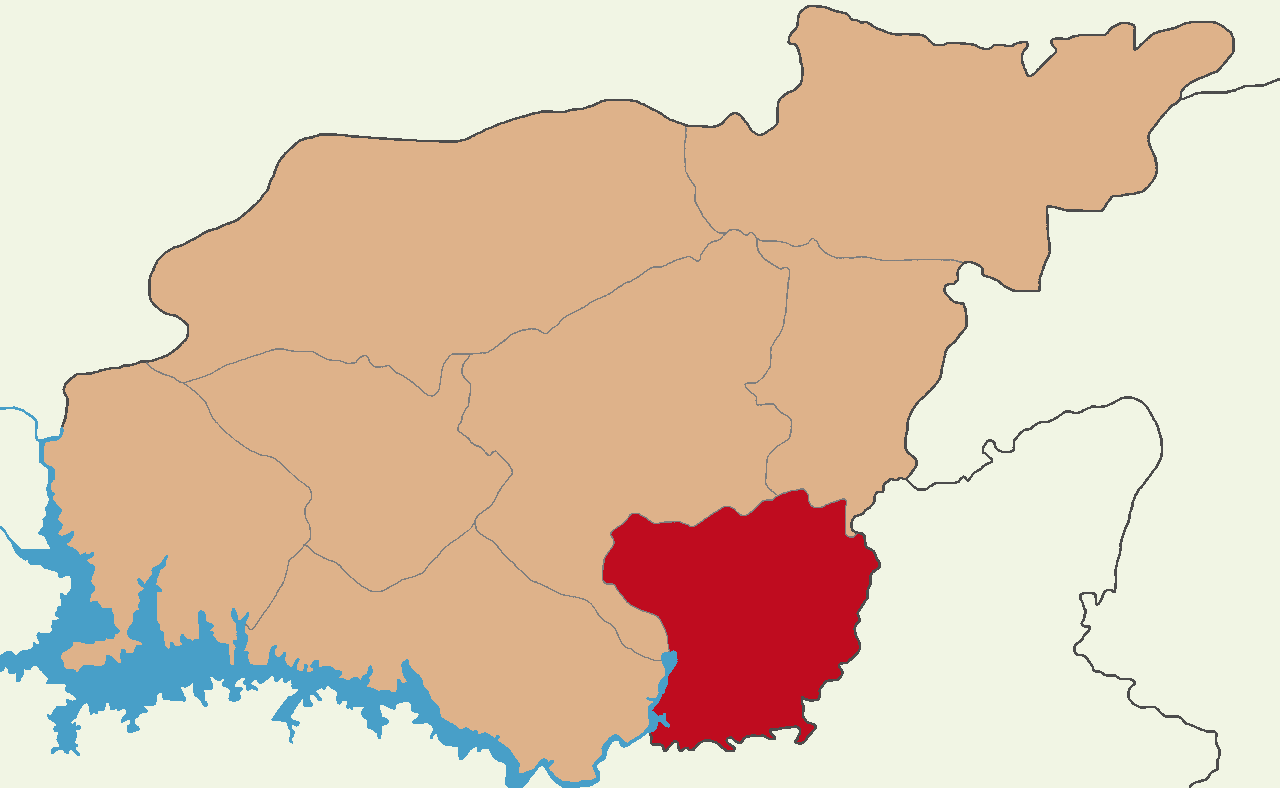
- Map showing Mazgirt District in Tunceli Province

- Location in Turkey
- Coordinates: 38°57′N 39°43′E
- Country: Turkey
- Province: Tunceli
- Seat: Mazgirt
- Area: 702 km^{2} (271 sq mi)
- Population (2021): 7,357
  - Density: 10.5/km^{2} (27.1/sq mi)
- Time zone: UTC+3 (TRT)
- Website: www.mazgirt.gov.tr

Mazgirt District is a district of Tunceli Province in Turkey. The town of Mazgirt is the seat and the district had a population of 7,357 in 2021. The kaymakam is Menderes Topçuoĝlu. Its area is 702 km^{2}.

== Composition ==
Beside the town of Mazgirt, the district encompasses the municipality of Akpazar, sixty-eight villages and ninety-eight hamlets.

=== Villages ===
1. Ağaçardı
2. Akdüven
3. Akkavak
4. Aktarla
5. Akyünlü
6. Alanyazı
7. Alhan
8. Anıtçınar
9. Aslanyurdu
10. Aşağıoyumca
11. Aşağıtarlacık
12. Ataçınarı
13. Avunca
14. Aydınlık
15. Ayvatlı
16. Balkan
17. Beşoluk
18. Beylermezraası
19. Bulgurcular
20. Çatköy
21. Dallıbel
22. Danaburan
23. Darıkent
24. Dayılar
25. Dazkaya
26. Demirci
27. Demirkazık
28. Doğanlı
29. Doğucak
30. Geçitveren
31. Gelincik
32. Gelinpınar
33. Göktepe
34. Güleç
35. Gümüşgün
36. İbimahmut
37. İsmailli
38. Kalaycı
39. Kaleköy
40. Karayusuf
41. Karsan
42. Karşıkonak
43. Kartutan
44. Kavaktepe
45. Kayacı
46. Kızılcık
47. Kızılkale
48. Koçkuyusu
49. Koyunuşağı
50. Kuşaklı
51. Kuşhane
52. Obrukkaşı
53. Obuzbaşı
54. Ortadurak
55. Ortaharman
56. Otlukaya
57. Oymadal
58. Öreniçi
59. Özdek
60. Sarıkoç
61. Sökücek
62. Sülüntaş
63. Temürtaht
64. Yaşaroğlu
65. Yazeli
66. Yeldeğen
67. Yenibudak
68. Yukarıoyumca
