= Otlukaya, Mazgirt =

Village in Tunceli Province, Turkey

Otlukaya
- Village
- Location within Turkey
- Coordinates: 39.032°N 39.740°E
- Country: Turkey
- Province: Tunceli
- District: Mazgirt
- Population (2021): 46
- Time zone: UTC+3 (TRT)

Otlukaya (Kurdish: Pûlan) is a village in the Mazgirt District, Tunceli Province, Turkey. The village is populated by Kurds of the Hormek tribe and had a population of 46 in 2021.

The hamlet of Kuşhane is attached to the village.
