= Akdüven, Mazgirt =

Village in Tunceli Province, Turkey

Akdüven
- Village
- Location within Turkey
- Coordinates: 39.021°N 39.865°E
- Country: Turkey
- Province: Tunceli
- District: Mazgirt
- Population (2021): 138
- Time zone: UTC+3 (TRT)

Akdüven (Kurdish: Ferec) is a village in the Mazgirt District, Tunceli Province, Turkey. The village is populated by Kurds of the Hormek tribe and had a population of 138 in 2021.

The hamlets of Dedebağ (Bağın) and Zerikan are attached to the village.
