= Obuzbaşı, Mazgirt =

Village in Tunceli Province, Turkey

Obuzbaşı
- Village
- Location within Turkey
- Coordinates: 38.884°N 39.824°E
- Country: Turkey
- Province: Tunceli
- District: Mazgirt
- Population (2021): 47
- Time zone: UTC+3 (TRT)

Obuzbaşı (Kurdish: Kûrkan) is a village in the Mazgirt District, Tunceli Province, Turkey. The village is populated by Kurds of the Izol and Xiran tribes and had a population of 47 in 2021.

The hamlets of Uçankuş and Zeynel are attached to the village.
