= Ayvatlı, Mazgirt =

Village in Tunceli Province, Turkey

Ayvatlı
- Village
- Location within Turkey
- Coordinates: 38.908°N 39.795°E
- Country: Turkey
- Province: Tunceli
- District: Mazgirt
- Population (2021): 39
- Time zone: UTC+3 (TRT)

Ayvatlı (Kurdish: Hêwedan) is a village in the Mazgirt District, Tunceli Province, Turkey. The village is populated by Kurds of the Izol and Şadiyan tribes and had a population of 39 in 2021.
