= Kavaktepe, Mazgirt =

Village in Tunceli Province, Turkey

Kavaktepe
- Village
- Location in Turkey
- Coordinates: 38.964°N 39.720°E
- Country: Turkey
- Province: Tunceli
- District: Mazgirt
- Population (2021): 35
- Time zone: UTC+3 (TRT)

Kavaktepe (Kurdish: Qerexdep) is a village in the Mazgirt District, Tunceli Province, Turkey. The village is populated by Kurds of the Şadiyan tribe and had a population of 35 in 2021.
