= Mazgirt =

Municipality in Tunceli Province, Turkey

- Municipality
- Location in Turkey
- Coordinates: 39°01′09″N 39°36′17″E
- Country: Turkey
- Province: Tunceli
- District: Mazgirt

Government
  - Mayor: Murat Becerikli (AKP)
- Population (2021): 1,344
- Time zone: UTC+3 (TRT)
- Website: www.mazgirt.bel.tr

Mazgirt (Armenian: Մեծկերտ, romanized: Medzgerd, lit. 'big town'; Kurdish: Mêzgir), is a town and seat of the Mazgirt District of the Tunceli Province in Turkey. It had a population of 1,344 in 2021.

The current mayor is Murat Becerikli from the Justice and Development Party (AKP).

The town has a number of interesting buildings, such as an abandoned castle, an old mosque, and an Armenian church which is soon to be renovated.

It is divided into the neighborhoods of Eltihatun and Yenimahalle.

== Geography ==
Mazgirt is located in a bowl-shaped depression in the heights overlooking the Munzur Su valley. On the west side of town is a rocky outcrop that has a commanding view of the brush-covered slopes below. This outcrop historically served as the castle rock.

The main road coming from Tunceli turns sharply southeast just beneath the castle rock and then becomes the main commercial street in town. There is a gentle slope uphill as it runs southeast to the main town square, which is where the high school is located. The historic Elti Hatun mosque and türbe are located further north, along with the old Armenian church of Surb Hakop.

Historically, Mazgirt was the start point of a route that led to Pülümür through wooded valleys and hills, thus connecting the Dersim region with the upper reaches of the Euphrates while bypassing the narrow Kutu Dere upstream from Tunceli.

== History ==
Historically a market town, Mazgirt was an important fortified settlement during the period of Arab rule (7th to 10th centuries). It lay in a border region and was likely connected to Bağın and then Kiğı by a road for defensive purposes.

In 1144, Arslan-Doğmuş, brother of the Artukid ruler Kara Arslan, seized Mazgirt and made it his capital. Mazgirt's high and relatively inaccessible position made it a good place for him to resist his brother's rule, but he died in 1148 after only four years in power and Kara Arslan took over Mazgirt.

== Monuments ==
=== Elte Hatun Cami ===
The medieval Elte Hatun Cami is built out of a dark purplish composite stone and consists of a main prayer hall with a smaller entrance hall adjoining it on the east side of the north wall. There is a garden on the east side of the complex, although the gate is usually kept locked. There is a çeşme or fountain outside the entrance hall on the north; inside the building on the same wall is a niche where water was also piped in. These were designed for worshippers to perform the ghusl washing required before prayer; the fountain outside would have been used mostly during summer while the one inside would have been used during winter.

The mosque was founded in 1252-3 by Elte Hatun, daughter of a prince named Süleyman. She probably belonged to the Seljuk dynasty, since Mazgirt had come under Seljuk control in 1234 when they annexed the principality of Harput. A medrese, which was probably founded at the same time as the mosque, formerly existed to the east; the garden wall was built over its remains.

=== Elte Hatun Türbesi ===
The Elte Hatun Türbesi is purportedly the tomb of the same Elte Hatun, but in reality this is unlikely - the carvings are of a much lower quality than the mosque's - and the türbe was probably built well after Elte Hatun's lifetime, perhaps in the 15th century. Whoever the tomb actually belongs to is unknown.

=== Castle ===
The castle rock is basically shaped like an elongated platform running from northwest to southeast. Steep cliffs provide a natural barrier on all sides except the southeast, which has a gentler slope. An inner rocky outcropping juts up from the main platform towards the northwest end. The castle walls are only standing in some places. The masonry that survives is mostly the same dark reddish-purple stone as the Elte Hatun mosque and likely date from the same period (mid-13th century). On the inner outcropping there is a circular pit carved out of the rock whose original purpose is unknown; a "rectangular block of masonry" built partly over its western side belonged to an old windmill that was built on the site at a later date.

=== Armenian churches ===
The Armenian church of Surb Hakop appears to date from the 16th or 17th century, although it was probably rebuilt from the ruins of an earlier church. The present structure is somewhat awkwardly proportioned - it seems truncated - and the previous building was probably larger than the one today. The remains of a second Armenian church, probably a basilica, is located on the northeast slope of the citadel. This one is hard to date but may have been built in the Middle Ages.
