= Kayacı, Mazgirt =

Village in Tunceli Province, Turkey

Kayacı
- Village
- Location within Turkey
- Coordinates: 38.890°N 39.801°E
- Country: Turkey
- Province: Tunceli
- District: Mazgirt
- Population (2021): 37
- Time zone: UTC+3 (TRT)

Kayacı (Kurdish: Qêçiyan) is a village in the Mazgirt District, Tunceli Province, Turkey. The village is populated by Kurds of the Bamasur and Izol tribes and had a population of 37 in 2021.

The hamlets of Güldermez and Mustafa are attached to the village.
