= Turkish war crimes =

Violations of the laws of war committed by Turkey

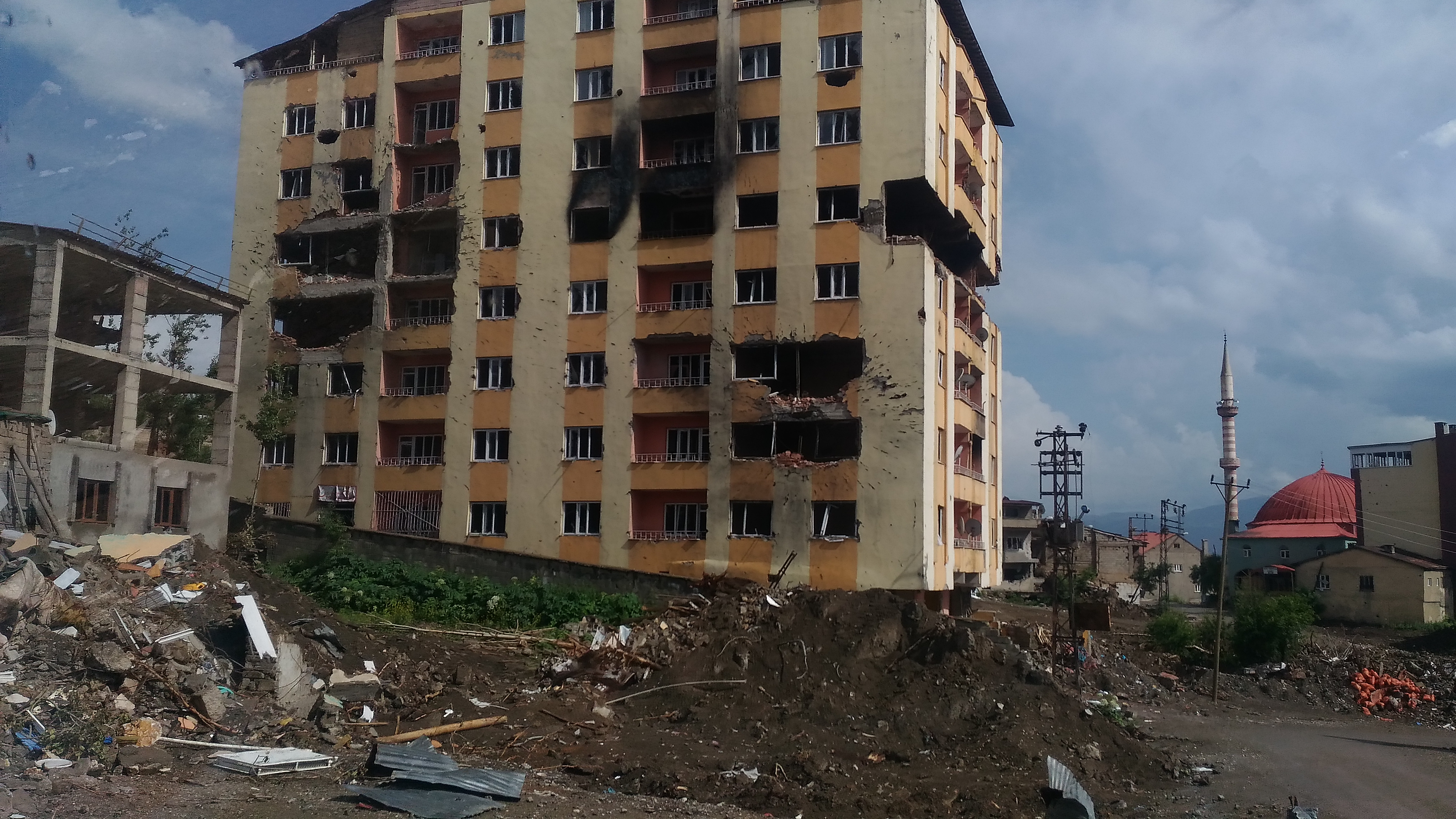
A building in Yüksekova, Hakkari Province, partly destroyed by tank shells from a Turkish operation in the 2016 Hakkari clashes.

Since the foundation of the Republic of Turkey, its official armed and paramilitary forces have committed numerous violations of international criminal law (including war crimes, crimes against humanity and the crime of genocide), and are also accused of aiding and abetting crimes committed by non-state actors, including rebel groups in Syria. Turkish war crimes have included massacres, torture, terrorism, deportation or forced displacement, kidnapping, sexual violence, looting, unlawful confinement, unlawful airstrikes and indiscriminate attacks on civilian structures.

The founders of the modern Turkish nation-state, who led the nationalist movement in the years following World War I, committed numerous atrocities during the War of Independence and continued many of the late Ottoman Empire's genocidal policies against Christian minorities, especially Armenians and Greeks. After its formal establishment in 1923, Turkey would perpetrate many human rights violations against Kurds (both inside and outside its borders) during the long running Kurdish–Turkish conflict. Turkey has faced many accusations of committing war crimes in other countries, including in Cyprus, Syria and Libya.

== Definition ==
War crimes are defined as acts which violate the laws and customs of war established by the Hague Conventions of 1899 and 1907, or acts that are grave breaches of the Geneva Conventions and Additional Protocol I and Additional Protocol II. The Fourth Geneva Convention of 1949 extends the protection of civilians and prisoners of war during military occupation, even if there is no armed resistance, for the period of one year after the end of hostilities. However, the occupying power should still be bound by several provisions of the convention as long as "such Power exercises the functions of government in such territory."

== Background ==
=== Ottoman genocides and campaigns of ethnic cleansing ===
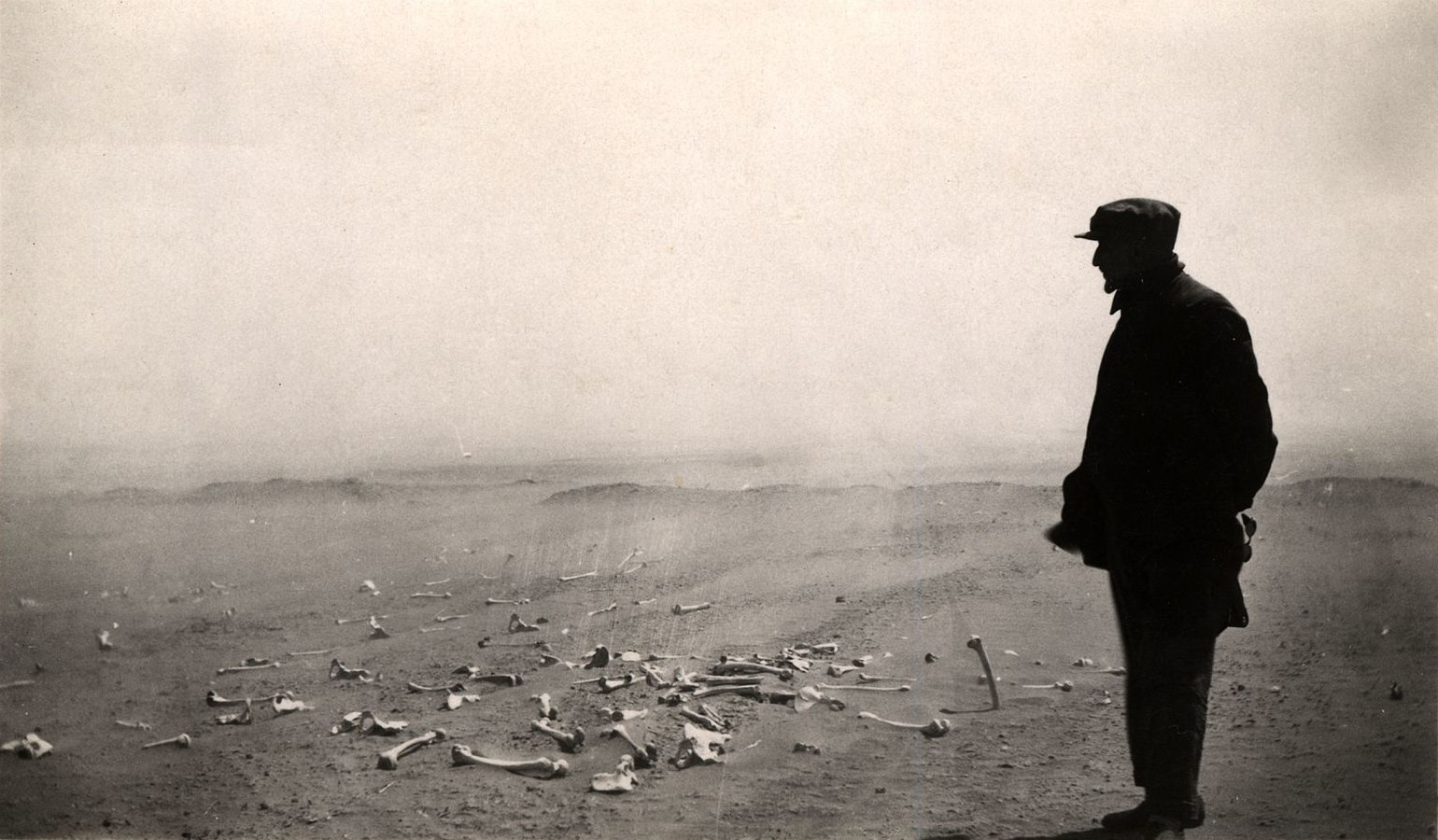
Remains of Armenians killed at the Deir ez-Zor camps, 1915

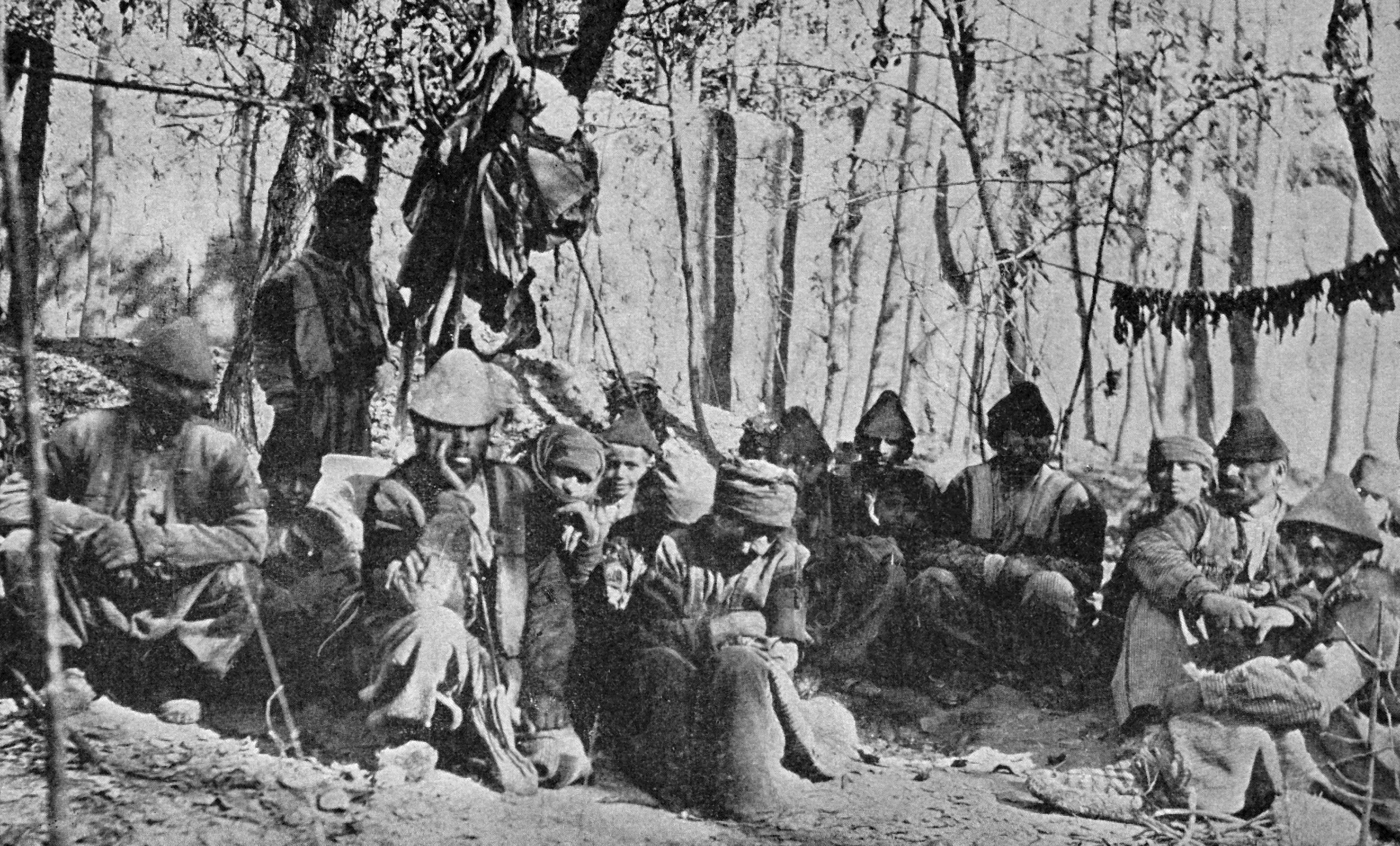
Assyrian refugees from Tyari and Tkhuma near Urmia, Iran in late 1915

In the final years of the Ottoman Empire's existence, the Committee of Union and Progress (CUP) – the Turkish nationalist political party that ruled over it – committed a genocide against the empire's Armenian population. The Ottomans carried out organised, systematic massacres and deportations of Armenians throughout World War I, and they portrayed acts of resistance by Armenians as rebellions in an attempt to justify their extermination campaign. In early 1915, a number of Armenians volunteered to join the Russian forces, and the Ottoman government used this as a pretext to issue the Tehcir Law (Law on Deportation), which authorised the deportation of Armenians from the Empire's eastern provinces to Syria between 1915 and 1918. The Armenians were intentionally marched to death, and a large number of them were attacked by Ottoman brigands. While the exact number of deaths is unknown, the International Association of Genocide Scholars estimates that 1.5 million Armenians were killed. The Ottoman Empire repeatedly denied the genocide was happening, and the government of Turkey has continued these denials, arguing that those who died were victims of inter-ethnic fighting, famine, or disease during World War I; these claims are rejected by most historians.

Other ethnic groups were also attacked by the Ottoman Empire during this period, including Assyrians and Greeks, and some scholars consider those events different parts of the same policy of extermination. An estimated 250,000 Assyrian Christians (about half of the population) and 350,000–750,000 Greeks were killed between 1915 and 1922. According to Rudolph Rummel, during 1900 and 1923, the Turks massacred between 3,500,000 and 4,300,000 Christian Greek, Armenian, Assyrian and other Christian groups.

== Turkish War of Independence ==
Vahagn Avedian argues that the Turkish War of Independence was not directed against the Allied Powers, but that its main objective was to get rid of non-Turkish minority groups. The Turkish National Movement, led by Mustafa Kemal Atatürk, maintained the aggressive policies of the CUP against Christians; most former members of the CUP joined the movement, and were active participants in the war.

Raymond Kévorkian states that "removing non-Turks from the sanctuary of Anatolia" was among the main activities of the Turkish Nationalists after World War I. Preventing Armenians and other Christians from returning home, and therefore allowing their properties to be retained by those who had stolen them during the war, was a key factor in securing popular support for the Turkish National Movement. Christian civilians were subjected to forced deportation to expel them from the country, a policy that continued after the war. These deportations were similar to those employed during the Armenian genocide, and caused many deaths. Many Greek men were conscripted into unarmed labor battalions where the death rate sometimes exceeded 90 percent. Over 1 million Greeks were expelled (as were all remaining Armenians in the areas of Diyarbekir, Mardin, Urfa, Harput, and Malatia), forced across the border into French-mandated Syria.

Historian Erik Sjöberg said that "It seems, in the end, unlikely that the Turkish Nationalist leaders, though secular in name, ever had any intention of allowing any sizeable non-Muslim minority to remain."

=== Turkish invasion of Armenia ===
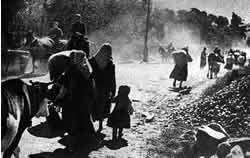
Armenians fleeing Kars during the Turkish invasion of Armenia (1920)

In a secret telegram to General Kâzım Karabekir (who would launch an invasion of Armenia in 1920), Foreign Minister Ahmet Muhtar Mollaoğlu stated that "the most important thing is to eliminate Armenia physically and politically". Rıza Nur, one of the Turkish delegates at Lausanne, wrote that "disposing of people of different races, languages and religions in our country is the most … vital issue". Avedian holds that the existence of the Armenian Republic was considered the "greatest threat" for the continuation of Turkish state, and that for this reason, they "fulfilled the genocidal policy of its CUP predecessor". After the Christian population was destroyed, the focus shifted to the Kurdish population.

The Turkish invasion and occupation of Armenia had drastic humanitarian consequences: between 60,000–198,000 Armenian civilians were killed and around 12,000–18,000 were taken prisoner to be used as forced labour. Women and children were subjected to sexual violence, and widespread looting of food and farming equipment led to widespread famine, and left 500,000 Armenians in extreme poverty.

=== Massacre of Armenians at Marash ===
During the 1920 Battle of Marash, thousands of repatriated Armenians were massacred by Turkish militias; a surgeon at a nearby hospital reported that around 3,000 Armenians at the Church of Saint Stephen had been killed by Turkish, Kurdish and Cherkess villagers. Some Armenians tried to hide in church buildings and schools, but eventually, all churches, and entire Armenian districts in Marash, were burnt to the ground. Early reports put the number of Armenian dead at no less than 16,000, although this was later revised down to 5,000–12,000, which were considered far more likely figures.

=== Samsun deportations ===
The Turkish National Movement continued the genocidal, Ottoman-era policies towards Greeks during the war of independence. During the late spring of 1921, armed militias led by Topal Osman looted and burned Greek settlements around Samsun and massacred the civilian Greek population. Those who were not already killed were deported, being sent on death marches into the Anatolian interior. On 16 June 1921, the Turkish nationalist government of Ankara authorized the deportation of all Greek males between ages 16 and 50 who remained in Samsun, and mass arrests of local Greeks began the same day; however, in practice, all Greeks in the area (including women, children and elderly men) became targets of deportations and death marches.

Roughly 21,000 people were deported from Samsun, and by September 1922, the city had almost no Greeks left.

=== Human rights violations at Smyrna ===
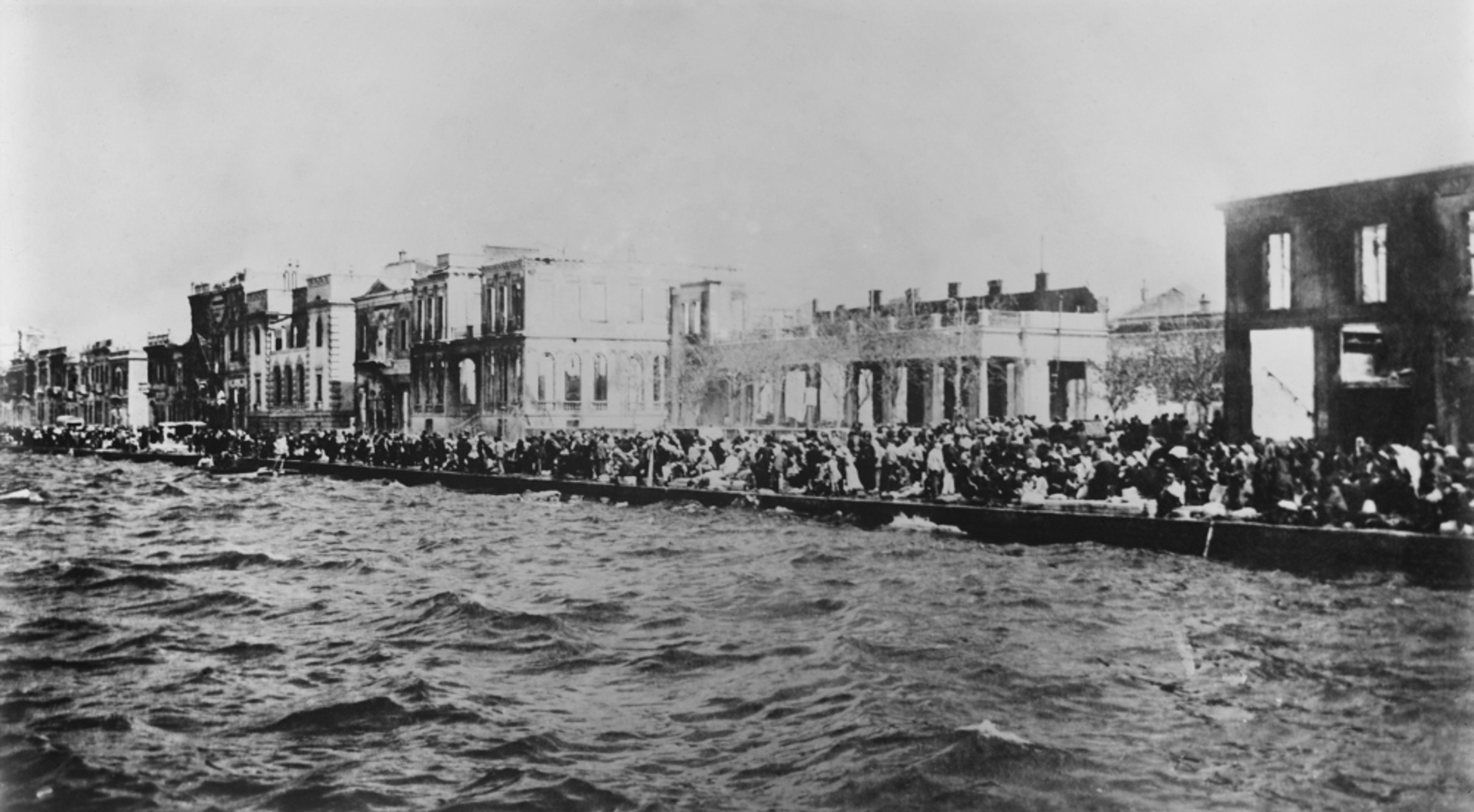
Thousands of people huddled around the waters edge in Smyrna, trying to escape the fire, 1922

After occupying the city of Smyrna on 9 September 1922, Turkish forces began to systemically target local Greeks and Armenians, committing massacres against them, looting their shops and homes, and sexually assaulting women. The Greek Orthodox Metropolitan bishop, Chrysostomos, was tortured and hacked to death by a Turkish mob. After a fire broke out in the city four days later, Turkish troops reportedly prevented Armenians and Greeks within the fire zone from fleeing. Turkish soldiers and irregulars periodically robbed Greek refugees, beating some, and arresting others who resisted. According to American naval captain Arthur Japy Hepburn (who witnessed the burning of the city), "every able-bodied Armenian man was hunted down and killed wherever found".

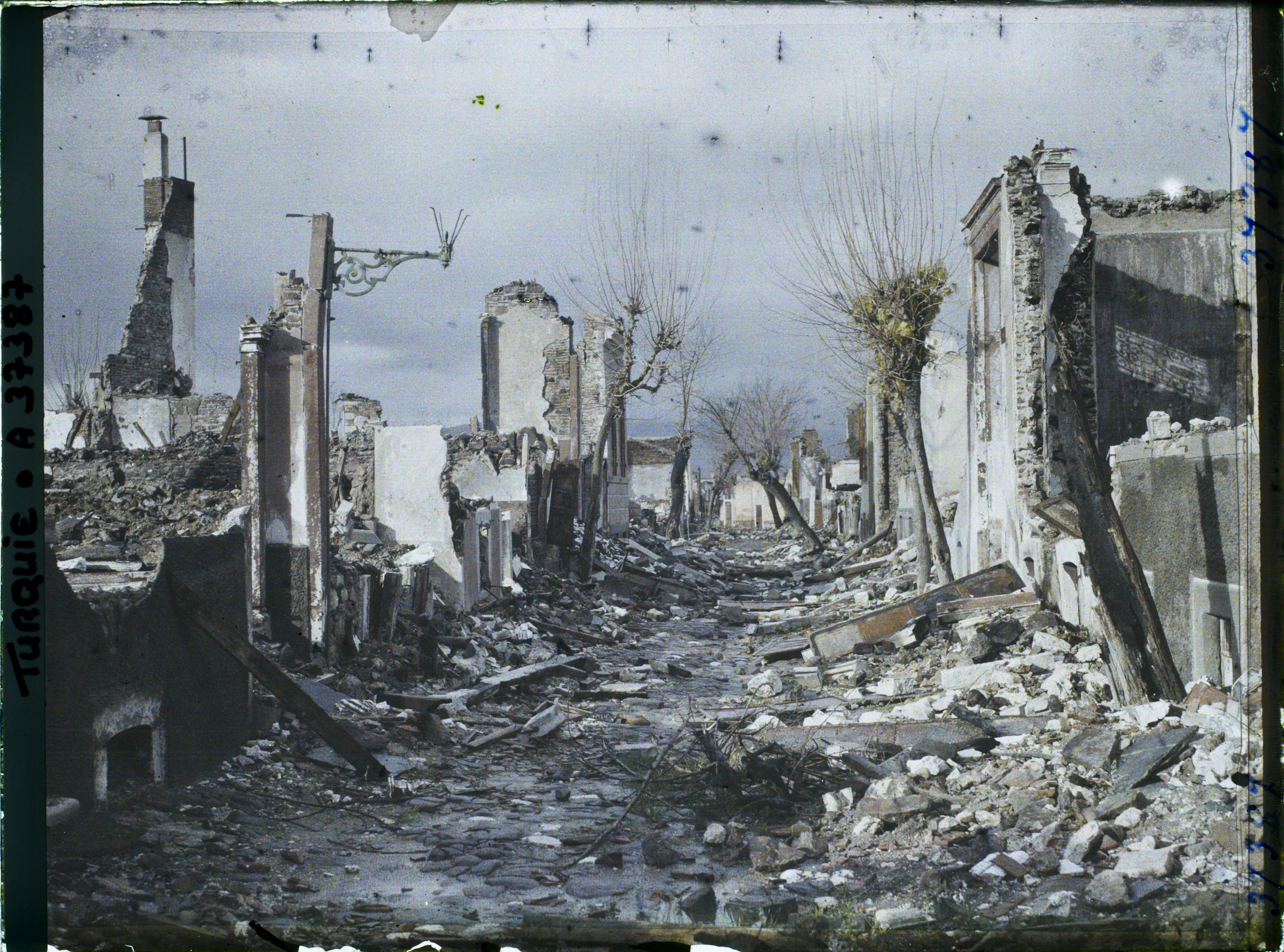
Ruins of Smyrna after the fire, 1922

The number of Greek and Armenian men deported from Smyrna to the interior of Anatolia, and the number who died as a result, varies across sources. Norman Naimark writes that 30,000 Greek and Armenian men were deported, where most of them died under brutal conditions. Dimitrije Đorđević puts the number of deportees at 25,000 and the number of deaths at labour battalions at 10,000. David Abulafia states that at least 100,000 Greeks were forcibly sent to the interior of Anatolia, where most of them died.

==== Alleged role in the burning of Smyrna ====
The question of who was responsible for starting the burning of Smyrna continues to be debated, with Turkish sources mostly attributing responsibility to Greeks or Armenians, and vice versa. Other sources, on the other hand, suggest that at the very least, Turkish inactivity played a significant part on the event.

The majority of non-Turkish researchers agree that the fire was caused by Turkish soldiers in order to completely eradicate the Christian presence in Anatolia.

== War crimes against Turkish Kurds ==
=== Early repressions of Kurds (1916–1934) ===
The policy of deporting Ottoman Kurds from their indigenous lands began during World War I under the orders of Talaat Pasha, and continued after the founding of the Republic of Turkey. Although many Kurds were loyal to the empire (with some even supporting the persecution of Christian minorities by the CUP), Turkish authorities nevertheless feared the possibility that they would collaborate with Armenians and Russians to establish their own Kurdish state. In 1916, roughly 300,000 Kurds were deported from Bitlis, Erzurum, Palu and Muş to Konya and Gaziantep during the winter, and most died in a famine.

The official policy of the newly-founded Turkey was to dismantle traditional Kurdish Islamic tribal society and institutions, as well as to continue with the CUP's repressive and assimilationist policies. Consequently, the Kurds began to mobilize for a resistance, culminating with the Sheikh Said rebellion in 1925; in response, the government mobilized half of the Turkish Army and conducted an aerial bombing campaign against the Kurds. The rebellion was ultimately crushed and Sheikh Said executed. Later that year, the government initiated a pogrom in Diyarbakir, executing civilians and burning villages to the ground, which in total destroyed about 206 villages and killed 15,200 people. By late 1925, a new deportation law was implemented and the Kurdish elite – numbering about 500 – were deported to western Turkey.

==== Zilan massacre ====
In mid-1930, during the Ararat rebellion, the Turkish Armed Forces committed large-scale massacres against Kurdish villages in Ağrı Province that showed support for the rebels, killing between 4,500 to 15,000 people, many of them civilians. According to Cumhuriyet, the massacres left the Zilan River full of corpses, and villages on the outskirts of Mount Ararat were burned to the ground. The British Foreign Office argued "that the Turkish 'success' near Ergish and Zilan [was, in reality,] gained over a few armed men and a large percentage of non-combatants."

=== Massacres in the Dersim region ===
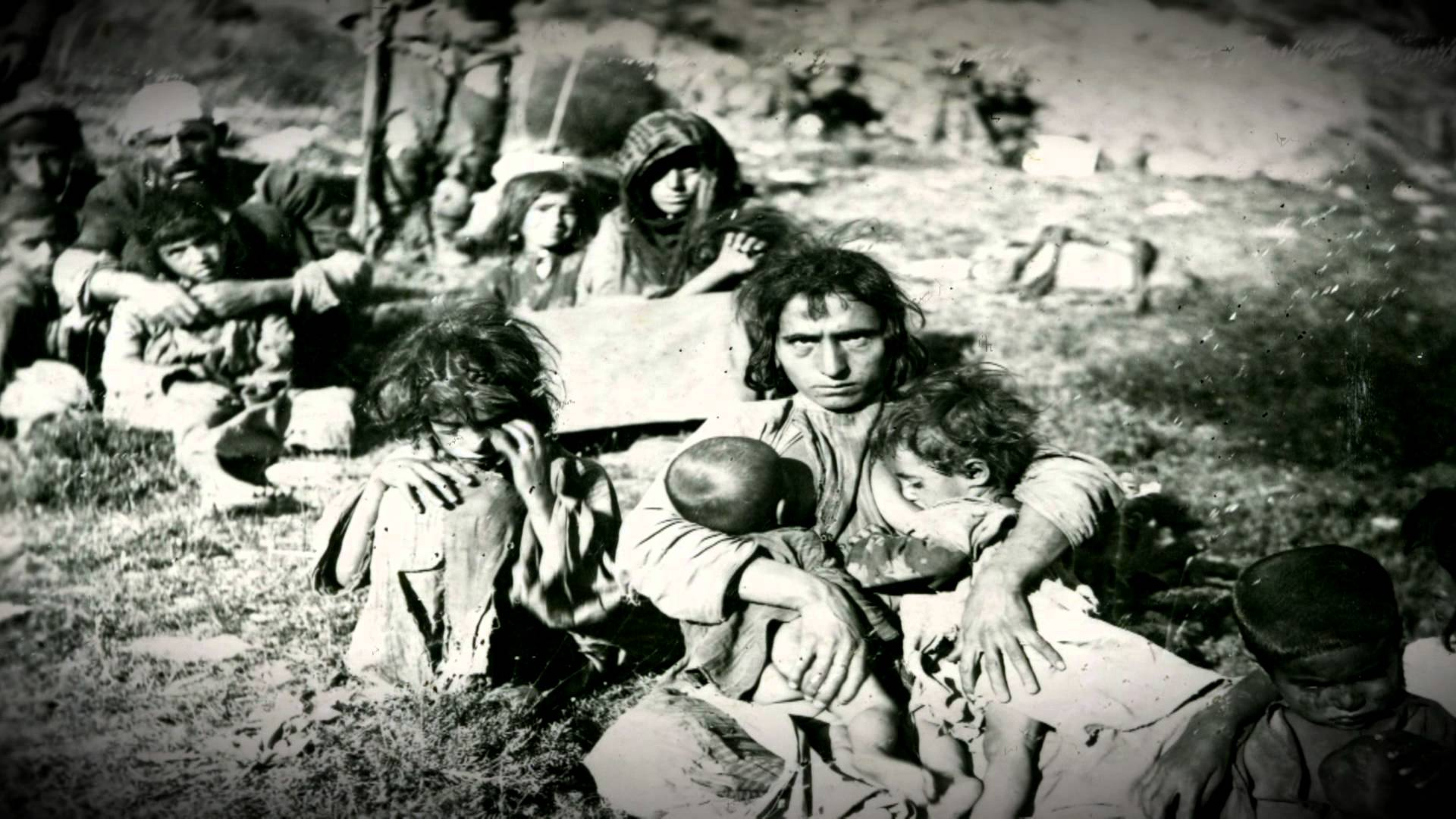
Women and children from Dersim, displaced after the Turkish Army destroyed their homes (1938)

In response to a rebellion in the Dersim region, Turkish forces launched military operations in 1937 and 1938 that devastated the region, massacring between 13,000 to 40,000 people, and forcibly deporting 3,000 more.

On 23 November 2011, Prime Minister Recep Tayyip Erdoğan apologized "on behalf of the state" over the killing of over 13,000 people during the rebellion. He described the massacre as "one of the most tragic events of our recent history" saying that, while some sought to justify it as a legitimate response to events on the ground, it was in reality "an operation which was planned step by step".

=== Crimes during the Kurdistan Workers' Party insurgency ===
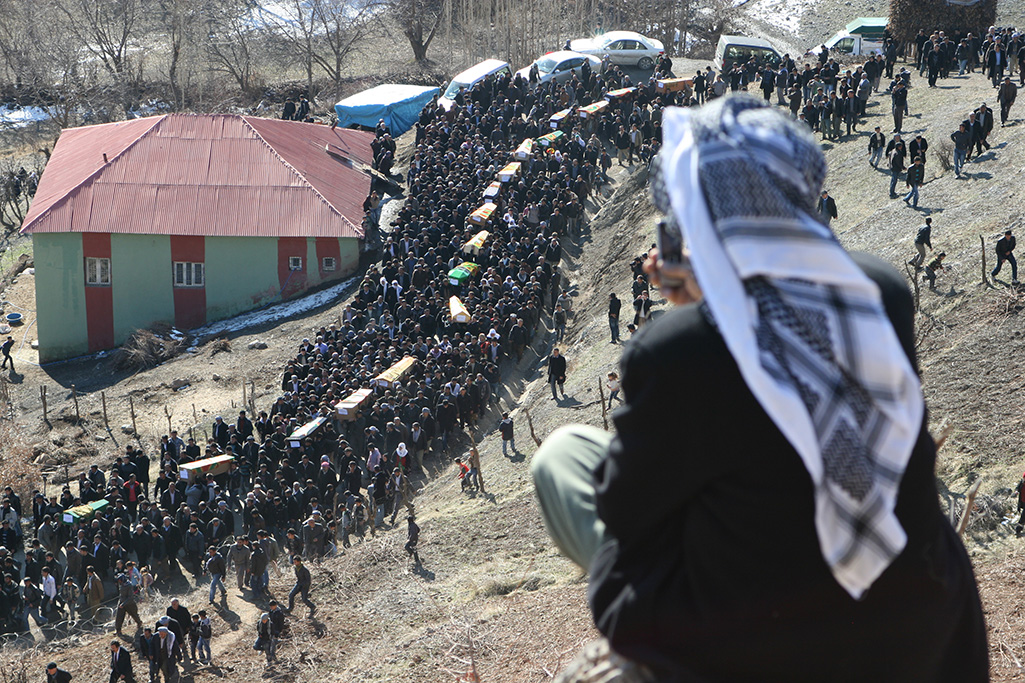
Funeral procession for the victims of the Roboski massacre, 2011

Since the 1970s, the European Court of Human Rights has condemned Turkey for thousands of human rights abuses against Kurdish people. The judgments are related to systematic executions of Kurdish civilians, forced recruitments, torturing, forced displacements, thousands of destroyed villages, arbitrary arrests, and murdered or disappeared Kurdish journalists. According to David L. Philips, more than 1,500 people affiliated with the Kurdish opposition parties and organizations were murdered by unidentified assailants between 1986 and 1996. Government-backed mercenaries assassinated hundreds of suspected Kurdistan Workers' Party (PKK) sympathizers. The Turkish government is held responsible by Turkish human rights organizations for at least 3,438 civilian deaths in the conflict between 1987 and 2000.

At the beginning of the conflict, the PKK's relationship with its civilian supporters created incentives for the Turkish government to use terrorism against Kurdish citizens in the Kurdish dominated southeast region of Turkey. Since the early 1980s, the authorities have systematically used arbitrary arrests, executions of suspects, excessive force, and torture to suppress opposition. In 1995, Human Rights Watch (HRW) reported that it was common practice for Turkish soldiers to kill Kurdish civilians and take pictures of their corpses with weapons they carried only for staging the events. Killed civilians were shown to press as PKK "terrorists".

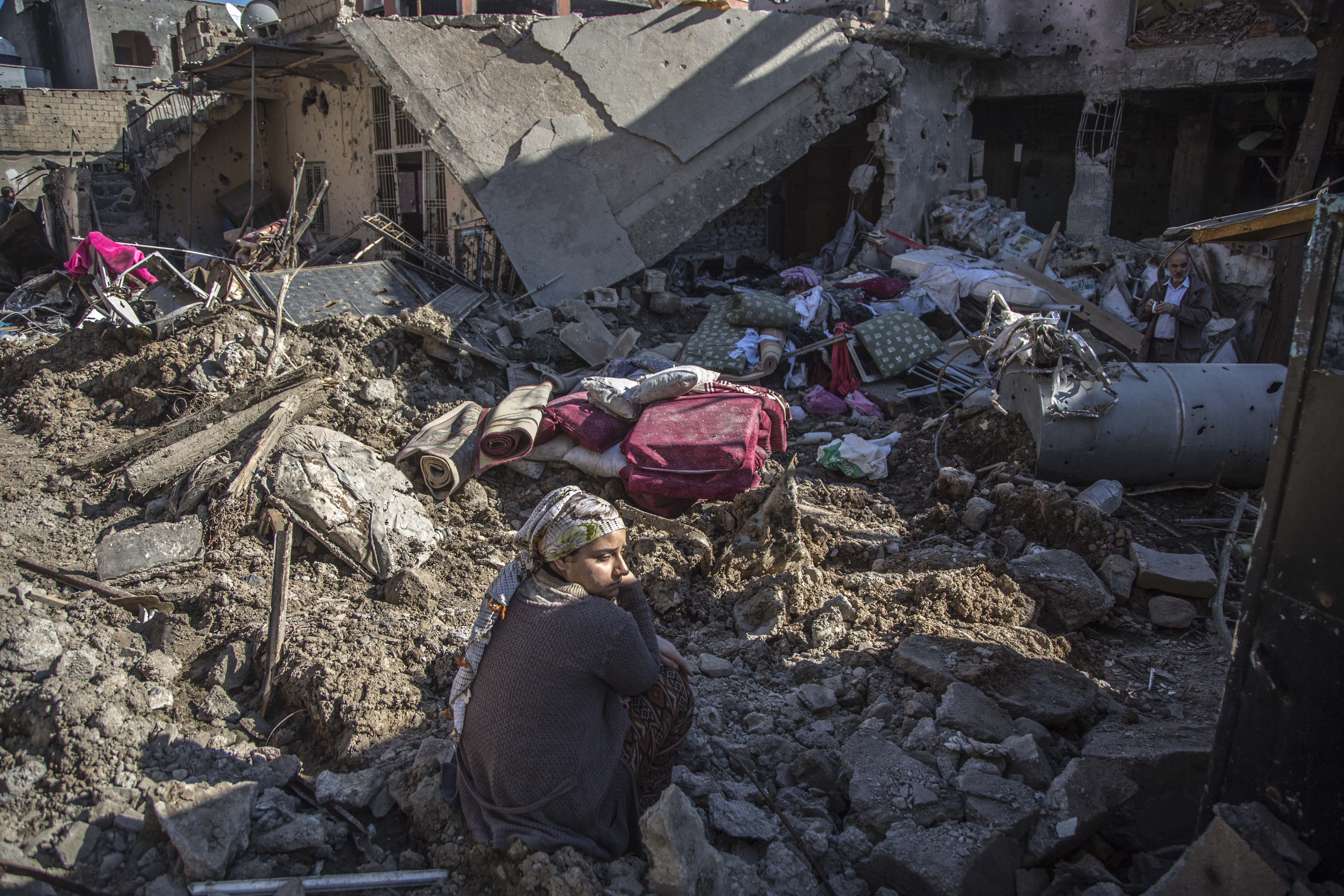
House destroyed during clashes in Şırnak Province, March 2016

In January 2016, during a period of escalation in the conflict, more than 1,000 scholars and academics (from 90 Turkish Universities and abroad) signed a petition entitled "We will be not a party to this crime!", calling for an end to the government's attacks on Kurdish-majority areas of the country (describing it as a "deliberate massacre"), as well as a resumption of the peace process.

==== Imprisonment, torture and enforced disappearances of Kurds ====
Since the 1990s, Turkish security services had resorted to enforced disappearances, wherein Kurds would be detained and never seen again, with only eyewitnesses coming forward to tell the story. In 1997, Amnesty International reported that disappearances and extrajudicial executions had emerged as new and disturbing patterns of human rights violations by the Turkish state. According to the Human Rights Association (İHD), there were 940 cases of enforced disappearance since the 1990s. In addition to that, more than 3,248 people who were murdered in extrajudicial killings are believed to have been buried in 253 separate burial places. On 6 January 2011, the bodies of 12 people were found in a mass grave near an old police station in Mutki, Bitlis. A few months later, three other mass graves were reportedly found in the garden of Çemişgezek police station.

In 2017, the Stockholm Center for Freedom (SCF) documented eleven cases since 2016 in which people have been abducted by men identifying themselves as police officers, then forced into transit vans. Family members were unable to find out their locations from the state, indicating that they were detained secretly or by clandestine groups. In a case where one was finally located after 42 days missing, he was tortured for days, forced to sign a confession and handed over to police.

Human Rights Watch and Amnesty both released reports of widespread torture and rape of prisoners in Turkey spanning multiple decades, with Kurdish women – particularly those accused of helping the PKK – being frequent targets of sexual violence.

==== Depopulation of Kurdish villages in Turkey ====
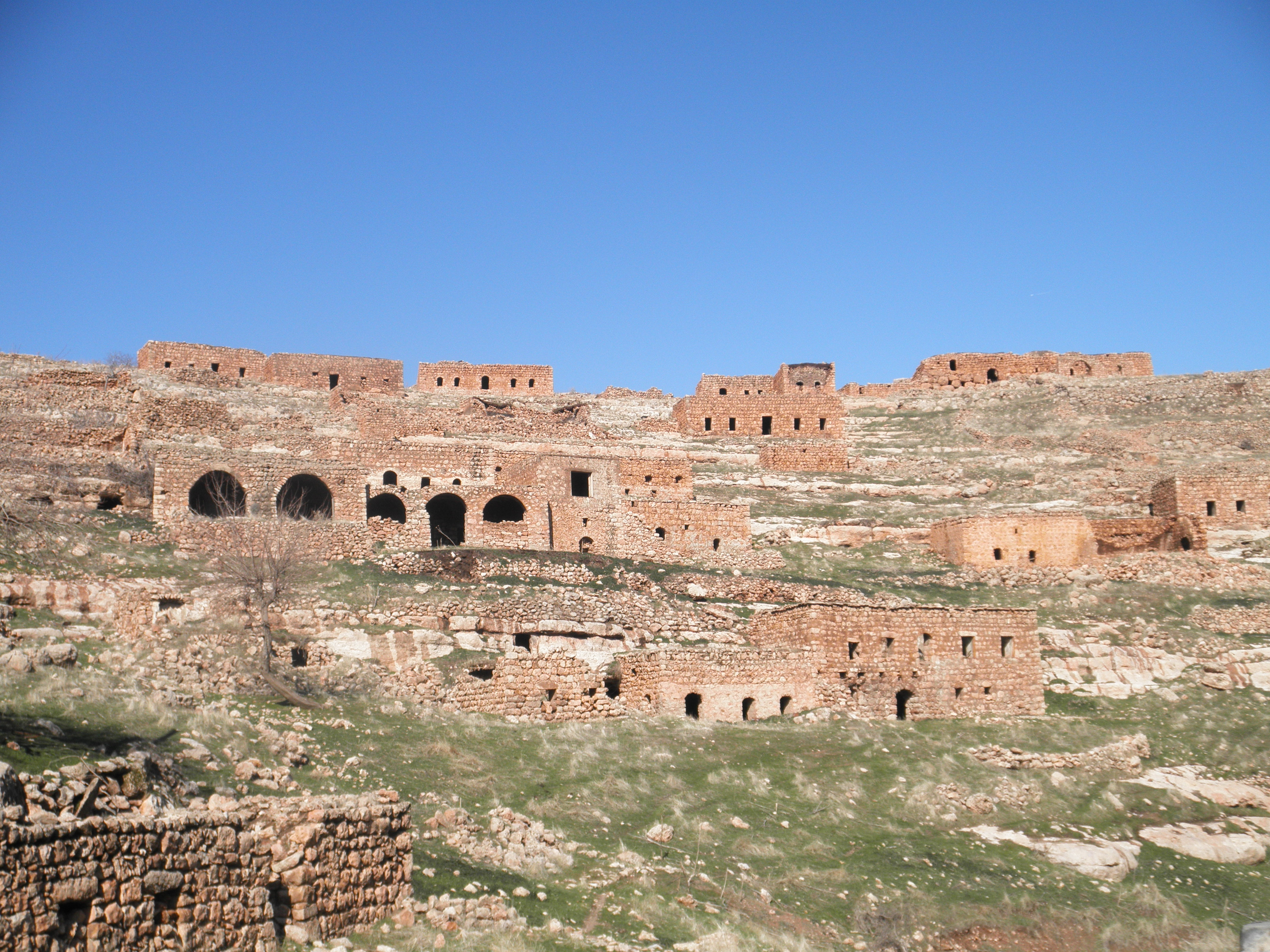
A previously depopulated Kurdish village; Ulaş, Dargeçit

Until the 1970s, about 70% of the Kurdish population of Turkish Kurdistan, inhabited one of the approximately 20,000 Kurdish villages. But by 1985, only 58% of the population were still living in the rural areas; much of the countryside in Kurdish populated regions had been depopulated by the Turkish government, with Kurdish civilians moving to in Diyarbakır, Van and Şırnak, as well as to the cities of western Turkey. The causes of the depopulation were, in most cases, the Turkish state's military operations, and to a lesser extent, attacks by the PKK on villages it believed to be collaborating with the government. Human Rights Watch documented many instances where the Turkish military forcibly evacuated villages, destroying houses and equipment to prevent the return of the inhabitants. An estimated 3,000 Kurdish villages in Southeast Anatolia were virtually wiped from the map, representing the displacement of more than 378,000 people by 2005. During the 1990s, the Turkish military reportedly deployed Sikorsky and Cobra helicopters to drive out the Kurdish population from the villages.

In November 1992, Turkish authorities demanded the Muhtar of the Kelekçi village to evacuate all their inhabitants. But as the villagers gathered in an area, the Turkish gendarmerie (using heavy weapons in armored vehicles) began firing at the villagers and their houses. Soldiers set fire to and destroyed 136 houses. Some of the villagers escaped to nearby towns. On the 6 April 1993, the Turkish authorities returned and set fire to the remaining houses. Before its destruction, the village had a population of 500 inhabitants. Similarly, in March 1994, 38 Kurds were killed and their villages of Koçağılı and Kuşkonar were destroyed as a result of a bombing campaign by the Turkish Armed Forces.

==== Collective punishment of Kurdish people ====
On 21 January 2016, a report published by Amnesty International stated that more than 150 civilians had been killed in Cizre. They reported that curfews had been imposed in more than 19 different towns and districts, putting the lives of hundreds of thousands of people at risk. Additionally, the report stated that the government's disproportionate restrictions on movement and other arbitrary measures were resembling collective punishment, a war crime under the 1949 Geneva Conventions.

== Turkish invasion of Cyprus ==
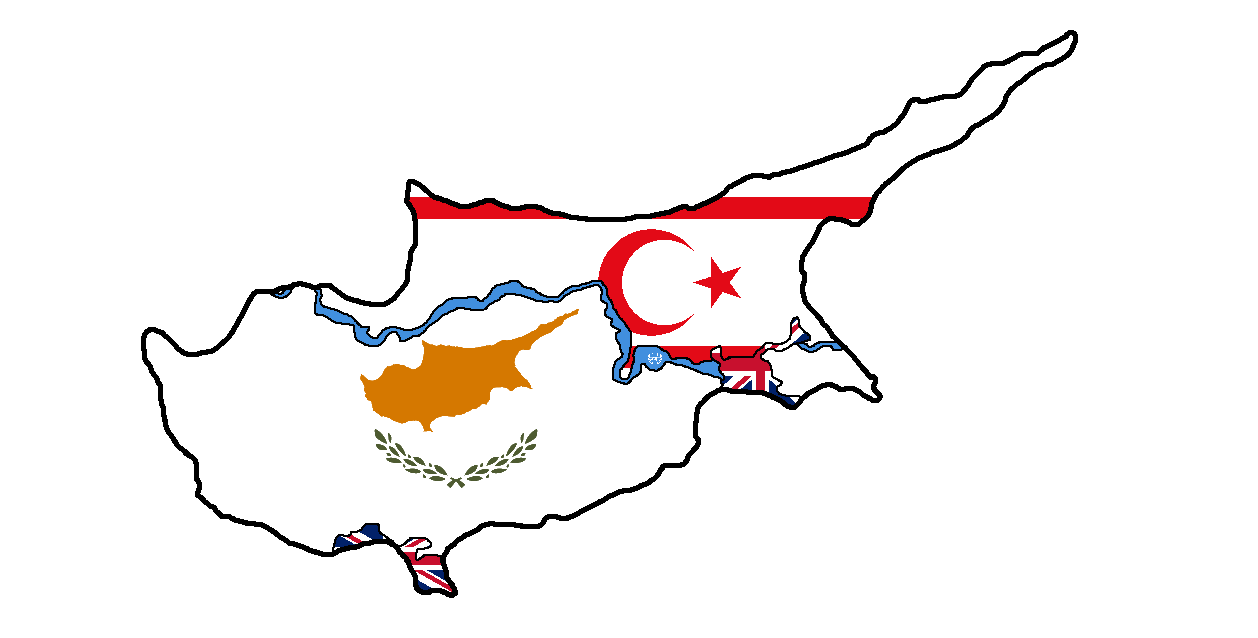
De facto division of Cyprus since 1974

Turkey was found guilty by the European Commission of Human Rights for displacement of persons, deprivation of liberty, ill treatment, deprivation of life and deprivation of possessions during their invasion of Cyprus. The Turkish policy of violently forcing a third of the island's Greek population from their homes in the occupied North, preventing their return, and settling Turks from mainland Turkey is considered an example of ethnic cleansing.

In 1976, and again in 1983, the European Commission of Human Rights found Turkey guilty of repeated violations of the European Convention of Human Rights. Turkey has been condemned for preventing the return of Greek Cypriot refugees to their properties. The European Commission of Human Rights reports of 1976 and 1983 states that:

Having found violations of a number of Articles of the Convention, the Commission notes that the acts violating the Convention were exclusively directed against members of one of two communities in Cyprus, namely the Greek Cypriot community. It concludes by eleven votes to three that Turkey has thus failed to secure the rights and freedoms set forth in these Articles without discrimination on the grounds of ethnic origin, race, religion as required by Article 14 of the Convention.

Enclaved Greek Cypriots in the Karpass Peninsula in 1975 were subjected by the Turks to violations of their human rights so that by 2001 when the European Court of Human Rights found Turkey guilty of the violation of 14 articles of the European Convention of Human Rights in its judgement of Cyprus v Turkey (application no. 25781/94), less than 600 still remained. In the same judgement, Turkey was found guilty of violating the rights of the Turkish Cypriots by authorising the trial of civilians by a military court.

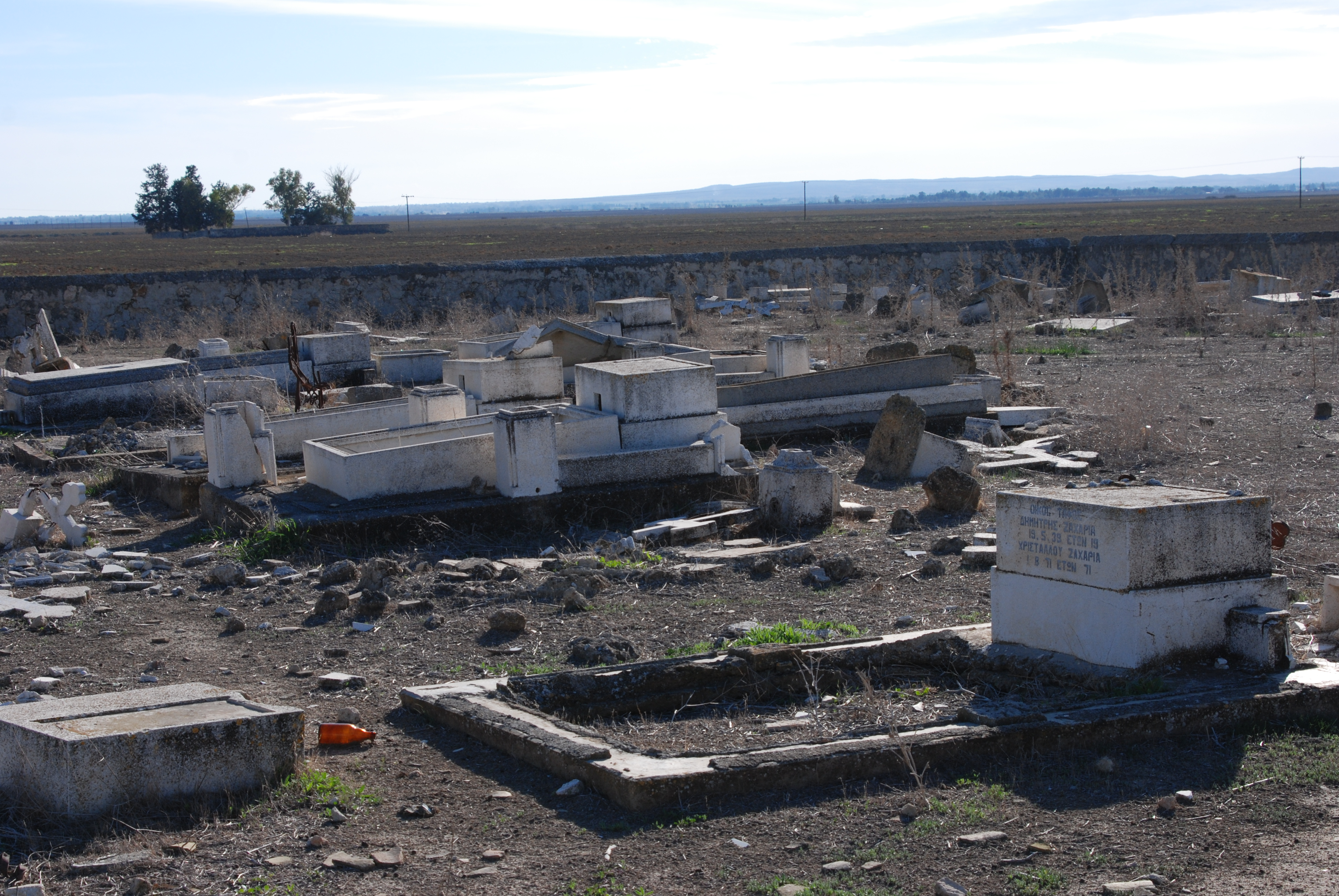
Looted and desecrated Greek cemetery in Northern Cyprus, 2008

As a result of the invasion, over 2000 Greek-Cypriot prisoners of war were taken to Turkey and detained in Turkish prisons. Some of them were not released and are still missing. In particular, the Committee on Missing Persons (CMP) in Cyprus, which operates under the auspices of the United Nations, is mandated to investigate approximately 1600 cases of Greek Cypriot and Greek missing persons.

=== Rape and torture during the invasion of Cyprus ===
The European commission of Human Rights, with 12 votes against 1, accepted evidence from the Republic of Cyprus concerning the rapes of various Greek-Cypriot women by Turkish soldiers and the torture of many Greek-Cypriot prisoners during the invasion of the island. The high rate of rape reportedly resulted in the temporary permission of abortion in Cyprus by the conservative Cypriot Orthodox Church. According to Paul Sant Cassia, rape was used systematically to "soften" resistance and clear civilian areas through fear. Many of the atrocities were seen as revenge for the atrocities against Turkish Cypriots in 1963–64 and the massacres during the first invasion. It has been suggested that many of the atrocities were revenge killings, committed by Turkish Cypriot fighters in military uniform who might have been mistaken for Turkish soldiers. In the Karpass Peninsula, a group of Turkish Cypriots reportedly chose young girls to rape and impregnated teenage girls. There were cases of rapes, which included gang rapes, of teenage girls by Turkish soldiers and Turkish Cypriot men in the peninsula, and one case involved the rape of an old Greek Cypriot man by a Turkish Cypriot. The man was reportedly identified by the victim and two other rapists were also arrested. Raped women were sometimes outcast from society.

=== Legality of the invasion ===
Article Four of the Treaty of Guarantee gives the right to guarantors of Cyprus (Turkey, Greece, and the United Kingdom) to take action with the sole aim of re-establishing the state of affairs. Turkey intervened after Greece's military junta tried to create a union with Cyprus by force, and the Council of Europe supported the legality of the first wave of the Turkish invasion that occurred in July 1974. However, the United Nations Security Council challenged the legality of Turkey's actions after this point, as the aftermath of the invasion did not safeguard the Republic's sovereignty and territorial integrity, but had the opposite effect: the de facto partition of the Republic and the creation of a separate political entity in the north. On 13 February 1975, Turkey declared the occupied areas of the Republic of Cyprus to be a "Federated Turkish State", to the widespread condemnation of international observers.

== Syrian civil war ==
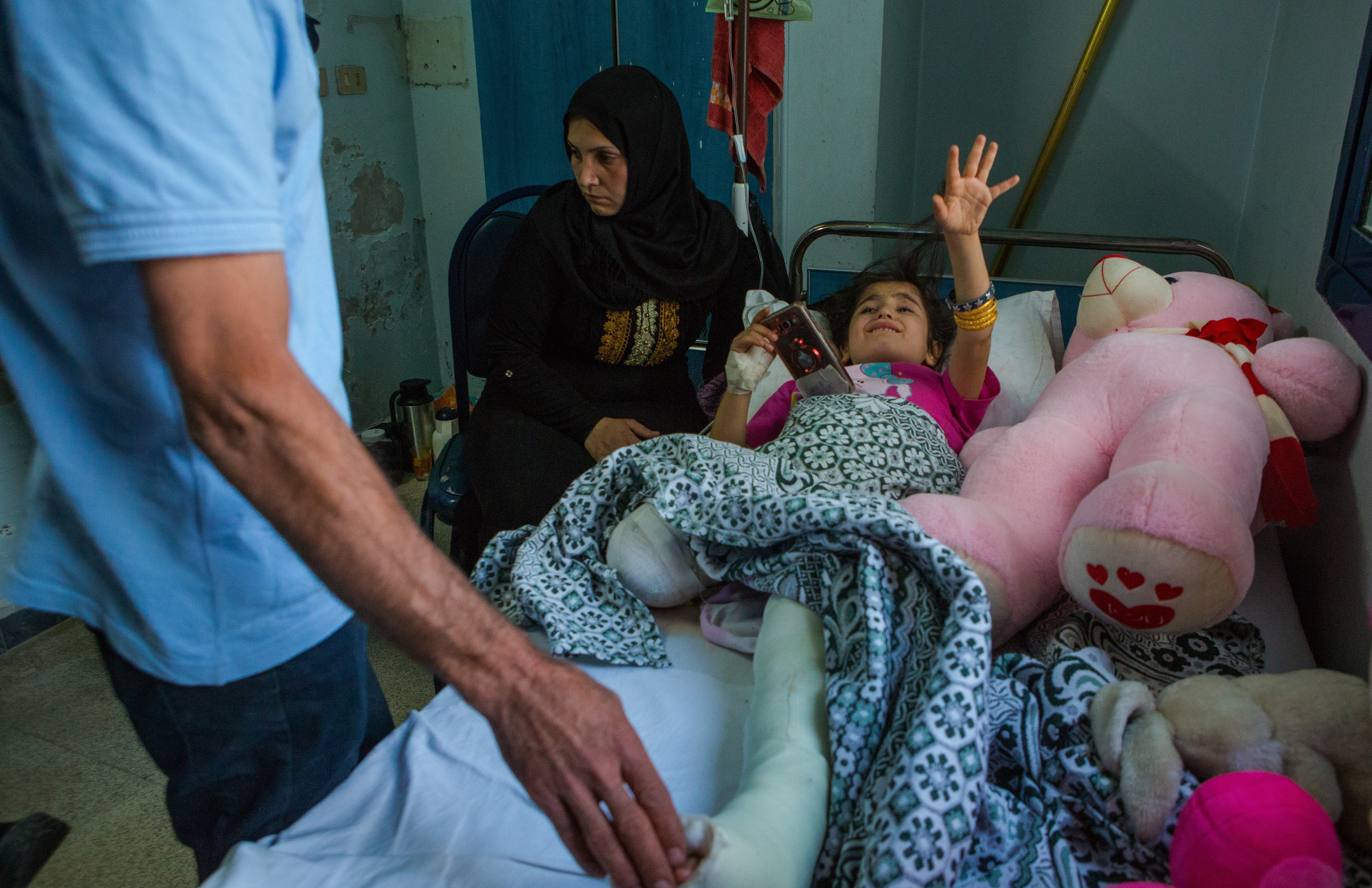
A child left disabled by Turkish airstrikes on Qamishli, 2019

The 2021 and 2022 Country Reports on Human Rights Practices stated that Turkish-affiliated groups had committed human rights abuses in Syria; this includes killings, torture, sexual violence, enforced demographic changes targeting Syrian Kurds, recruitment of child soldiers, and the looting and desecration of religious sites.

The UN Commission of Inquiry for Syria, the Office of the United Nations High Commissioner for Human Rights (OHCHR), and human rights organisations reported that groups supported by Turkey have tortured and killed civilians. The Syrian National Army (SNA) justice system and detention network is under the command of the Turkish forces, and the UN commission reported on the presence of Turkish officials in interrogation sessions where torture was used. The Turkish supported Sultan Murad Division and Ahrar al-Sharqiya has also been accused of war crimes.

In March 2020, a UN report accused rebels allied to Turkey for abuses on Kurdish-held areas during an assault, and said if the rebels were acting under the control of Turkish forces, the Turkish commanders may be liable for war crimes. In addition, it called on Turkey to investigate whether it was responsible for an air raid on a civilian convoy near Ras al-Ayn. Turkey denied a role in the attack, while the Syrian Observatory for Human Rights (SOHR) said that it was conducted by Turkish aircraft. In September 2020, United Nations asked Turkey to investigate possible war crimes and other human rights violations carried out by Turkish-affiliated groups in the area that Turkey controls in Syria. Turkey accused the UN Human Rights Office of baseless claims and "undue criticism". The OHCHR said that in the areas controlled by Turkey the number of crimes against civilians have been increased.

=== Indiscriminate attacks in Syria ===
==== Operation Olive Branch ====
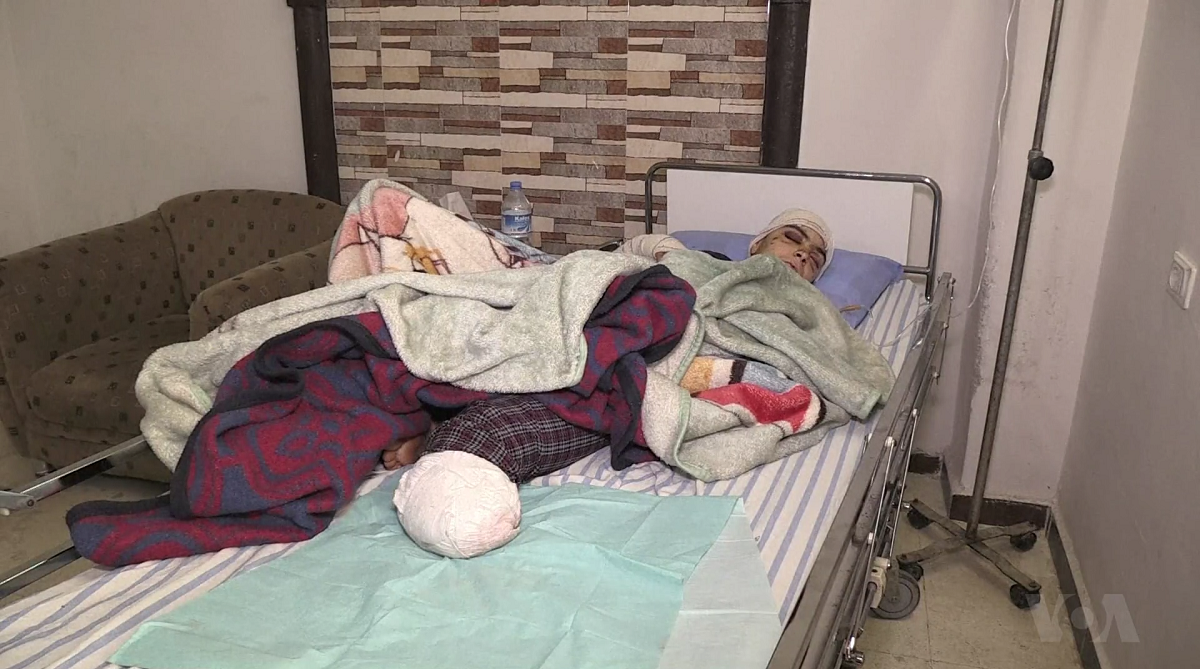
A civilian wounded by Turkish airstrikes on Afrin, 2018

Less than a week after Turkey launched Operation Olive Branch in 2018, Redur Xelil, a senior Syrian Democratic Forces (SDF) official, said that at least 66 civilians were killed by aerial and artillery bombardment from Turkish forces, and accused Turkey of committing war crimes. Amnesty International reported that civilians were being killed by the Turkish Army due to indiscriminate shelling of civilian areas, an act that is in violation of international law. According to Amnesty, the situation "painted a grim picture" throughout numerous villages in Afrin, within which civilians were subjected to indiscriminate shelling that lasted for hours. They stated: "The use of artillery and other imprecise explosive weapons in civilian areas is prohibited by international humanitarian law and all parties should cease such attacks immediately." Human Rights Watch stated that Turkish border guards indiscriminately shot at refugees and asylum seekers attempting to flee the conflict zone into Turkey.

On 22 February 2018, Syrian government news outlets stated that Turkey was bombing humanitarian aid convoys that were on their way to Afrin. As a result, the Syrian Arab Red Crescent stated that they had suspended all aid convoys to Afrin because it was unsafe for them to head there. On the same day, a video surfaced that showed Turkish backed rebels executing a civilian driving a farm tractor. This was followed by another video by the same group that showed a summary execution of 6 civilians, including one woman near Jendires. In another bombing in the same area, Kurdish militia claimed that Turkish air strikes had killed 13 civilians, including several children.

==== 2019 offensive into north-eastern Syria ====
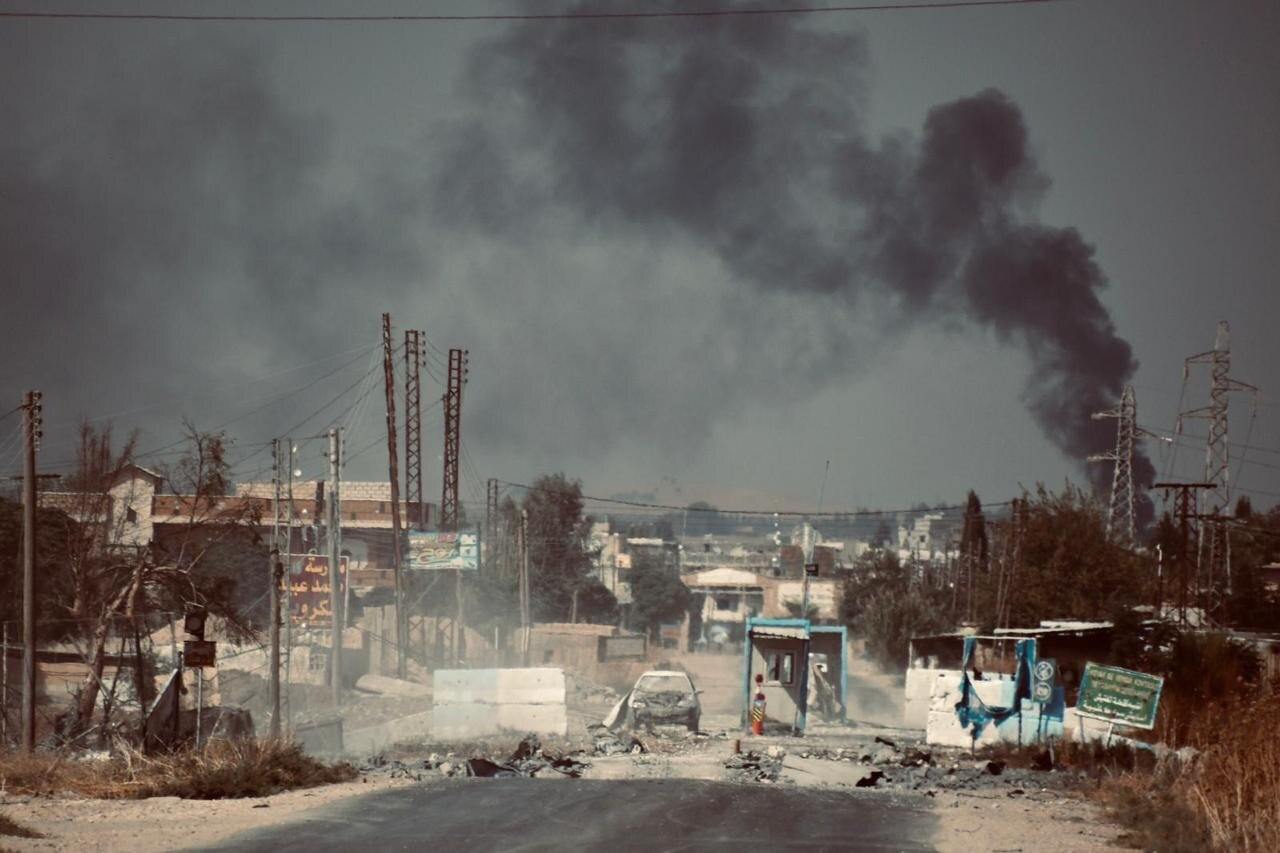
A checkpoint near Ras al-Ayn, abandoned by the Syrian Democratic Forces after the 2019 Turkish offensive into Syria.

In an October 2019 report by Amnesty International, they accused Turkey and its allies of perpetrating war crimes. Kumi Naidoo said that the Turkish military and their allies do not care about civilian lives, and the United States special envoy for Syria said that they had seen evidence of war crimes during Turkey's offensive against the Kurds in Syria, and had demanded an explanation from Turkey. U.S. officials were investigating a report that the restricted burning white phosphorus had been used during the Turkish offensive. Turkish officials denied that war crimes were committed. The United States Secretary of Defense, Mark Esper, said in an interview that Turkey "appears to be" committing war crimes in Syria, adding that there was footage showing the execution of Kurdish captives.

The International Bar Association condemned the assaults against Syrian Kurds by Turkish forces in northern Syria, and called on Turkey to halt the attacks and respect the civilians as it is obligated by international laws, after the reports of Turkish-backed militias executing civilians. Furthermore, the same month during the hearing of the US Committee on Foreign Relations when Senator Cardin asked the ambassador Jeffrey if he is aware of reports of the United Nations and other groups about war crimes which have been committed by the Turkish forces in their invasion into Syria, the ambassador said:

We have seen some preliminary concerns. We have not seen any detailed reporting. The detailed reporting, of course—and there are volumes of it—is on the Assad regime's actions throughout Syria. But we are very, very concerned about what we and all of us have seen on video footage and some of the reports that we have received from our SDF colleagues, and we are looking into those as I speak.

When then was asked if he was aware of Turkish war crimes, he stated that "in at least one instance", Turkish-backed Syrian rebels committed war crimes, and that they were "reach[ing] out to Turkey to demand an explanation." In addition, U.S. drones appeared to show Turkish-backed forces targeting civilians during their assault on Kurdish areas in Syria, these actions reported as possible war crimes.

==== 2024–2025 offensive into northern Syria ====
Turkey was accused of systematically targeting critical and medical infrastructure during its 2024–2025 offensive in northern Syria. Turkish drone strikes on the Tishrin Dam left 413,000 Syrian Kurds without clean water or electricity. Turkish drones also targeted several power stations and water stations, leaving a majority of residents of North and East Syria without access to clean water or electricity. Turkish drones strikes destroyed 4 ambulances and killed 3 paramedics. Human Rights Watch accused Turkey of war crimes after a Turkish drone struck an ambulance during a protest against the bombardment of the Tishrin Dam. Additionally, 9 health facilities were looted and 4 healthcare staff killed by the Turkish-backed Syrian National Army (SNA) in the aftermath of the Manbij offensive.

==== Targeting of journalists and politicians ====
Serena Shim, a journalist of Press TV, was killed at a car crash with a heavy vehicle in Turkey in what are said, by her employer and her parents, to be suspicious circumstances. The car crash happened just days after she said that the Turkey's state intelligence agency, MIT, had threatened her and said she was spying, due to some of the stories she had covered about Turkey's stance on ISIL militants in Kobane. She also said that she had received images of ISIL militants crossing the Turkish border into Syria in World Food Organization and other NGOs trucks.

Turkish journalist Arzu Yildiz was sentenced to 20 months in jail and lost her parental rights after showing a video related to a weapons-smuggling scandal denied by the Turkish government, in what her lawyer said was "an act of revenge" by Recep Tayyip Erdogan.

On 12 October 2019, the Turkish-backed Ahrar al-Sharqiya murdered the Kurdish-Syrian politician Hevrin Khalaf.

Three Kurdish journalists were killed in Turkish drone strikes during the 2024 offensive in northern Syria, and an additional 8 were left injured.

=== Demographic engineering and ethnic cleansing ===
Timeline of the 2018 Afrin offensive

The SOHR estimated in 2018 that around 300,000 Kurdish people were displaced by the Afrin offensive. In the aftermath of the operation, Turkish forces implemented a resettlement policy by moving refugees from Eastern Ghouta into the newly-empty homes. Many houses, farms, and other private property belonging to those that fled were seized or looted by Turkish-backed rebels. In a study of 24 key informants from Afrin, all reported loss of housing, land or property following Operation Olive Branch. This led to accusations, by both activists and former residents, that Turkey was engaging in demographic engineering or ethnic cleansing in Afrin.

In late 2019, Turkey conducted an offensive into the northeast of Syria with the stated goal of expelling the SDF (claiming they had ties to the PKK) and resettling millions of Syrian refugees. While Turkey claimed to be acting in self-defence, law professor Adil Ahmad Haque said that the operation itself violated UN preemptory norms against crimes of aggression, and therefore could not be justified be using self-defence arguments. Similar to Afrin, the operation displaced roughly 300,000 Syrian Kurds; this, combined with the resettlement plan, was further criticized as an attempt at demographic engineering.

The US State Department spokeswoman Morgan Ortagus told CNN, in reference to the 2019 offensive, that they "had serious concerns regarding reports that the Turkish-Supported Opposition may have engaged in […] the killing of unarmed civilians and prisoners and reports of ethnic cleansing".

=== Sexual violence in Turkish-occupied Syria ===
The Independent International Commission of Inquiry on the Syrian Arab Republic has reported repeated instances of Kurdish women and girls being subjected to rape and other forms of sexual violence by the Turkish-backed SNA. in February 2020 alone, 30 Kurdish women were reported to have been raped by SNA members, frequently occurring during house raids. In 2022, a Kurdish woman trying to travel to Turkey was gang-raped in SNA-controlled territory; one of the alleged rapists was an SNA fighter.

Sexual violence was also used as a form of torture in prisons run by Turkish-backed rebels, with incidents of prison rape being documented in Afrin since at least 2018. Men, women and children who were detained by the SNA became victims of sexual violence. In one instance, a minor was gang-raped by the prison guards in Afrin, who forced male detainees to watch it happen while subjecting them to physical violence.

=== Desecration of corpses ===
Multiple videos emerged during Operation Olive Branch that showed what appeared to be Turkish-backed Syrian rebels mutilating the corpses of dead People's Defense Units (YPG) militants. One video showed the body of a dead female YPG fighter with her breasts cut off. SNA fighters who appear in the video call the female fighter a "female pig" and are heard saying "shame on them for sending women to fight". They are shown in the film stepping on her breasts.

In November 2019, Turkish-backed forces were accused of committing war crimes after mobile phone footage surfaced showing them desecrating the bodies of dead Kurdish fighters. The UN warned that Turkey could be held responsible for the actions of its allies, while Turkey promised to investigate. U.S. officials said that some of the actions in these videos probably constitute war crimes.

=== Antiquities smuggling ===
In 2015, Syria's antiquities chief has said Turkey was refusing to return looted objects from ancient heritage sites in Syria or to provide information about them. Turkey is also said to let ISIL smuggles Syrian antiquities through it. In an official letter to UN, the Russian envoy Vitaly Churkin stated that antiquities from Syria and Iraq are exported to Turkey. The main center for the smuggling of cultural heritage items is the Turkish city of Gaziantep, where the stolen goods are sold at illegal auctions. According to the envoy, new smuggling hubs are popping up on the Turkish-Syrian border, with the "bulky goods" being delivered by the Turkish transport companies. Smuggled artifacts then arrive in the Turkish cities of Izmir, Mersin and Antalya, where representatives of international criminal groups produce fake documents on the origin of the antiquities. Turkey responded that she will investigate the claims but believes that the accusations are politically motivated.

Later on, reports emerged in 2019 that following the Operation Olive Branch, more than 16,000 artifacts such as glass, pottery and mosaics mostly from Afrin District, were looted and smuggled to Turkey by Syrian rebels.

In 2022, the Russian Defence Ministry claimed that Turkish-backed forces illegally do excavations in northern Syria. They are using explosives and heavy equipments which destroy the ancient sites. Many also accused Turkey of turning a blind eye in these activities. Turkey in response, according to the Turkish defence, interior and culture and tourism ministries, deployed Turkish soldiers in some of the ancient sites in Syria and started operation to retrieve Syrian smuggled items in Turkey.

=== Disruption of water supplies ===
In March 2020, nongovernmental organizations, the World Health Organization and the Kurdish-led administration in northeast Syria said that the water supply from the Alouk pumping station has been repeatedly interrupted after Turkey and its allies took control of the Allouk water station after the Turkish offensive in October 2019. Turkey carried out more than 100 attacks between October 2019 and January 2024 on oil fields, gas facilities and power stations in the Kurdish-held Autonomous Administration of North and East Syria (AANES). In addition, local authorities and humanitarian groups in Northeast Syria said that they are unable to bring additional supplies into the region because the border with the Kurdistan Region of Iraq is closed. They all warned that doing these in the midst of the COVID-19 pandemic is very dangerous.

=== Alleged Turkish complicity and cooperation with the Islamic State ===
Since mid-2014, both the PKK and international media have accused Turkey of supporting and collaborating with the Islamic State (IS), a Sunni Islamist terrorist group known for committing numerous crimes against humanity. Several of the allegation have focused on Turkish businessman and politician Burhanettin Çelikçi, who has faced calls for his prosecution in the United States. When the Islamic State kidnapped 49 Turkish diplomats from Mosul in June 2014, a columnist said that Turkey was now "paying the price of its collaboration with terrorists", in reference to the Islamist factions in the Syrian National Army.

Some news websites also criticised Turkey for "doing nothing" against the Islamic State. American website Al-Monitor stated in June 2014 that Turkey, by "ignoring its own border security", had allowed its border with Syria to become a "jihadist highway" for the Islamic State to let thousands of international jihadists, and other supplies, be smuggled to them in Syria. British newspaper The Guardian stated that Turkey had spent months "[doing] little to stop foreign recruits crossing its border to ISIS". In April 2018, Foreign Policy stated that in 2013 alone, some 30,000 militants illegally crossed into Turkish land, as the Syria–Turkey border was popular among foreign volunteers illegally crossing it to join the Islamic State in Syria. Furthermore, it was claimed that wounded Islamic State militants were treated in private-owned hospitals across southeastern Turkey. Among those receiving care was one of the top deputies of Islamic State chieftain Abu Bakr al-Baghdadi, Ahmet el-H, who was treated in a private hospital in Sanliurfa in August 2014.

==== Islamic State's attacks on Kobanî ====
On 25 June 2015, Islamic State fighters detonated three car bombs in Kobanî, close to the Turkish border crossing. The IS fighters were reported to have disguised themselves as Kurdish security forces, before entering the town and shooting civilians with assault rifles and RPGs. IS also committed a massacre in the village of Barkh Butan, about 20 kilometres south of Kobanî, executing at least 26 Syrian Kurds, among them women and children. Kurdish rebel forces and the Syrian government claimed the vehicles had entered the city from across the international border. The pro-Kurdish Peoples' Democratic Party in Turkey argued that the Turkish government under Erdoğan supported the Islamic State, and that the Kobanî massacre was "a part of this support", a claim that Erdoğan himself rejected.

== Child soldiers in Syria and Libya ==
The Turkish government linked think tank SETA withdrew a report detailing the composition of the Syrian National Army as it revealed the use of child soldiers. In addition, according to a report by Al-Monitor, citing sources on the ground, Turkey has deployed to Libya child soldiers from Syria. Of the 18,000 Syrian fighters Turkey sent to Libya in September 2020, 350 were children; 34 of the 471 fighters killed by August that year were also children.

In July 2021, the United States of America added Turkey to the list of countries that implicated in the use of child soldiers, because it used them in Syria and Libya. The 2021 and 2022 Country Reports on Human Rights Practices also mentioned the recruitment of child soldiers from Turkish-supported forces. Trafficking in Persons Reports mentioned that Turkey provided support (operational, equipment and financial) to armed groups in Syria which recruit and use child soldiers.

== See also ==
- The Twenty Classes
- Aşkale labor camp
- Diyarbakır Prison
- List of massacres in Turkey
