= Gölbaşı =

Gölbaşı (literally "head of the lake") is a Turkish place name that may refer to these places:

- Gölbaşı, Adıyaman, town and district of Adıyaman Province in Turkey
- Gölbaşı, Ankara, town and district of Ankara Province in Turkey
- Gölbaşı, Dicle
- Gölbaşı, Kale
- Gölbaşı, Kestel
- Gölbaşı, Seyhan, a village in the district of Seyhan, Adana Province, Turkey
- Gölbaşı, Yeniçağa
- Gölbaşı Lake, Adıyaman, in Gölbaşı, Adıyaman
- Gölbaşı, alternative name of Lake Mogan in Gölbaşı, Ankara
