= Taşağıl, Dicle =

Village in Turkey

Taşağıl
- Neighbourhood
- Location in Turkey
- Coordinates: 38°23′30″N 40°01′49″E
- Country: Turkey
- Province: Diyarbakır
- District: Dicle
- Population (2022): 25
- Time zone: UTC+3 (TRT)

Taşağıl (Kurdish: Xaçekî) is a neighbourhood in the municipality and district of Dicle, Diyarbakır Province in Turkey. It is populated by Kurds and had a population of 25 in 2022.
