= Gelincik =

Gelincik may refer to:

- Gelincik, Dicle, Turkey
- Gelincik, Emirdağ, Turkey
- Gelincik, Mazgirt, Turkey
- Gelincik, İskele, or Vasili, Famagusta, Cyprus
