= Biçer =

Biçer can refer to:

- Biçer, Dicle
- Biçer, Refahiye
- Adil Biçer
