= Yokuşlu =

Yokuşlu may refer to:

- Yokuşlu, Dicle
- Yokuşlu, Yusufeli, a village in Artvin Province, Turkey
- Okay Yokuşlu (born 1994), Turkish professional footballer
