= Döğer =

Döğer can refer to:

- Döğer, Dicle, a village in Dicle district of Diyarbakır Province, Turkey
- Döğer, İhsaniye, a town in İhsaniye district of Afyonkarahisar Province, Turkey
- Döğer (tribe), a tribe of Oghuz Turks
