= Tepebaşı =

Tepebaşı is Turkish word which means "top of the hill" and it may refer to

- Tepebaşı, Dicle
- Tepebaşı, Eskişehir an intracity district of Eskişehir, Turkey
- Tepebaşı, Ermenek a village in Karaman Province
- Tepebaşı, Girne, also known as Diorios, a village in Girne district, Cyprus
- Tepebaşı, Göynük, a village in the District of Göynük, Bolu Province, Turkey
- Tepebaşı, Hasankeyf, a village in the District of Hasankeyf, Batman Province, Turkey
- Tepebaşı, Şavşat, a village in the District of Şavşat, Artvin Province, Turkey
- Tepebaşı, Tercan
