= Bozaba =

Bozaba can refer to:

- Bozaba language
- Bozaba, Dicle
