= Çavlı =

Çavlı may refer to the following villages in Turkey:

- Çavlı, Dicle
- Çavlı, Savaştepe
