= Kurşunlu, Dicle =

Village in Turkey

Kurşunlu
- Neighbourhood
- Location in Turkey
- Coordinates: 38°27′36″N 40°07′01″E
- Country: Turkey
- Province: Diyarbakır
- District: Dicle
- Population (2022): 59
- Time zone: UTC+3 (TRT)

Kurşunlu (Kurdish: Pirejmon) is a neighbourhood in the municipality and district of Dicle, Diyarbakır Province in Turkey. It is populated by Kurds and had a population of 59 in 2022.
