= Kayıköy =

Kayıköy can refer to:

- Kayıköy, Bismil
- Kayıköy, Dicle
- Kayıköy, Refahiye
