= Boğaz =

Boğaz can refer to:

- Boğaz, Dicle, a village in Turkey
- the Turkish name for Bogazi, a village in Cyprus
