= Dedeköy, Dicle =

Village in Turkey

Dedeköy
- Neighbourhood
- Location in Turkey
- Coordinates: 38°19′16″N 40°18′22″E
- Country: Turkey
- Province: Diyarbakır
- District: Dicle
- Population (2022): 1,038
- Time zone: UTC+3 (TRT)

Dedeköy (Kurdish: Şêxsilametan) is a neighbourhood in the municipality and district of Dicle, Diyarbakır Province in Turkey. It is populated by Kurds and had a population of 1,038 in 2022.
