= Pınar, Dicle =

Village in Turkey

Coordinates: 38.4003°N 40.2851°E

Pınar
- Neighbourhood
- Location in Turkey
- Coordinates
- Country: Turkey
- Province: Diyarbakır
- District: Dicle
- Population (2022): 623
- Time zone: UTC+3 (TRT)

Pınar is a neighbourhood in the municipality and district of Dicle, Diyarbakır Province in Turkey. Its population is 623 (2022).
