= Yeşilsırt, Dicle =

Village in Turkey

Yeşilsırt
- Neighbourhood
- Location in Turkey
- Coordinates: 38°21′54″N 40°02′42″E
- Country: Turkey
- Province: Diyarbakır
- District: Dicle
- Population (2022): 1,266
- Time zone: UTC+3 (TRT)

Yeşilsırt (Kurdish: Bazbendi) is a neighbourhood in the municipality and district of Dicle, Diyarbakır Province in Turkey. It is populated by Kurds and had a population of 1,266 in 2022.
