= Altayköy, Dicle =

Village in Turkey

Altayköy
- Neighbourhood
- Location in Turkey
- Coordinates: 38°19′41″N 39°59′13″E
- Country: Turkey
- Province: Diyarbakır
- District: Dicle
- Population (2022): 342
- Time zone: UTC+3 (TRT)

Altayköy (Kurdish: Hopi) is a neighbourhood in the municipality and district of Dicle, Diyarbakır Province in Turkey. It is populated by Kurds and had a population of 342 in 2022.
