= Tepe, Dicle =

Village in Turkey

Tepe
- Neighbourhood
- Location in Turkey
- Coordinates: 38.3817°N 40.2911°E
- Country: Turkey
- Province: Diyarbakır
- District: Dicle
- Population (2022): 303
- Time zone: UTC+3 (TRT)

Tepe (Kurdish: Banqarse) is a neighbourhood in the municipality and district of Dicle, Diyarbakır Province in Turkey. It is populated by Kurds and had a population of 303 in 2022.
