= Kaygısız, Dicle =

Village in Turkey

Kaygısız
- Neighbourhood
- Location in Turkey
- Coordinates: 38°16′35″N 40°18′2″E
- Country: Turkey
- Province: Diyarbakır
- District: Dicle
- Population (2022): 841
- Time zone: UTC+3 (TRT)

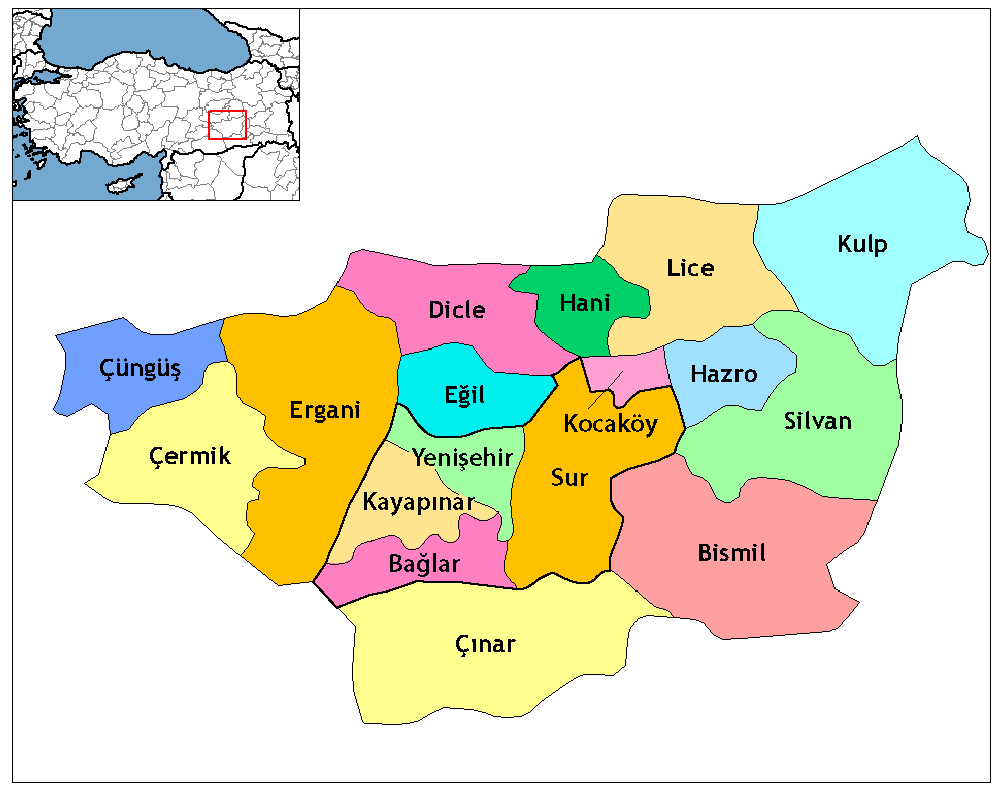
A map showing the districts of Diyarbakır

Kaygısız (Kurdish: Avdelan) is a neighbourhood of the municipality and district of Dicle, Diyarbakır Province, Turkey. It is populated by Kurds and had a population of 841 in 2022.

Before the 2013 reorganisation, it was a town (belde).
