= Ulubaş, Dicle =

Village in Turkey

Ulubaş
- Neighbourhood
- Location in Turkey
- Coordinates: 38°19′N 40°02′E
- Country: Turkey
- Province: Diyarbakır
- District: Dicle
- Population (2022): 145
- Time zone: UTC+3 (TRT)

Ulubaş (Kurdish: Omeran) is a neighbourhood in the municipality and district of Dicle, Diyarbakır Province in Turkey. It is populated by Kurds and had a population of 145 in 2022.
