= Durabeyli, Dicle =

Village in Turkey

Durabeyli
- Neighbourhood
- Location in Turkey
- Coordinates: 38°15′N 40°14′E
- Country: Turkey
- Province: Diyarbakır
- District: Dicle
- Population (2022): 940
- Time zone: UTC+3 (TRT)

Durabeyli (Kurdish: Darat) is a neighbourhood in the municipality and district of Dicle, Diyarbakır Province in Turkey. It is populated by Kurds and had a population of 940 in 2022.
