= Gündoğdu, Dicle =

Village in Turkey

Gündoğdu
- Neighbourhood
- Location in Turkey
- Coordinates: 38°21′56″N 39°54′54″E
- Country: Turkey
- Province: Diyarbakır
- District: Dicle
- Population (2022): 37
- Time zone: UTC+3 (TRT)

Gündoğdu (Kurdish: Xelefan) is a neighbourhood in the municipality and district of Dicle, Diyarbakır Province in Turkey. It is populated by Kurds and had a population of 37 in 2022.
