= Boğazköy, Dicle =

Village in Turkey

Boğazköy
- Neighbourhood
- Location in Turkey
- Coordinates: 38.4241°N 40.1876°E
- Country: Turkey
- Province: Diyarbakır
- District: Dicle
- Population (2022): 104
- Time zone: UTC+3 (TRT)

Boğazköy (Kurdish: Gozeli) is a neighbourhood in the municipality and district of Dicle, Diyarbakır Province in Turkey. It is populated by Kurds and had a population of 104 in 2022.
