= Kurudere, Dicle =

Village in Turkey

Kurudere
- Neighbourhood
- Location in Turkey
- Coordinates: 38°23′33″N 39°59′55″E
- Country: Turkey
- Province: Diyarbakır
- District: Dicle
- Population (2022): 89
- Time zone: UTC+3 (TRT)

Kurudere (Kurdish: Koçigi) is a neighbourhood in the municipality and district of Dicle, Diyarbakır Province in Turkey. It is populated by Kurds and had a population of 89 in 2022.
