= Baturköy, Dicle =

Village in Turkey

Baturköy
- Neighbourhood
- Location in Turkey
- Coordinates: 38°17′N 40°16′E
- Country: Turkey
- Province: Diyarbakır
- District: Dicle
- Population (2022): 1,138
- Time zone: UTC+3 (TRT)

Baturköy (Kurdish: Butelbiyan) is a neighbourhood in the municipality and district of Dicle, Diyarbakır Province in Turkey. It is populated by Kurds and had a population of 1,138 in 2022.
