= Acar, Dicle =

Neighborhood in Dicle, Turkey

Acar
- Neighbourhood
- Location within Turkey
- Coordinates: 38.3620°N 40.1738°E
- Country: Turkey
- Province: Diyarbakır
- District: Dicle
- Population (2022): 553
- Time zone: UTC+3 (TRT)

Acar is a neighbourhood in the municipality and district of Dicle, Diyarbakır Province in Turkey. Its population is 553 (2022).
