= Üzümlü, Dicle =

Village in Turkey

Üzümlü
- Neighbourhood
- Location in Turkey
- Coordinates: 38°16′48″N 40°11′20″E
- Country: Turkey
- Province: Diyarbakır
- District: Dicle
- Population (2022): 2,930
- Time zone: UTC+3 (TRT)

Üzümlü (Kurdish: Îbikan) is a neighbourhood in the municipality and district of Dicle, Diyarbakır Province in Turkey. It is populated by Kurds and had a population of 2,930 in 2022.
