= Bahçeköy, Dicle =

Village in Turkey

Bahçeköy
- Neighbourhood
- Location in Turkey
- Coordinates: 38.3112°N 39.9664°E
- Country: Turkey
- Province: Diyarbakır
- District: Dicle
- Population (2022): 198
- Time zone: UTC+3 (TRT)

Bahçeköy (Kurdish: Bîbnokî) is a neighbourhood in the municipality and district of Dicle, Diyarbakır Province in Turkey. It is populated by Kurds and had a population of 198 in 2022.
