= Koruköy, Dicle =

Village in Turkey

Koruköy
- Neighbourhood
- Location in Turkey
- Coordinates: 38°17′56″N 39°59′30″E
- Country: Turkey
- Province: Diyarbakır
- District: Dicle
- Population (2022): 566
- Time zone: UTC+3 (TRT)

Koruköy (Kurdish: Şulbetan) is a neighbourhood in the municipality and district of Dicle, Diyarbakır Province in Turkey. It is populated by Kurds and had a population of 566 in 2022.
