= Uğrak, Dicle =

Village in Turkey

Uğrak
- Neighbourhood
- Location in Turkey
- Coordinates: 38°19′31″N 40°07′43″E
- Country: Turkey
- Province: Diyarbakır
- District: Dicle
- Population (2022): 281
- Time zone: UTC+3 (TRT)

Uğrak (Kurdish: Zeydan) is a neighbourhood in the municipality and district of Dicle, Diyarbakır Province in Turkey. It is populated by Kurds and had a population of 281 in 2022.
