= Baltacı, Dicle =

Village in Turkey

Baltacı
- Neighbourhood
- Location in Turkey
- Coordinates: 38.3837°N 40.1206°E
- Country: Turkey
- Province: Diyarbakır
- District: Dicle
- Population (2022): 464
- Time zone: UTC+3 (TRT)

Baltacı (Kurdish: Kuferbi) is a neighbourhood in the municipality and district of Dicle, Diyarbakır Province in Turkey. It is populated by Kurds and had a population of 464 in 2022.
