= Kırkpınar, Dicle =

Village in Turkey

Kırkpınar
- Neighbourhood
- Location in Turkey
- Coordinates: 38°25′46″N 40°04′51″E
- Country: Turkey
- Province: Diyarbakır
- District: Dicle
- Population (2022): 70
- Time zone: UTC+3 (TRT)

Kırkpınar (Kurdish: Heridon) is a neighbourhood in the municipality and district of Dicle, Diyarbakır Province in Turkey. It is populated by Kurds and had a population of 70 in 2022.
