= Başköy, Dicle =

Village in Turkey

Başköy
- Neighbourhood
- Location in Turkey
- Coordinates: 38.3917°N 40.2282°E
- Country: Turkey
- Province: Diyarbakır
- District: Dicle
- Population (2022): 1,286
- Time zone: UTC+3 (TRT)

Başköy (Kurdish: Salurî) is a neighbourhood in the municipality and district of Dicle, Diyarbakır Province in Turkey. It is populated by Kurds and had a population of 1,286 in 2022.
