= Pekmezciler, Dicle =

Village in Turkey

Pekmezciler
- Neighbourhood
- Location in Turkey
- Coordinates: 38°18′30″N 40°04′00″E
- Country: Turkey
- Province: Diyarbakır
- District: Dicle
- Population (2022): 594
- Time zone: UTC+3 (TRT)

Pekmezciler (Kurdish: Bawkan) is a neighbourhood in the municipality and district of Dicle, Diyarbakır Province in Turkey. It is populated by Kurds and had a population of 594 in 2022.
