= Kocaalan, Dicle =

Village in Turkey

Kocaalan
- Neighbourhood
- Location in Turkey
- Coordinates: 38°21′19″N 40°07′39″E
- Country: Turkey
- Province: Diyarbakır
- District: Dicle
- Population (2022): 1,118
- Time zone: UTC+3 (TRT)

Kocaalan (Kurdish: Dêran) is a neighbourhood in the municipality and district of Dicle, Diyarbakır Province in Turkey. It is populated by Kurds and had a population of 1,118 in 2022.
