= Kelekçi village destruction =

Destruction the Kelekçi village in Dicle, Turkey

The Kelekçi village destruction occurred in November 1992 in the Dicle district in Diyarbakır Province, Turkey. The Turkish authorities demanded the Muhtar of the Kelekçi village to evacuate all the inhabitants of the village. But as the villagers gathered in an area, the Turkish gendarmerie, using heavy weapons in armored vehicles began firing at the villagers and their houses. Soldiers set fire to and destroyed 136 houses. Some of the villagers escaped to nearby towns, with unknown killed. On the 6 April 1993, the Turkish authorities returned and set fire to the remaining houses. Before its destruction, the village had a population of five-hundred inhabitants.

In July the same year a village guard family had decided to resign from the village guard system that was instituted by Turkey due to three members being killed during an attack by the Kurdistan Workers' Party (PKK).

== International Justice Case ==
Nine families brought their cases to the European Court of Human Rights (ECHR). In 1996 the family members of the village guard family successfully had their case ruled in their favor, which "confirmed that Turkish security forces were indeed guilty of house destruction", a later judgment ruled and thus warded the villagers "pecuniary damages for destruction of the houses, livestock and crops, household property, loss of income, and cost of alternative accommodation, totaling £115,062.76 (U.S$188,702). Each applicant also received £8,000 (U.S.$13,120) in non-pecuniary damages for the emotional trauma they experienced during the destruction of their houses." It was the first case regarding village destruction in Turkish Kurdistan.

Turkey decided that such rulings would be detrimental and costly considering a vast amount of cases existed. The Compensation Law was passed in July 2004 within Turkey that meant families instead of directly going to the European Court of Human Rights (ECHR), they would first have to go through Turkey's system. This meant that Turkey decided the settlements and in some cases offered $3,350 or less. Human Rights Watch wrote to the Turkish Deputy Prime Minister Abdullah Gül on 22 February 2006, "urging that damage assessment should take a more consistent and fairer approach".

=== Condemnations ===
In September 1996 the European Court of Human Rights condemned Turkey. Turkey rejected the European Court of Human Rights' condemnation of Turkey.

== See also ==
- Kurdish villages depopulated by Turkey
- Timeline of the Kurdish–Turkish conflict (1978–present)
