= Değirmenli, Dicle =

Village in Turkey

Değirmenli
- Neighbourhood
- Location in Turkey
- Coordinates: 38°25′3″N 40°12′3″E
- Country: Turkey
- Province: Diyarbakır
- District: Dicle
- Population (2022): 169
- Time zone: UTC+3 (TRT)

Değirmenli (Kurdish: Zixir) is a neighbourhood in the municipality and district of Dicle, Diyarbakır Province in Turkey. It is populated by Kurds and had a population of 169 in 2022.
