= Bahçedere, Dicle =

Village in Turkey

Bahçedere
- Neighbourhood
- Location in Turkey
- Coordinates: 38.3097°N 40.0443°E
- Country: Turkey
- Province: Diyarbakır
- District: Dicle
- Population (2022): 255
- Time zone: UTC+3 (TRT)

Bahçedere (Kurdish: Bilika) is a neighbourhood in the municipality and district of Dicle, Diyarbakır Province in Turkey. It is populated by Kurds and had a population of 255 in 2022.
