= Sergenli, Dicle =

Village in Turkey

Sergenli
- Neighbourhood
- Location in Turkey
- Coordinates: 38°20′N 40°15′E
- Country: Turkey
- Province: Diyarbakır
- District: Dicle
- Population (2022): 952
- Time zone: UTC+3 (TRT)

Sergenli (Kurdish: Nalwer) is a neighbourhood in the municipality and district of Dicle, Diyarbakır Province in Turkey. It is populated by Kurds and had a population of 952 in 2022.
