= Uluçeşme, Dicle =

Village in Turkey

Uluçeşme
- Neighbourhood
- Location in Turkey
- Coordinates: 38°23′N 40°10′E
- Country: Turkey
- Province: Diyarbakır
- District: Dicle
- Population (2022): 146
- Time zone: UTC+3 (TRT)

Uluçeşme (Kurdish: Wurî) is a neighbourhood in the municipality and district of Dicle, Diyarbakır Province in Turkey. It is populated by Kurds and had a population of 146 in 2022.
