= Arıköy, Dicle =

Village in Turkey

Arıköy
- Neighbourhood
- Location in Turkey
- Coordinates: 38.3780°N 40.2668°E
- Country: Turkey
- Province: Diyarbakır
- District: Dicle
- Population (2022): 1,514
- Time zone: UTC+3 (TRT)

Arıköy (Kurdish: Qortenîta cêrêne) is a neighbourhood in the municipality and district of Dicle, Diyarbakır Province in Turkey. It is populated by Kurds and had a population of 1,514 in 2022.
