= Gelincik, Dicle =

Village in Turkey

Gelincik
- Neighbourhood
- Location in Turkey
- Coordinates: 38°25′13″N 40°09′21″E
- Country: Turkey
- Province: Diyarbakır
- District: Dicle
- Population (2022): 861
- Time zone: UTC+3 (TRT)

Gelincik (Kurdish: Erseke) is a neighbourhood in the municipality and district of Dicle, Diyarbakır Province in Turkey. It is populated by Kurds and had a population of 861 in 2022.
