= Biçer, Dicle =

Village in Turkey

Biçer
- Neighbourhood
- Location in Turkey
- Coordinates: 38.3722°N 40.0193°E
- Country: Turkey
- Province: Diyarbakır
- District: Dicle
- Population (2022): 143
- Time zone: UTC+3 (TRT)

Biçer (Kurdish: Akrage) is a neighbourhood in the municipality and district of Dicle, Diyarbakır Province in Turkey. It is populated by Kurds and had a population of 143 in 2022.
