= Çavlı, Dicle =

Çavlı
- Neighbourhood
- Location in Turkey
- Coordinates: 38.293°N 39.972°E
- Country: Turkey
- Province: Diyarbakır
- District: Dicle
- Population (2022): 483
- Time zone: UTC+3 (TRT)

Çavlı (Kurdish: Himbêl) is a neighbourhood in the municipality and district of Dicle, Diyarbakır Province in Turkey. It is populated by Kurds and had a population of 483 in 2022.

== Geography ==
It is 76 km from Diyarbakır and 16 km from Dicle.

== Population ==
Historical population
Year	Pop.	±% p.a.
1997	441	—
2007	433	−0.18%
2012	496	+2.75%
2017	442	−2.28%
2022	483	+1.79%
Source: 1997 census and TÜIK (2007-2022)
