= Gölbaşı, Dicle =

Village in Turkey

Gölbaşı
- Neighbourhood
- Country: Turkey
- Province: Diyarbakır
- District: Dicle
- Population (2022): 48
- Time zone: UTC+3 (TRT)

Gölbaşı is a neighbourhood in the municipality and district of Dicle, Diyarbakır Province in Turkey. Its population is 48 (2022).
