= Kelekçi, Dicle =

Village in Turkey

Kelekçi
- Neighbourhood
- Location in Turkey
- Coordinates: 38°26′03″N 40°12′08″E
- Country: Turkey
- Province: Diyarbakır
- District: Dicle
- Population (2022): 112
- Time zone: UTC+3 (TRT)

Kelekçi (Kurdish: Kelkom) is a neighbourhood in the municipality and district of Dicle, Diyarbakır Province in Turkey. It is populated by Kurds and had a population of 112 in 2022.

In November 1992 and April 1993 the village was depopulated and destroyed by the Turkish authorities as the villagers did not want to be a part the Village Guards system.

== See also ==
- Kelekçi village destruction
