= Bozaba, Dicle =

Village in Turkey

Bozaba
- Neighbourhood
- Location in Turkey
- Coordinates: 38°20′N 40°07′E
- Country: Turkey
- Province: Diyarbakır
- District: Dicle
- Population (2022): 1,431
- Time zone: UTC+3 (TRT)

Bozaba (Kurdish: Qelbin) is a neighbourhood in the municipality and district of Dicle, Diyarbakır Province in Turkey. It is populated by Kurds and had a population of 1,431 in 2022.
