= Yokuşlu, Dicle =

Village in Turkey

Yokuşlu
- Neighbourhood
- Location in Turkey
- Coordinates: 38°25′16″N 40°01′05″E
- Country: Turkey
- Province: Diyarbakır
- District: Dicle
- Population (2022): 574
- Time zone: UTC+3 (TRT)

Yokuşlu (Kurdish: Şingirig) is a neighbourhood in the municipality and district of Dicle, Diyarbakır Province in Turkey. It is populated by Kurds and had a population of 574 in 2022.
