= Kayıköy, Dicle =

Village in Turkey

Kayıköy
- Neighbourhood
- Location in Turkey
- Coordinates: 38°27′25″N 40°02′11″E
- Country: Turkey
- Province: Diyarbakır
- District: Dicle
- Population (2022): 11
- Time zone: UTC+3 (TRT)

Kayıköy (Kurdish: Şingirika jor) is a neighbourhood in the municipality and district of Dicle, Diyarbakır Province in Turkey. It is populated by Kurds and had a population of 11 in 2022.
