= Boğaz, Dicle =

Village in Turkey

Boğaz
- Neighbourhood
- Location in Turkey
- Coordinates: 38.4398°N 39.9594°E
- Country: Turkey
- Province: Diyarbakır
- District: Dicle
- Population (2022): 519
- Time zone: UTC+3 (TRT)

Boğaz (Kurdish: Behro) is a neighbourhood in the municipality and district of Dicle, Diyarbakır Province in Turkey. It is populated by Kurds and had a population of 591 in 2022.
