= Tepebaşı, Dicle =

Village in Turkey

Tepebaşı
- Neighbourhood
- Location in Turkey
- Coordinates: 38°18′43″N 40°10′52″E
- Country: Turkey
- Province: Diyarbakır
- District: Dicle
- Population (2022): 933
- Time zone: UTC+3 (TRT)

Tepebaşı (Kurdish: Şêxmalan) is a neighbourhood in the municipality and district of Dicle, Diyarbakır Province in Turkey. It is populated by Kurds and had a population of 933 in 2022.
