= Döğer, Dicle =

Village in Turkey

Döğer
- Neighbourhood
- Location in Turkey
- Coordinates: 38°21′25″N 40°13′30″E
- Country: Turkey
- Province: Diyarbakır
- District: Dicle
- Population (2022): 1,544
- Time zone: UTC+3 (TRT)

Döğer (Kurdish: Dibni) is a neighbourhood in the municipality and district of Dicle, Diyarbakır Province in Turkey. It is populated by Kurds and had a population of 1,544 in 2022.
