= Dicle =

- District and municipality
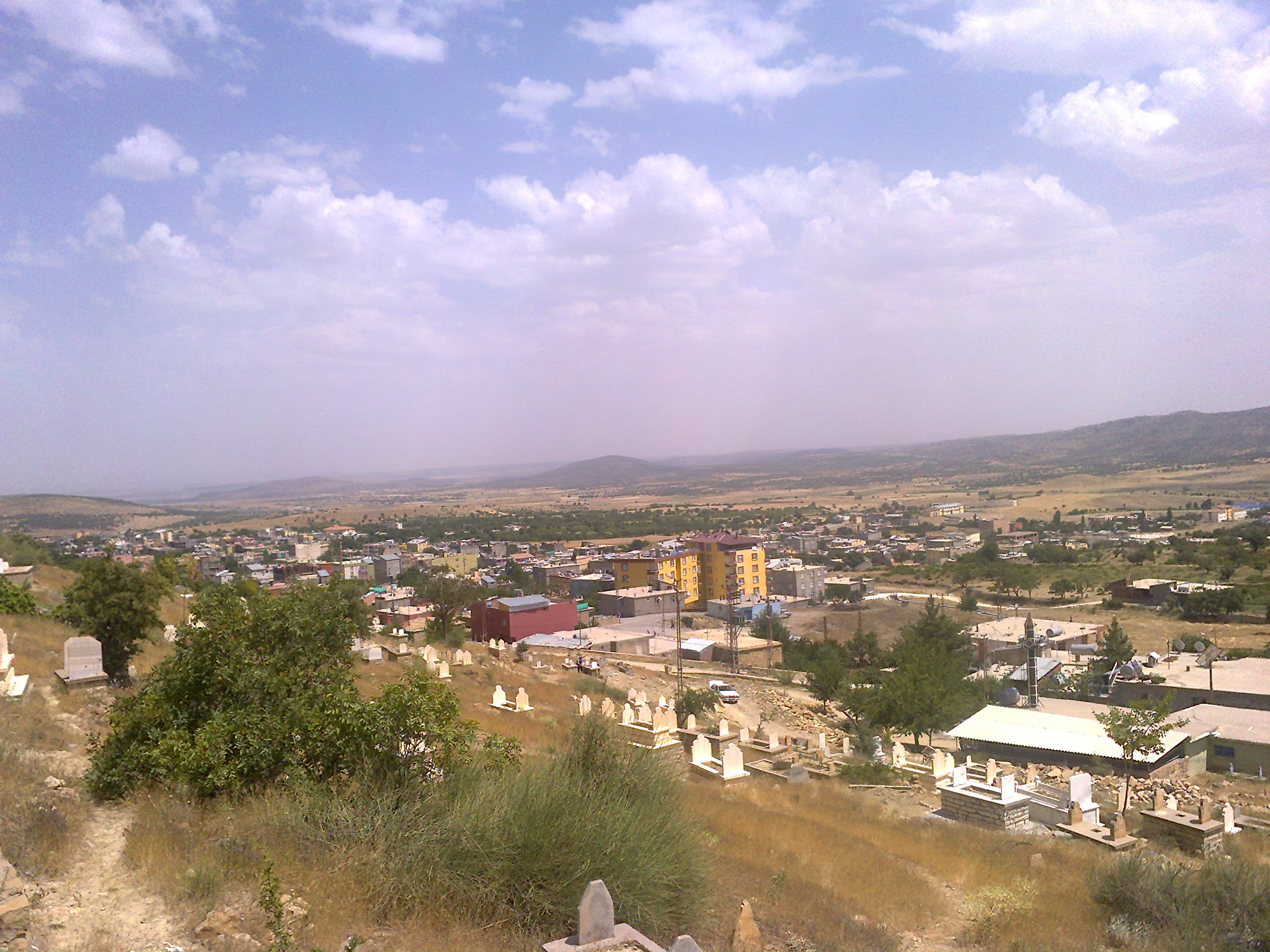

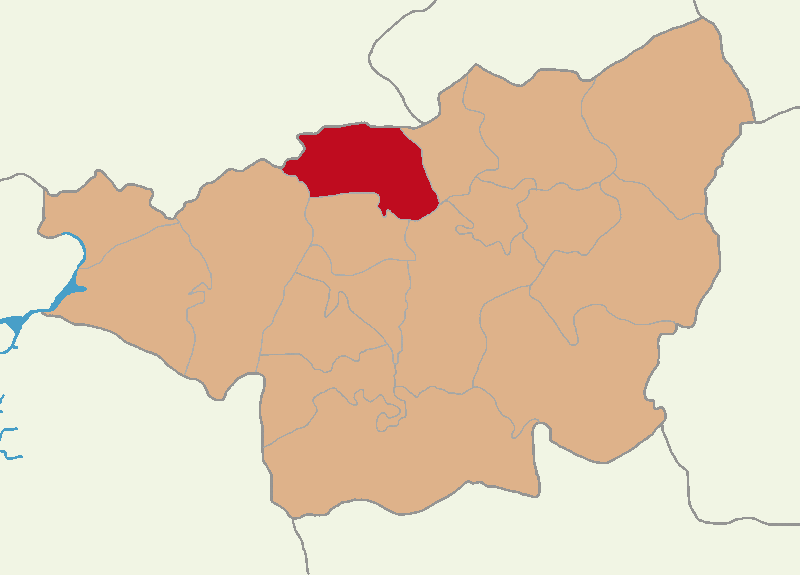
- Map showing Dicle District in Diyarbakır Province

- Location within Turkey
- Coordinates: 38°22′30″N 40°04′24″E
- Country: Turkey
- Province: Diyarbakır

Government
  - Mayor: Felat Aygören (HDP)
- Area: 738 km^{2} (285 sq mi)
- Population (2022): 36,114
  - Density: 48.9/km^{2} (127/sq mi)
- Time zone: UTC+3 (TRT)
- Postal code: 21830
- Area code: 0412

Dicle (Kurdish: Pîran Ottoman Turkish: پيران) is a municipality and district of Diyarbakır Province, Turkey. Its area is 738 km^{2}, and its population is 36,114 (2022). It is populated by Kurds. The mayor is Felat Aygören from the HDP.

Dicle is the Kurdish and Turkish name of the Tigris river, which runs through the district and gave its name to it. The name derives from tighri- (arrow) from Avestan and cognate with "tîj, tîr" (sharp, arrow) in Kurdish and tigra- (sharp, pointed) in Old Persian. Some claim that it derives from Akkadian Idiqlat through the original Sumerian name for the river, Idigna.

== Composition ==
There are 48 neighbourhoods in Dicle District:

- 15 Temmuz
- Acar
- Altayköy
- Arıköy
- Bademli
- Bağlarbaşı
- Bahçedere
- Bahçeköy
- Baltacı
- Başköy
- Baturköy
- Biçer
- Boğaz
- Boğazköy
- Bozaba
- Çavlı
- Çelebi
- Dedeköy
- Değirmenli
- Döğer
- Durabeyli
- Gelincik
- Gölbaşı
- Gündoğdu
- Kaygısız
- Kayıköy
- Kelekçi
- Kırklar
- Kırkpınar
- Kocaalan
- Koruköy
- Kurşunlu
- Kurudere
- Meydanköy
- Pekmezciler
- Pınar
- Sergenli
- Süsümlü
- Taşağıl
- Tepe
- Tepebaşı
- Uğrak
- Ulubaş
- Uluçeşme
- Üzümlü
- Yeşilsırt
- Yeşiltepe
- Yokuşlu
