= Vişneli, Çemişgezek =

Village in Tunceli Province, Turkey

Vişneli
- Village
- Location within Turkey
- Coordinates: 39.017°N 38.896°E
- Country: Turkey
- Province: Tunceli
- District: Çemişgezek
- Population (2021): 118
- Time zone: UTC+3 (TRT)

Vişneli (Kurdish: Birihi) is a village in the Çemişgezek District, Tunceli Province, Turkey. The village is populated by Kurds of the Şikakî and had a population of 118 in 2021.

The hamlet of Karşıtepe is attached to the village.
