= Dorutay, Pertek =

Village in Tunceli Province, Turkey

Dorutay
- Village
- Location within Turkey
- Coordinates: 38.9417°N 39.2237°E
- Country: Turkey
- Province: Tunceli
- District: Pertek
- Population (2021): 219
- Time zone: UTC+3 (TRT)

Dorutay (Kurdish: Zêve) is a village in the Pertek District, Tunceli Province, Turkey. The village is populated by Kurds of the Şikakî tribe and had a population of 219 in 2021.

The hamlet of Kolbaşı is attached to the village.
