= Doğan, Çemişgezek =

Village in Tunceli Province, Turkey

Doğan
- Village
- Location within Turkey
- Coordinates: 38.971°N 39.029°E
- Country: Turkey
- Province: Tunceli
- District: Çemişgezek
- Population (2021): 209
- Time zone: UTC+3 (TRT)

Doğan (Kurdish: Doxan, Dohuk) is a village in the Çemişgezek District, Tunceli Province, Turkey. The village is populated by Kurds of the Şikakî tribe and had a population of 209 in 2021.

The hamlet of Yakacık is attached to the village.
