= Yemişdere, Çemişgezek =

Village in Tunceli Province, Turkey

Yemişdere
- Village
- Location within Turkey
- Coordinates: 38.921°N 38.988°E
- Country: Turkey
- Province: Tunceli
- District: Çemişgezek
- Population (2021): 210
- Time zone: UTC+3 (TRT)

Yemişdere (Kurdish: Dewdirej) is a village in the Çemişgezek District, Tunceli Province, Turkey. The village is populated by Kurds of the Şikakî tribe and had a population of 210 in 2021.

The hamlet of Kuşlu is attached to the village.
