= Yukarıgülbahçe, Pertek =

Village in Tunceli Province, Turkey

Yukarıgülbahçe
- Village
- Location within Turkey
- Coordinates: 38.9555°N 39.1696°E
- Country: Turkey
- Province: Tunceli
- District: Pertek
- Population (2021): 48
- Time zone: UTC+3 (TRT)

Yukarıgülbahçe (Kurdish: Kurmeşa jorin, Orcan) is a village in the Pertek District, Tunceli Province, Turkey. The village is populated by Kurds of the Şikakî tribe and had a population of 48 in 2021.

The hamlet of Bayırlı is attached to the village.
