= Sarıbalta =

Sarıbalta can refer to:

- Sarıbalta, Çemişgezek
- Sarıbalta, Çermik
