= Çukurca, Pertek =

Village in Tunceli Province, Turkey

Çukurca
- Village
- Location within Turkey
- Coordinates: 38.922°N 39.076°E
- Country: Turkey
- Province: Tunceli
- District: Pertek
- Population (2021): 142
- Time zone: UTC+3 (TRT)

Çukurca (Kurdish: Baravan) is a village in the Pertek District, Tunceli Province, Turkey. The village is populated by Kurds of the Şikakî tribe and had a population of 142 in 2021.

The hamlet of Tuzbaşı is attached to the village.
