= Payamdüzü, Çemişgezek =

Village in Tunceli Province, Turkey

Payamdüzü
- Village
- Location within Turkey
- Coordinates: 38.977°N 38.987°E
- Country: Turkey
- Province: Tunceli
- District: Çemişgezek
- Population (2021): 423
- Time zone: UTC+3 (TRT)

Payamdüzü (Kurdish: Sinsor) is a village in the Çemişgezek District, Tunceli Province, Turkey. The village is populated by Kurds of the Qoçan and Şikakî tribes and had a population of 423 in 2021.

The hamlet of Köçek is attached to the village.
