= Kıraçlar, Çemişgezek =

Village in Tunceli Province, Turkey

Kıraçlar
- Village
- Location within Turkey
- Coordinates: 38.907°N 38.800°E
- Country: Turkey
- Province: Tunceli
- District: Çemişgezek
- Population (2021): 97
- Time zone: UTC+3 (TRT)

Kıraçlar (Kurdish: Hidiroz) is a village in the Çemişgezek District, Tunceli Province, Turkey. The village is populated by Kurds of the Şikakî tribe and had a population of 97 in 2021.

The hamlet of Yağmurlu is attached to the village.
