= Ayazpınar, Pertek =

Village in Tunceli Province, Turkey

Ayazpınar
- Village
- Location within Turkey
- Coordinates: 38.926°N 39.058°E
- Country: Turkey
- Province: Tunceli
- District: Pertek
- Population (2021): 233
- Time zone: UTC+3 (TRT)

Ayazpınar (Kurdish: Titinik) is a village in the Pertek District, Tunceli Province, Turkey. The village is populated by Kurds of the Şikakî tribe and had a population of 233 in 2021.
