= Çakırbahçe, Pertek =

Village in Tunceli Province, Turkey

Çakırbahçe
- Village
- Location within Turkey
- Coordinates: 38.8926°N 39.2718°E
- Country: Turkey
- Province: Tunceli
- District: Pertek
- Population (2021): 114
- Time zone: UTC+3 (TRT)

Çakırbahçe (Kurdish: Coravan) is a village in the Pertek District, Tunceli Province, Turkey. The village is populated by Kurds of the Şikakî tribe and had a population of 114 in 2021.

The hamlet of Karadere is attached to the village.
