= Ballıdut, Pertek =

Village in Tunceli Province, Turkey

Ballıdut
- Village
- Location within Turkey
- Coordinates: 38.9096°N 39.1339°E
- Country: Turkey
- Province: Tunceli
- District: Pertek
- Population (2021): 38
- Time zone: UTC+3 (TRT)

Ballıdut (Kurdish: Koxpinik) is a village in the Pertek District, Tunceli Province, Turkey. The village is populated by Kurds of the Şikakî tribe and had a population of 38 in 2021.

The hamlet of Tarlacık is attached to the village.
