= Sakyol, Çemişgezek =

Village in Tunceli Province, Turkey

Sakyol
- Village
- Location within Turkey
- Coordinates: 38.922°N 38.836°E
- Country: Turkey
- Province: Tunceli
- District: Çemişgezek
- Population (2021): 54
- Time zone: UTC+3 (TRT)

Sakyol (Kurdish: Pulur) is a village in the Çemişgezek District, Tunceli Province, Turkey. The village is populated by Kurds of the Şikakî tribe and by Turks. It had a population of 54 in 2021.

The hamlet of Yuvacık is attached to the village.

== Archaeology ==
Pulur (Sakyol) is an important prehistoric archaeological site near the village (tr:Pulur / Sakyol Höyük) that had been flooded by the Keban Dam. Rescue excavations were conducted here by Hamit Z. Koşay from 1968 to 1971 before the artificial lake was created.

Artifacts of the Kura–Araxes culture were found, as well as some religious-oriented structures. In front of the altars, terracotta cult hearths were located, which were unique to Kura-Araxes culture. Their inner space resembled a ship bow divided into three parts; the upper platforms were red-painted and decorated with geometric figures. Statuette of women and men, as well as of worship animals, such as horses, bulls and rams were found near these hearths. The horseshoe-shaped mobile shrines with ram protome sculptures, as well as three-legged pedestals, and phallus-shaped pendant figures were also of religious nature.

Pulur Sakyol mound represents one of the most extreme points in the northern spread of the Kura-Aras Culture.

In 2021, the waters of the lake receded because of a drought in the area, and the mound was investigated once again. An intra-settlement cemetery was located to the northwest of Pulur Sakyol. Some important elite tombs were found there.

== See also ==
- Norşuntepe
