= Uzungöl, Çemişgezek =

Village in Tunceli Province, Turkey

Uzungöl
- Village
- Location within Turkey
- Coordinates: 38.955°N 38.900°E
- Country: Turkey
- Province: Tunceli
- District: Çemişgezek
- Population (2021): 122
- Time zone: UTC+3 (TRT)

Uzungöl (Kurdish: Axgî) is a village in the Çemişgezek District, Tunceli Province, Turkey. The village is populated by Kurds of the Şikakî tribe and by Turks. It had a population of 122 in 2021.
