= Bulgurtepe, Pertek =

Village in Tunceli Province, Turkey

Bulgurtepe
- Village
- Location within Turkey
- Coordinates: 38.992°N 39.099°E
- Country: Turkey
- Province: Tunceli
- District: Pertek
- Population (2021): 52
- Time zone: UTC+3 (TRT)

Bulgurtepe (Kurdish: Celedor) is a village in the Pertek District, Tunceli Province, Turkey. The village is populated by Kurds of the Şikakî tribe and had a population of 52 in 2021.

The hamlets of Çayırcık and Karakuz are attached to the village.
