= Aşağıgülbahçe, Pertek =

Village in Tunceli Province, Turkey

Aşağıgülbahçe
- Village
- Location within Turkey
- Coordinates: 38.9307°N 39.1724°E
- Country: Turkey
- Province: Tunceli
- District: Pertek
- Population (2021): 148
- Time zone: UTC+3 (TRT)

Aşağıgülbahçe (Kurdish: Kurmeş) is a village in the Pertek District, Tunceli Province, Turkey. The village is populated by Kurds of the Şikakî tribe and had a population of 148 in 2021.
