= Pertek District =

District of Tunceli Province, Turkey

- District
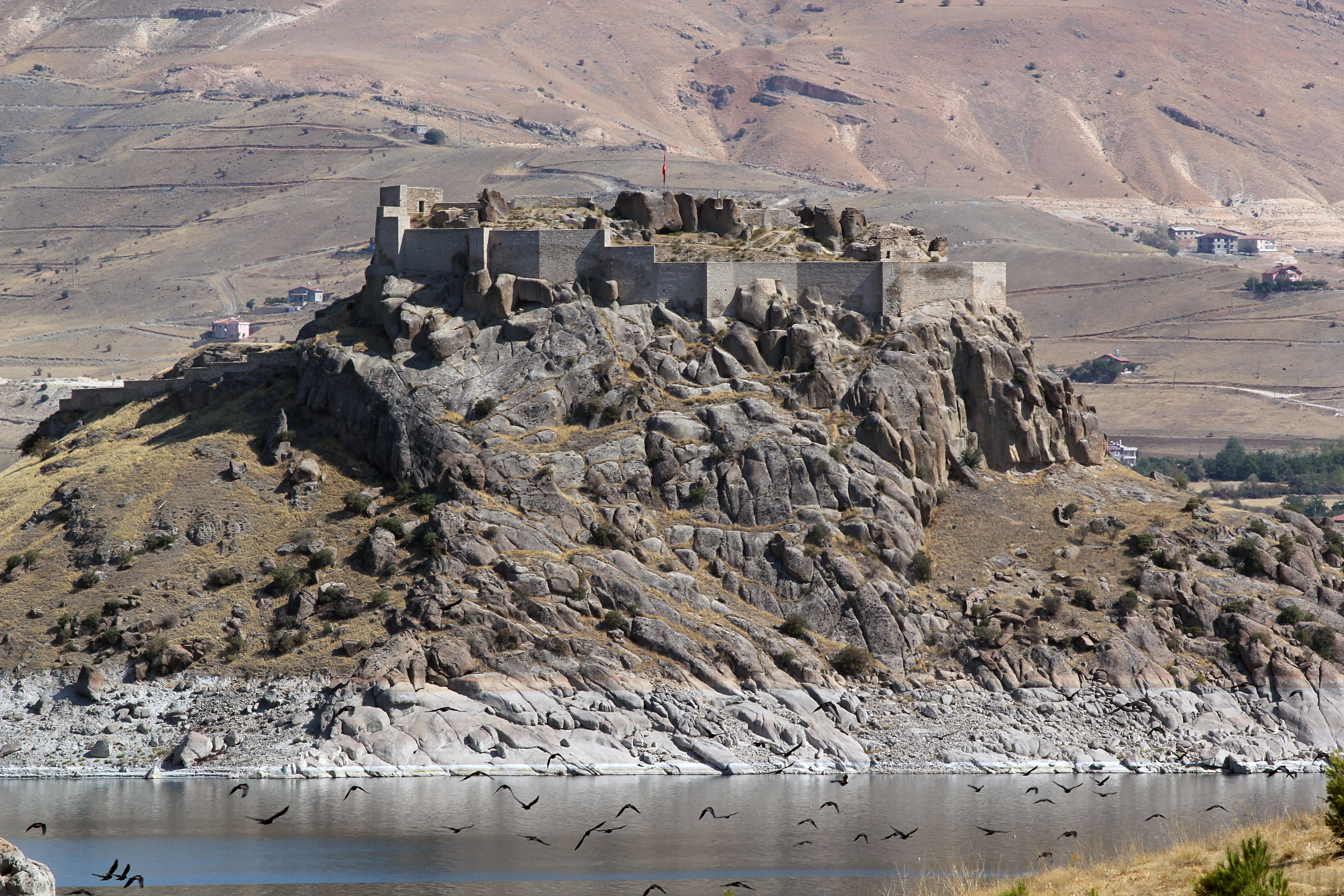
- Pertek Castle

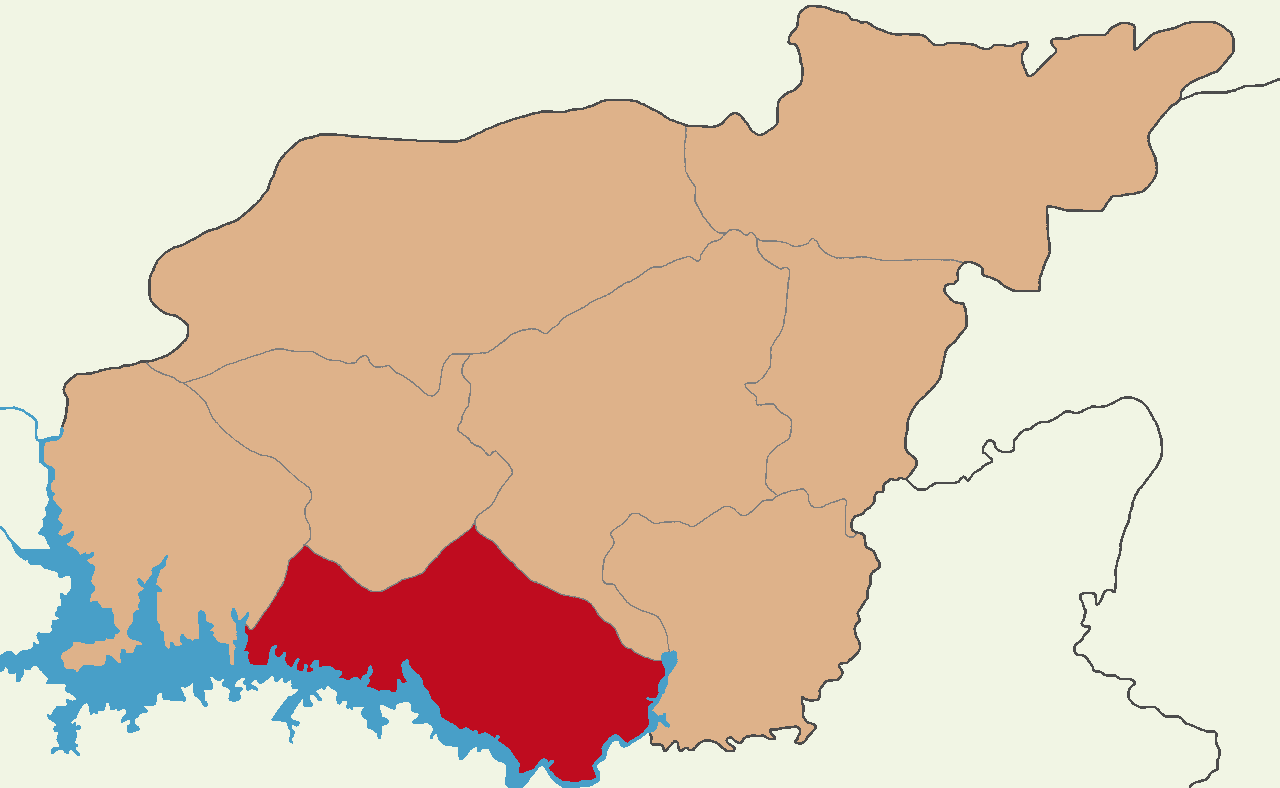
- Map showing Pertek District in Tunceli Province

- Location within Turkey
- Coordinates: 38°52′N 39°20′E
- Country: Turkey
- Province: Tunceli
- Seat: Pertek
- Area: 858 km^{2} (331 sq mi)
- Population (2021): 11,011
  - Density: 12.8/km^{2} (33.2/sq mi)
- Time zone: UTC+3 (TRT)
- Website: www.pertek.gov.tr

Pertek District is a district of Tunceli Province in Turkey. The town of Pertek is its seat and the district had a population of 11,011 in 2021. Its area is 858 km^{2}. Kaymakam is Arif Gül.

== Composition ==
Beside the town of Pertek, the district encompasses forty-five villages and seventy-five hamlets.

=== Villages ===
- Akdemir
- Ardıç
- Arpalı
- Aşağıgülbahçe
- Ayazpınar
- Bakırlı
- Ballıdut
- Beydamı
- Biçmekaya
- Bulgurtepe
- Çakırbahçe
- Çalıözü
- Çataksu
- Çukurca
- Demirsaban
- Dere
- Dereli
- Dorutay
- Elmakaşı
- Geçityaka
- Gövdeli
- Günboğazı
- Kacarlar
- Karagüney
- Kayabağ
- Kazılı
- Koçpınar
- Kolankaya
- Konaklar
- Konurat
- Korluca
- Mercimek
- Pınarlar
- Pirinççi
- Sağman
- Söğütlütepe
- Sumak
- Sürgüç
- Tozkoparan
- Ulupınar
- Yalınkaya
- Yamaçoba
- Yeniköy
- Yukarıgülbahçe
- Yukarıyakabaşı
