= Gövdeli, Pertek =

Village in Tunceli Province, Turkey

Gövdeli
- Village
- Location within Turkey
- Coordinates: 38.9178°N 39.1194°E
- Country: Turkey
- Province: Tunceli
- District: Pertek
- Population (2021): 18
- Time zone: UTC+3 (TRT)

Gövdeli (Kurdish: Taxsiyan) is a village in the Pertek District, Tunceli Province, Turkey. The village is populated by Kurds of the Şikakî tribe and had a population of 18 in 2021.
