= Gedikler, Çemişgezek =

Village in Tunceli Province, Turkey

Gedikler
- Village
- Location within Turkey
- Coordinates: 39.089°N 38.807°E
- Country: Turkey
- Province: Tunceli
- District: Çemişgezek
- Population (2021): 125
- Time zone: UTC+3 (TRT)

Gedikler (Kurdish: Germili) is a village in the Çemişgezek District, Tunceli Province, Turkey. The village is populated by Kurds of the Şikakî tribe and by Turks. It had a population of 125 in 2021.

The hamlets of Aşağıdedebeyli, Alçılı, Ergenler, Keçeli, Kumluca, Varlıkonak and Yukarıdemirbük are attached to the village.
