= Mercimek, Pertek =

Village in Tunceli Province, Turkey

Mercimek
- Village
- Location within Turkey
- Coordinates: 38.8621°N 39.3906°E
- Country: Turkey
- Province: Tunceli
- District: Pertek
- Population (2021): 138
- Time zone: UTC+3 (TRT)

Mercimek is a village in the Pertek District, Tunceli Province, Turkey. The village is populated by Kurds and had a population of 138 in 2021.

The hamlet of Yelören is attached to the village.
