= Toratlı, Çemişgezek =

Village in Tunceli Province, Turkey

Toratlı
- Village
- Location within Turkey
- Coordinates: 39.062°N 39.010°E
- Country: Turkey
- Province: Tunceli
- District: Çemişgezek
- Population (2021): 127
- Time zone: UTC+3 (TRT)

Toratlı (Kurdish: Deke) is a village in the Çemişgezek District, Tunceli Province, Turkey. The village is populated by Kurds of Ferhadan tribe and had a population of 127 in 2021.

The hamlet of Taşlık is attached to the village.
