= Çemişgezek District =

District of Tunceli Province, Turkey

- District
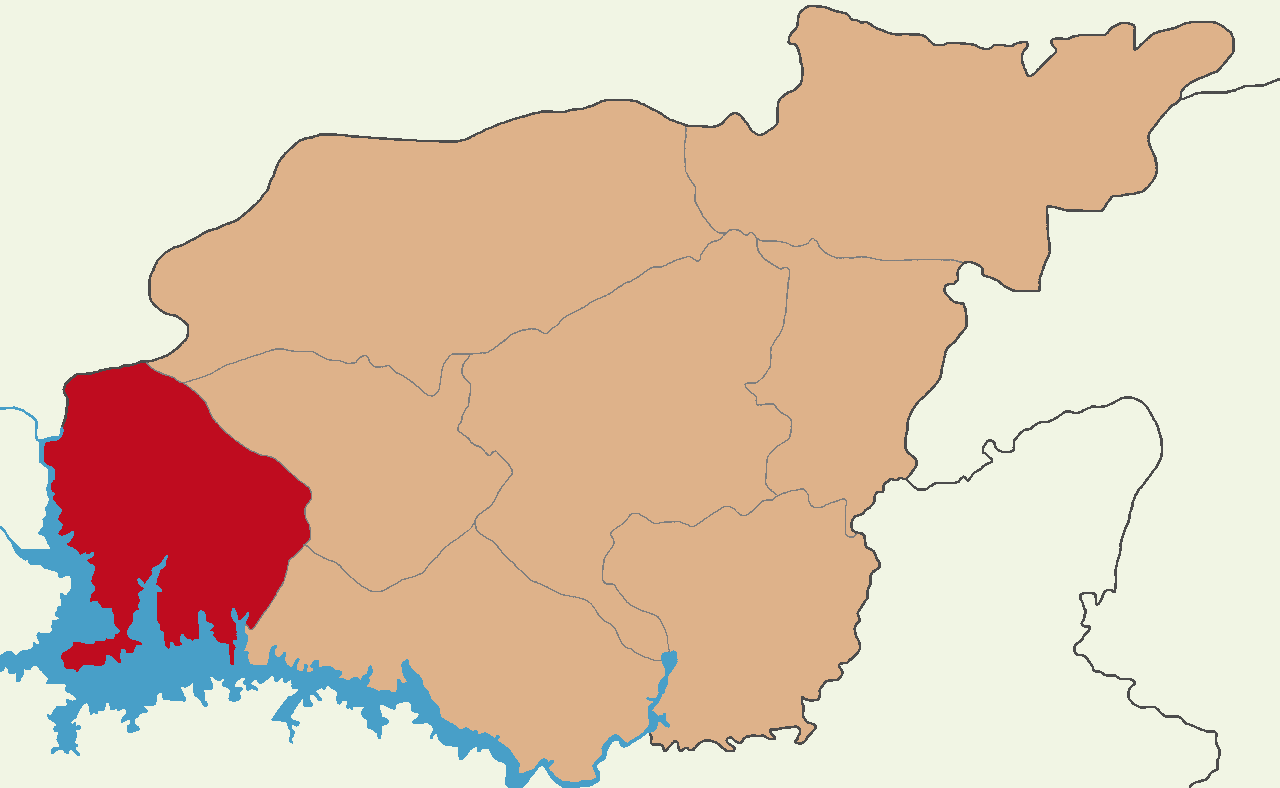
- Map showing Çemişgezek District in Tunceli Province

- Location in Turkey
- Coordinates: 39°04′N 38°54′E
- Country: Turkey
- Province: Tunceli
- Seat: Çemişgezek
- Area: 851 km^{2} (329 sq mi)
- Population (2021): 7,418
  - Density: 8.7/km^{2} (23/sq mi)
- Time zone: UTC+3 (TRT)
- Website: www.cemisgezek.gov.tr

Çemişgezek District is a district of Tunceli Province in Turkey. The town of Çemişgezek is its seat and the district had a population of 7,481 in 2021. Its area is 851 km^{2}.

== Composition ==
Beside the town of Çemişgezek, the district encompasses thirty-four villages and forty-one hamlets.

=== Villages ===
1. Akçapınar
2. Akçayunt
3. Alakuş
4. Anıl
5. Arpaderen
6. Aşağıbudak
7. Aşağıdemirbük
8. Bağsuyu
9. Bozağaç
10. Büyükörence
11. Cebe
12. Cihangir
13. Dedebeyli
14. Doğan
15. Doğanalan
16. Erkalkan
17. Gedikler
18. Gözlüçayır
19. Gülbahçe
20. Güneybaşı
21. Karasar
22. Kıraçlar
23. Paşacık
24. Payamdüzü
25. Sakyol
26. Sarıbalta
27. Tekeli
28. Toratlı
29. Ulukale
30. Uzungöl
31. Vişneli
32. Yemişdere
33. Yukarıbudak
34. Yünbüken

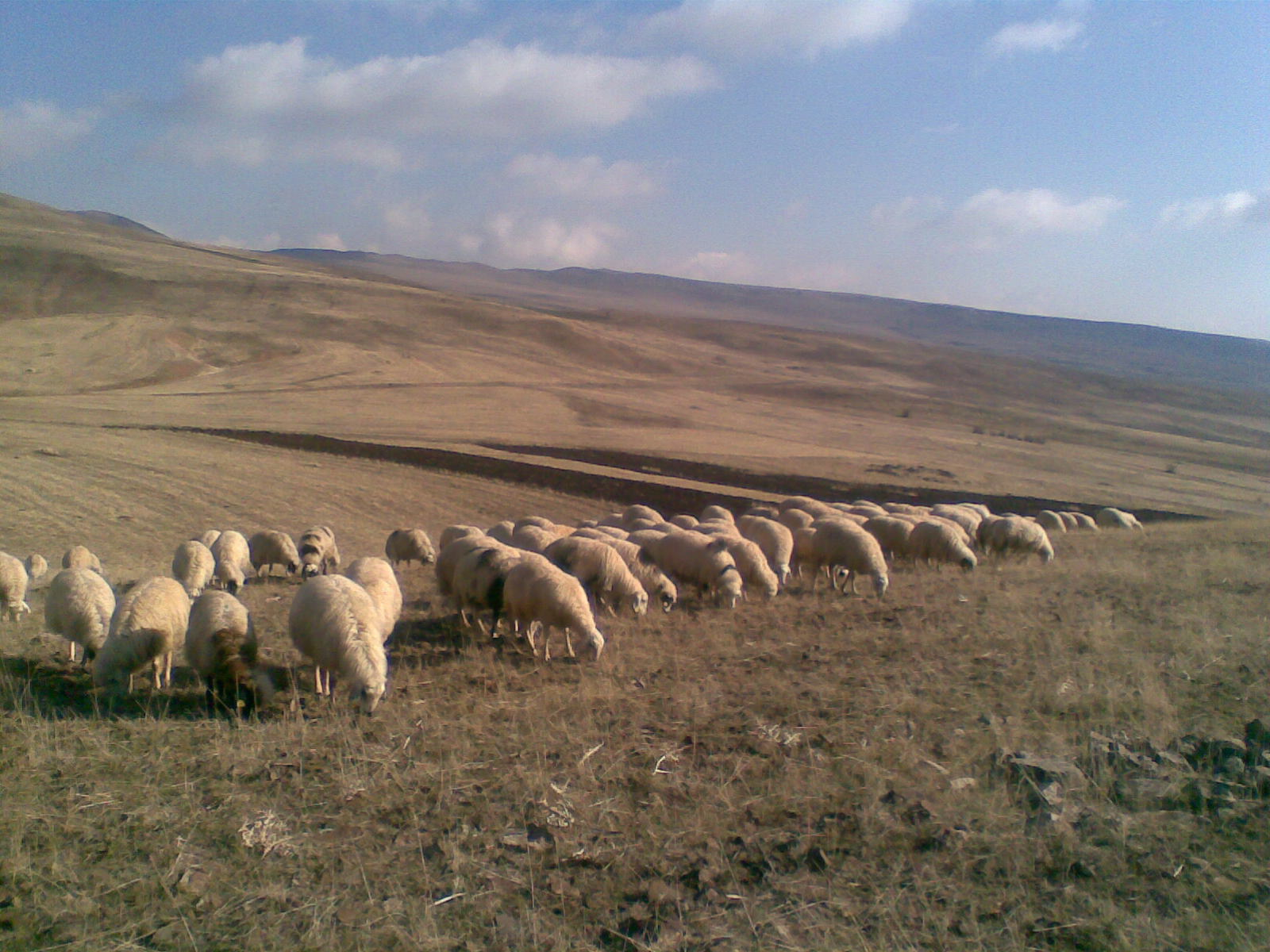
sheep grazing near Cebe, Çemişgezek
