= Ağaçyurdu, Güçlükonak =

Village in Şırnak Province, Turkey

Ağaçyurdu
- Village
- Location within Turkey
- Coordinates: 37.582°N 41.938°E
- Country: Turkey
- Province: Şırnak
- District: Güçlükonak
- Population (2021): 4
- Time zone: UTC+3 (TRT)

Ağaçyurdu (Kurdish: Zivinga şikaka) is a village in the Güçlükonak District of Şırnak Province in Turkey. It is populated by Kurds of the Jilyan tribe and had a population of 4 in 2021.
