= Ulupınar, Pertek =

Village in Tunceli Province, Turkey

Ulupınar
- Village
- Location within Turkey
- Coordinates: 39.00561°N 39.31072°E
- Country: Turkey
- Province: Tunceli
- District: Pertek
- Population (2021): 86
- Time zone: UTC+3 (TRT)

Ulupınar (Kurdish: Ûlûpar) is a village in the Pertek District, Tunceli Province, Turkey. The village is populated by Kurds of the Pilvenk tribe and had a population of 86 in 2021.

The hamlets of Hüseyinbaba and Kesmetaş are attached to the village.
