= Çobankazanı, Güçlükonak =

Village in Şırnak Province, Turkey

Çobankazanı
- Village
- Location within Turkey
- Coordinates: 37.487°N 41.911°E
- Country: Turkey
- Province: Şırnak
- District: Güçlükonak
- Population (2021): 396
- Time zone: UTC+3 (TRT)

Çobankazanı (Kurdish: Şehrika) is a village in the Güçlükonak District of Şırnak Province in Turkey. It is populated by Kurds of the Harunan tribe and had a population of 396 in 2021.

The hamlet of Soğucak is attached to the village.
