= Koçpınar, Pertek =

Village in Tunceli Province, Turkey

Koçpınar
- Village
- Location within Turkey
- Coordinates: 38.8477°N 39.5178°E
- Country: Turkey
- Province: Tunceli
- District: Pertek
- Population (2021): 94
- Time zone: UTC+3 (TRT)

Koçpınar (Kurdish: Qoçpixar) is a village in the Pertek District, Tunceli Province, Turkey. The village is populated by Kurds and had a population of 94 in 2021.

The hamlets of Akmezar, Komşulu and Solak are attached to the village.
