= Yağızoymak, Güçlükonak =

Village in Şırnak Province, Turkey

Yağızoymak
- Village
- Location within Turkey
- Coordinates: 37.572°N 42.007°E
- Country: Turkey
- Province: Şırnak
- District: Güçlükonak
- Population (2021): 48
- Time zone: UTC+3 (TRT)

Yağızoymak (Kurdish: Zivinga Hecîelî) is a village in the Güçlükonak District of Şırnak Province in Turkey. It is populated by Kurds of the Hecî Elya tribe and had a population of 48 in 2021.
