= Alakuş, Çemişgezek =

Village in Tunceli Province, Turkey

Alakuş
- Village
- Location within Turkey
- Coordinates: 39.087°N 38.834°E
- Country: Turkey
- Province: Tunceli
- District: Çemişgezek
- Population (2021): 80
- Time zone: UTC+3 (TRT)

Alakuş (also known as Mamsa) is a village in the Çemişgezek District, Tunceli Province, Turkey. The village is populated by Turks and had a population of 80 in 2021.
