= Söğütlütepe, Pertek =

Village in Tunceli Province, Turkey

Söğütlütepe
- Village
- Location within Turkey
- Coordinates: 38.9658°N 39.3053°E
- Country: Turkey
- Province: Tunceli
- District: Pertek
- Population (2021): 72
- Time zone: UTC+3 (TRT)

Söğütlütepe (Kurdish: Gulbarî) is a village in the Pertek District, Tunceli Province, Turkey. The village is populated by Kurds of the Pilvenk tribe and had a population of 72 in 2021.
