= Güçlükonak =

Town in Şırnak Province, Turkey

- Municipality
- Location in Turkey
- Coordinates: 37°28′16″N 41°54′50″E
- Country: Turkey
- Province: Şırnak
- District: Güçlükonak
- Population (2021): 4,462
- Time zone: UTC+3 (TRT)

Güçlükonak (Kurdish: Basan) is a town and seat of the Güçlükonak District in Şırnak Province, Turkey. The town is populated by Kurds of the Harunan tribe and had a population of 4,462 in 2021.

== Neighborhoods ==
The town is divided into the neighborhoods of Bağlar and Yeni Mahalle.

== History ==
In 1995 as the Şırnak Province was governed in a state of emergency, it was the scene of the Güçlükonak massacre in which 11 men lost their lives. As of January 2020, no person has been charged for the massacre.
