= Anıl, Çemişgezek =

Village in Tunceli Province, Turkey

Anıl
- Village
- Location within Turkey
- Coordinates: 39.1200°N 38.8889°E
- Country: Turkey
- Province: Tunceli
- District: Çemişgezek
- Population (2021): 129
- Time zone: UTC+3 (TRT)

Anıl (Kurdish: Hazarî) is a village in the Çemişgezek District, Tunceli Province, Turkey. The village is populated by Kurds of the Qoçan tribe and had a population of 129 in 2021.

The hamlet of Kızılevler is attached to the village.
