= Ormaniçi, Güçlükonak =

Village in Şırnak Province, Turkey

Ormaniçi
- Village
- Location within Turkey
- Coordinates: 37.453°N 41.957°E
- Country: Turkey
- Province: Şırnak
- District: Güçlükonak
- Population (2021): 178
- Time zone: UTC+3 (TRT)

Ormaniçi (Kurdish: Bana) is a village in the Güçlükonak District of Şırnak Province in Turkey. It is populated by Kurds of Welatî tribe and had a population of 178 in 2021.
