= Yalınkaya, Pertek =

Village in Tunceli Province, Turkey

Yalınkaya
- Village
- Location within Turkey
- Coordinates: 38.983°N 39.363°E
- Country: Turkey
- Province: Tunceli
- District: Pertek
- Population (2021): 64
- Time zone: UTC+3 (TRT)

Yalınkaya (Kurdish: Cêrxik) is a village in the Pertek District, Tunceli Province, Turkey. The village is populated by Kurds of the Pilvenk tribe and had a population of 64 in 2021.

The hamlets of Çamurluk and Karaveli are attached to the village.
