= Demirsaban, Pertek =

Village in Tunceli Province, Turkey

Demirsaban
- Village
- Location within Turkey
- Coordinates: 38.9340°N 39.2070°E
- Country: Turkey
- Province: Tunceli
- District: Pertek
- Population (2021): 82
- Time zone: UTC+3 (TRT)

Demirsaban (Kurdish: Zeverek) is a village in the Pertek District, Tunceli Province, Turkey. The village is populated by Kurds and had a population of 82 in 2021.

The hamlet of Altınküpe is attached to the village.
