= Aşağıdemirbük, Çemişgezek =

Village in Tunceli Province, Turkey

Aşağıdemirbük
- Village
- Location within Turkey
- Coordinates: 39.045°N 38.782°E
- Country: Turkey
- Province: Tunceli
- District: Çemişgezek
- Population (2021): 17
- Time zone: UTC+3 (TRT)

Aşağıdemirbük (also known as Aşağıvartenik) is a village in the Çemişgezek District, Tunceli Province, Turkey. The village is populated by Turks and had a population of 17 in 2021.

The hamlet of Bileç is attached to the village.
