= Yukarıbudak, Çemişgezek =

Village in Tunceli Province, Turkey

Yukarıbudak
- Village
- Location within Turkey
- Coordinates: 38.958°N 38.858°E
- Country: Turkey
- Province: Tunceli
- District: Çemişgezek
- Population (2021): 40
- Time zone: UTC+3 (TRT)

Yukarıbudak (Kurdish: Kurdkaravenk) is a village in the Çemişgezek District, Tunceli Province, Turkey. The village is populated by Kurds and had a population of 40 in 2021.
