= Dağyeli, Güçlükonak =

Village in Şırnak Province, Turkey

Dağyeli
- Village
- Location within Turkey
- Coordinates: 37.642°N 41.853°E
- Country: Turkey
- Province: Şırnak
- District: Güçlükonak
- Population (2021): 112
- Time zone: UTC+3 (TRT)

Dağyeli (Kurdish: Nêvya) is a village in the Güçlükonak District of Şırnak Province in Turkey. It is populated by Kurds of the Jilyan tribe and had a population of 112 in 2021.

The two hamlets of Çelik and Gümüşyaka are attached to Dağyeli.
