= Yatağankaya, Güçlükonak =

Village in Şırnak Province, Turkey

Yatağankaya
- Village
- Location within Turkey
- Coordinates: 37.533°N 41.935°E
- Country: Turkey
- Province: Şırnak
- District: Güçlükonak
- Population (2021): 54
- Time zone: UTC+3 (TRT)

Yatağankaya (Kurdish: Xaran) is a village in the Güçlükonak District of Şırnak Province in Turkey. It is populated by Kurds of the Şikakî tribe and had a population of 54 in 2021.
