= Beydamı, Pertek =

Village in Tunceli Province, Turkey

Beydamı
- Village
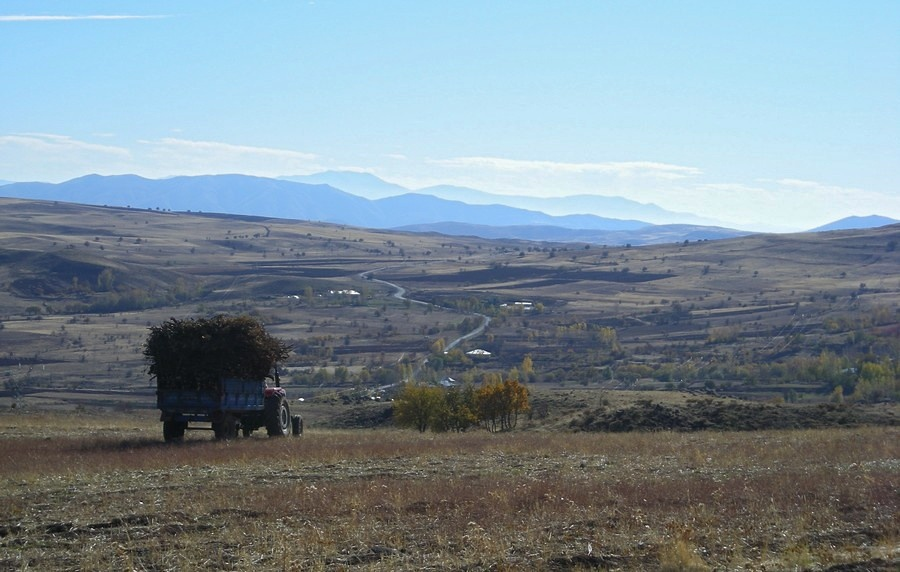

- Location within Turkey
- Coordinates: 38.951°N 39.466°E
- Country: Turkey
- Province: Tunceli
- District: Pertek
- Population (2021): 105
- Time zone: UTC+3 (TRT)

Beydamı (Kurdish: Balisêr) is a village in the Pertek District, Tunceli Province, Turkey. The village is populated by Kurds of the Pilvenk tribe and had a population of 105 in 2021.
