= Akdizgin, Güçlükonak =

Village in Şırnak Province, Turkey

Akdizgin
- Village
- Location within Turkey
- Coordinates: 37.443°N 42.000°E
- Country: Turkey
- Province: Şırnak
- District: Güçlükonak
- Population (2021): 368
- Time zone: UTC+3 (TRT)

Akdizgin (Kurdish: Zêvê) is a village in the Güçlükonak District of Şırnak Province in Turkey. It is populated by Kurds of the Welatî tribe and had a population of 368 in 2021.
