= Akçayunt, Çemişgezek =

Village in Tunceli Province, Turkey

Akçayunt
- Village
- Location within Turkey
- Coordinates: 39.1593°N 38.7744°E
- Country: Turkey
- Province: Tunceli
- District: Çemişgezek
- Population (2021): 33
- Time zone: UTC+3 (TRT)

Akçayunt (also known as Hozakpur) is a village in the Çemişgezek District, Tunceli Province, Turkey. The village is populated by Turks and had a population of 33 in 2021.
