= Yamaçoba, Pertek =

Village in Tunceli Province, Turkey

Yamaçoba
- Village
- Location within Turkey
- Coordinates: 39.0110°N 39.3242°E
- Country: Turkey
- Province: Tunceli
- District: Pertek
- Population (2021): 41
- Time zone: UTC+3 (TRT)

Yamaçoba (Kurdish: Yêrindag or Êrindag) is a village in the Pertek District, Tunceli Province, Turkey. The village is populated by Kurds of the Pilvenk tribe and had a population of 41 in 2021.

The hamlets of Havuz (Kurdish: Hewz), Çukurlu (Kurdish: Kort), Taht (Kurdish: Text) and Yayla (Kurdish: Ayle) are attached to the village.
