= Bakırlı, Pertek =

Village in Tunceli Province, Turkey

Bakırlı
- Village
- Location within Turkey
- Coordinates: 39.0269°N 39.3276°E
- Country: Turkey
- Province: Tunceli
- District: Pertek
- Population (2021): 41
- Time zone: UTC+3 (TRT)

Bakırlı (Kurdish: Şûşang) is a village in the Pertek District, Tunceli Province, Turkey. The village is populated by Kurds of the Pilvenk tribe and had a population of 41 in 2021.

The hamlets of Aşağınaçar and Yukarınaçar are attached to the village.
