= Ardıç, Pertek =

Village in Tunceli Province, Turkey

Ardıç
- Village
- Location within Turkey
- Coordinates: 38.9738°N 39.2827°E
- Country: Turkey
- Province: Tunceli
- District: Pertek
- Population (2021): 142
- Time zone: UTC+3 (TRT)

Ardıç (Kurdish: Saxmanê Dersimî) is a village in the Pertek District, Tunceli Province, Turkey. The village is populated by Kurds of the Ferhadan tribe and had a population of 142 in 2021.

The hamlets of Akdarı, Ekşiler, Fındıklı and Karşıbağ are attached to the village.
