= Gülbahçe, Çemişgezek =

Village in Tunceli Province, Turkey

Gülbahçe
- Village
- Location within Turkey
- Coordinates: 39.130°N 38.812°E
- Country: Turkey
- Province: Tunceli
- District: Çemişgezek
- Population (2021): 53
- Time zone: UTC+3 (TRT)

Gülbahçe (also known as Dimili) is a village in the Çemişgezek District, Tunceli Province, Turkey. The village is populated by Turks and had a population of 53 in 2021.
