= Erkalkan, Çemişgezek =

Village in Tunceli Province, Turkey

Erkalkan
- Village
- Location within Turkey
- Coordinates: 39.0815°N 38.7787°E
- Country: Turkey
- Province: Tunceli
- District: Çemişgezek
- Population (2021): 101
- Time zone: UTC+3 (TRT)

Erkalkan (also known as Sihnek) is a village in the Çemişgezek District, Tunceli Province, Turkey. The village is populated by Turks and had a population of 101 in 2021.

The hamlets of Çatalca, Çengel and Gemici are attached to the village.
