= Boyuncuk, Güçlükonak =

Village in Şırnak Province, Turkey

Boyuncuk
- Village
- Location within Turkey
- Coordinates: 37.427°N 41.909°E
- Country: Turkey
- Province: Şırnak
- District: Güçlükonak
- Population (2021): 870
- Time zone: UTC+3 (TRT)

Boyuncuk (Kurdish: Hetma) is a village in the Güçlükonak District of Şırnak Province in Turkey. It is populated by Kurds of the Harunan tribe and had a population of 870 in 2021.
