= Cihangir, Çemişgezek =

Village in Tunceli Province, Turkey

Cihangir
- Village
- Location within Turkey
- Coordinates: 39.201°N 38.808°E
- Country: Turkey
- Province: Tunceli
- District: Çemişgezek
- Population (2021): 40
- Time zone: UTC+3 (TRT)

Cihangir (also known as Kızı Ulaklı) is a village in the Çemişgezek District, Tunceli Province, Turkey. The village is populated by Turks and had a population of 40 in 2021.
