= Gözlüçayır, Çemişgezek =

Village in Tunceli Province, Turkey

Gözlüçayır
- Village
- Location within Turkey
- Coordinates: 39.118°N 38.975°E
- Country: Turkey
- Province: Tunceli
- District: Çemişgezek
- Population (2021): 108
- Time zone: UTC+3 (TRT)

Gözlüçayır (Kurdish: Ekrek) is a village in the Çemişgezek District, Tunceli Province, Turkey. The village is populated by Kurds and had a population of 108 in 2021.

The hamlets of Bağlıca and Vakıflar are attached to the village.
