= Karasar, Çemişgezek =

Village in Tunceli Province, Turkey

Karasar
- Village
- Location within Turkey
- Coordinates: 38.978°N 38.811°E
- Country: Turkey
- Province: Tunceli
- District: Çemişgezek
- Population (2021): 56
- Time zone: UTC+3 (TRT)

Karasar is a village in the Çemişgezek District, Tunceli Province, Turkey. The village is populated by Turks and had a population of 56 in 2021.
