= Dereli, Pertek =

Village in Tunceli Province, Turkey

Dereli
- Village
- Location within Turkey
- Coordinates: 38.885°N 39.310°E
- Country: Turkey
- Province: Tunceli
- District: Pertek
- Population (2021): 107
- Time zone: UTC+3 (TRT)

Dereli is a village in the Pertek District, Tunceli Province, Turkey. The village is populated by Kurds and Turks and had a population of 107 in 2021.

The hamlets of Akyurt, Hacıcemal and Karakuş are attached to the village.
