= Sürgüç, Pertek =

Village in Tunceli Province, Turkey

Sürgüç
- Village
- Location within Turkey
- Coordinates: 38.95488°N 39.34522°E
- Country: Turkey
- Province: Tunceli
- District: Pertek
- Population (2021): 69
- Time zone: UTC+3 (TRT)

Sürgüç (Kurdish: Surgiç) is a village in the Pertek District, Tunceli Province, Turkey. The village is populated by Kurds of the Pilvenk tribe and had a population of 69 in 2021.
