= Bozağaç, Çemişgezek =

Village in Tunceli Province, Turkey

Ulukale
- Village
- Location within Turkey
- Coordinates: 39.027°N 39.090°E
- Country: Turkey
- Province: Tunceli
- District: Çemişgezek
- Population (2021): 81
- Time zone: UTC+3 (TRT)

Bozağaç is a village in the Çemişgezek District, Tunceli Province, Turkey. The village is populated by Turks and had a population of 81 in 2021.

The hamlets of Hüngürlü and Keşiş are attached to the village.
