= Akçapınar, Çemişgezek =

Village in Tunceli Province, Turkey

Akçapınar
- Village
- Location within Turkey
- Coordinates: 38.948°N 38.944°E
- Country: Turkey
- Province: Tunceli
- District: Çemişgezek
- Population (2021): 280
- Time zone: UTC+3 (TRT)

Akçapınar (Kurdish: Vaskuvan) is a village in the Çemişgezek District, Tunceli Province, Turkey. The village is populated by Kurds and had a population of 280 in 2021.

The hamlets of Koyunardı, Mengöçek and Topluca are attached to the village. Koyunardı is populated by Turks.
