= Yeniköy, Pertek =

Village in Tunceli Province, Turkey

Yeniköy
- Village
- Location within Turkey
- Coordinates: 38.8977°N 39.4428°E
- Country: Turkey
- Province: Tunceli
- District: Pertek
- Population (2021): 137
- Time zone: UTC+3 (TRT)

Yeniköy (Kurdish: Qola Korde) is a village in the Pertek District, Tunceli Province, Turkey. The village is populated by Kurds of the Bermaz and Pilvenk tribes and had a population of 137 in 2021.

The hamlets of Akbayır and Beşpınar are attached to the village.
