= Damlabaşı, Güçlükonak =

Village in Şırnak Province, Turkey

Damlabaşı
- Village
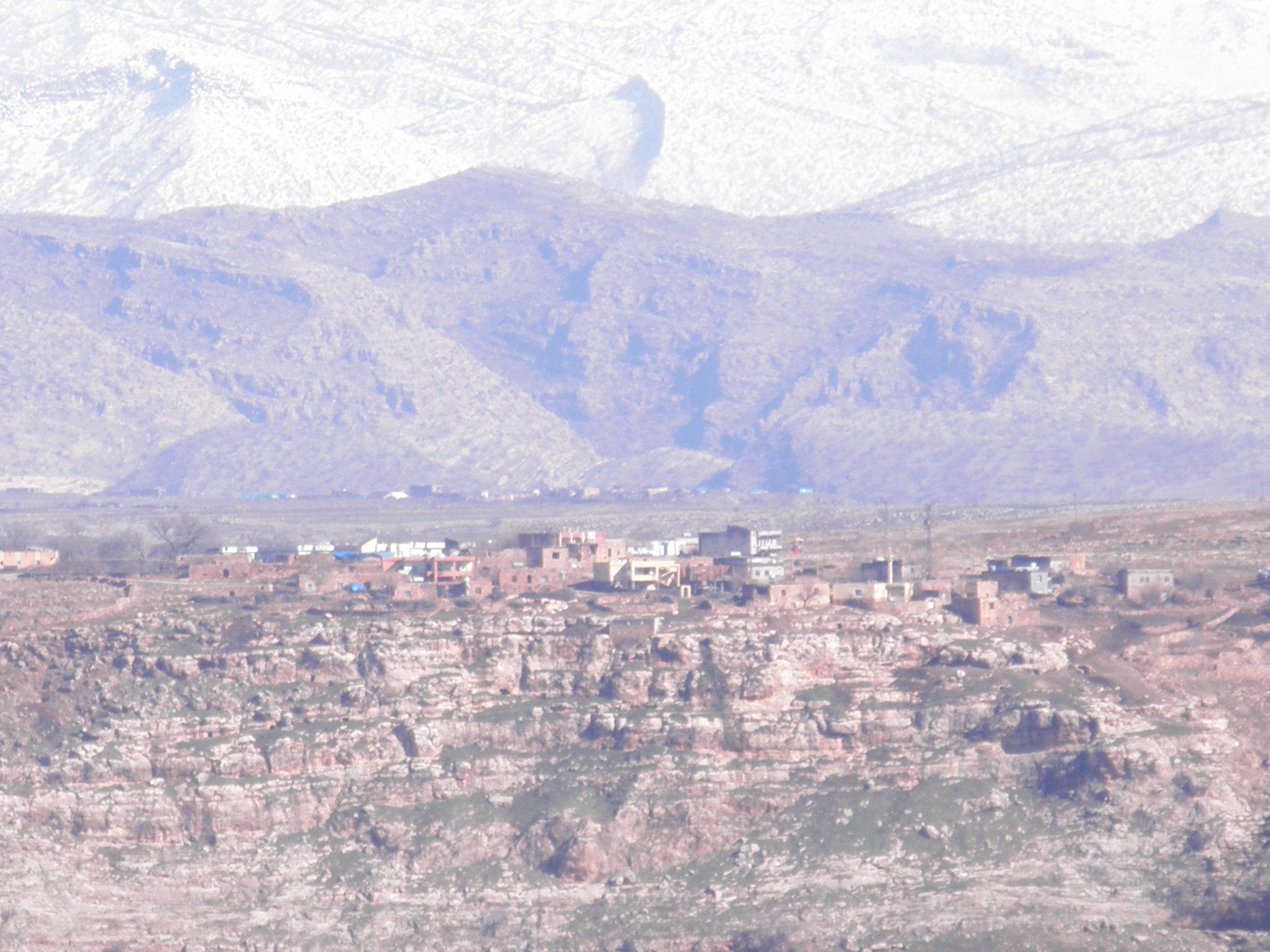
- Village

- Location within Turkey
- Coordinates: 37.479°N 41.872°E
- Country: Turkey
- Province: Şırnak
- District: Güçlükonak
- Population (2021): 416
- Time zone: UTC+3 (TRT)

Damlabaşı (Kurdish: Dilopkê) is a village in the Güçlükonak District of Şırnak Province in Turkey. The village is populated by Kurds of the Harunan tribe and had a population of 416 in 2021.
