= Kazılı, Pertek =

Village in Tunceli Province, Turkey

Kazılı
- Village
- Location within Turkey
- Coordinates: 38.9442°N 39.3350°E
- Country: Turkey
- Province: Tunceli
- District: Pertek
- Population (2021): 50
- Time zone: UTC+3 (TRT)

Kazılı (Kurdish: Qazelî) is a village in the Pertek District, Tunceli Province, Turkey. The village is populated by Kurds of the Pilvenk tribe and had a population of 50 in 2021.
