= Doğanalan, Çemişgezek =

Village in Tunceli Province, Turkey

Doğanalan
- Village
- Location within Turkey
- Coordinates: 39.176°N 38.799°E
- Country: Turkey
- Province: Tunceli
- District: Çemişgezek
- Population (2021): 35
- Time zone: UTC+3 (TRT)

Doğanalan (also known as Hemmeşe) is a village in the Çemişgezek District, Tunceli Province, Turkey. The village is populated by Turks and had a population of 35 in 2021.
