= Paşacık, Çemişgezek =

Village in Tunceli Province, Turkey

Paşacık
- Village
- Location within Turkey
- Coordinates: 39.083°N 38.970°E
- Country: Turkey
- Province: Tunceli
- District: Çemişgezek
- Population (2021): 217
- Time zone: UTC+3 (TRT)

Paşacık (Kurdish: Oskix) is a village in the Çemişgezek District, Tunceli Province, Turkey. The village is populated by Kurds of the Qoçan tribe and had a population of 217 in 2021.

The hamlet of Buğdaylı is attached to the village.
