= Bağsuyu, Çemişgezek =

Village in Tunceli Province, Turkey

Bağsuyu
- Village
- Location within Turkey
- Coordinates: 38.981°N 38.834°E
- Country: Turkey
- Province: Tunceli
- District: Çemişgezek
- Population (2021): 61
- Time zone: UTC+3 (TRT)

Bağsuyu (also known as Mahmunut) is a village in the Çemişgezek District, Tunceli Province, Turkey. The village is populated by Turks and had a population of 61 in 2021.
