= Pirinççi, Pertek =

Village in Tunceli Province, Turkey

Pirinççi
- Village
- Location within Turkey
- Coordinates: 38.900°N 39.549°E
- Country: Turkey
- Province: Tunceli
- District: Pertek
- Population (2021): 110
- Time zone: UTC+3 (TRT)

Pirinççi (Kurdish: Pirincî) is a village in the Pertek District, Tunceli Province, Turkey. The village is populated by Kurds of the Botikan tribe and had a population of 110 in 2021.

The hamlet of Ocaklı is attached to the village.
