= Tekeli, Çemişgezek =

Village in Tunceli Province, Turkey

Tekeli
- Village
- Location within Turkey
- Coordinates: 39.062°N 39.029°E
- Country: Turkey
- Province: Tunceli
- District: Çemişgezek
- Population (2021): 144
- Time zone: UTC+3 (TRT)

Tekeli (Kurdish: Birastik) is a village in the Çemişgezek District, Tunceli Province, Turkey. The village is populated by Kurds of the Qoçan tribe and had a population of 144 in 2021.
