= Sumak, Pertek =

Village in Tunceli Province, Turkey

Sumak
- Village
- Location within Turkey
- Coordinates: 38.887°N 39.518°E
- Country: Turkey
- Province: Tunceli
- District: Pertek
- Population (2021): 79
- Time zone: UTC+3 (TRT)

Sumak (Kurdish: Zimêq) is a village in the Pertek District, Tunceli Province, Turkey. The village is populated by Kurds of the Kurêşan tribe and had a population of 79 in 2021.
