= Çevrimli, Güçlükonak =

Village in Şırnak Province, Turkey

Çevrimli
- Village
- Location within Turkey
- Coordinates: 37.536°N 41.900°E
- Country: Turkey
- Province: Şırnak
- District: Güçlükonak
- Population (2021): 282
- Time zone: UTC+3 (TRT)

Çevrimli (Kurdish: Gerê) is a village in the Güçlükonak District of Şırnak Province in Turkey. The village is populated by Kurds of the Şikakî tribe and had a population of 282 in 2021.
