= Pertek =

Municipality in Tunceli Province, Turkey

- Municipality
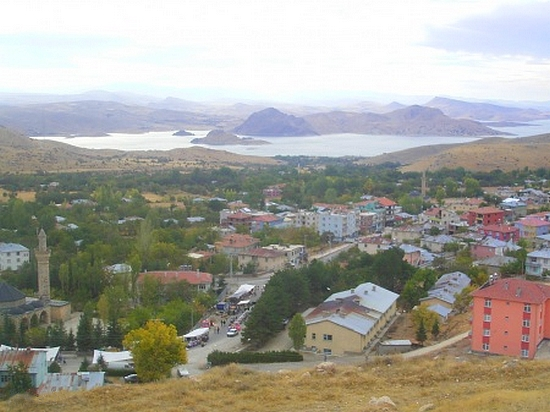
- View of Pertek, the 16th century Celebi Ali mosque is visible in the left of the image. Lake Keban is in the background.

- Logo

- Location within Turkey
- Coordinates: 38°52′01″N 39°19′30″E
- Country: Turkey
- Province: Tunceli
- District: Pertek

Government
  - Mayor: Recai Vural (AKP)
- Population (2021): 6,365
- Time zone: UTC+3 (TRT)
- Website: www.pertek.bel.tr

Pertek (Armenian: Բերդակ, romanized: Berdak; Kurdish: Pêrteg) is a town and seat of Pertek District in Tunceli Province, Turkey. It had a population of 6,365 in 2021 and is populated by Kurds and Turks. The mayor is Recai Vural from the Justice and Development Party (Turkey) (AKP).

The neighborhoods of the town are Camiikebir, Derebaşı, İstiklal, Kaledibi, Soğukpınar.

== History ==
The area of Pertek was ruled by different empires in its history. In the medieval period such as the Armenians and Byzantines before being taken over by different Islamic dynasties after the 11th century. Later it became part of the Ilkhanids and others and finally became part of the Ottoman Empire in the early 16th century.

During the Ottoman period Pertek was a hereditary Kurdish sanjak. The old town of Pertek (Eski Pertek) was located near the citadel but was abandoned in 1838 and moved to its current location. Armenian sources state that about 180 Armenians still lived in the old town (Eski Pertek) up until the early 1900s despite the rising water levels of the Euphrates river. After 1889, it was fully incorporated into the Mamuret-ul-Aziz Vilayet as a nahiye district of the Charsanjak kaza within the sanjak of Dersim.

According to the 1881 Ottoman census, there were 6 neighborhoods of Pertag town - 1154 total males (966 Muslim, 188 Armenian Apostolic) in 520 households. The general district had 23 villages of Pertag district - 127 total males (943 Muslim, 184 Armenian Apostolic) in 552 households. Females were often undercounted or entirely disregarded from census counts.

As a result of the construction of the Keban Dam, the Pertek district experienced the submerging of a number of its district's villages. Some of the settlements submerged were Eski Pertek, Borkin, Korluca (Til), Balan, Deşt, Zahuran, Beroç, Karameşe (Tezikan) [partially submerged], Tuzbaşı (Nisirto) [abandoned].

== Historic monuments ==
There are two historic Ottoman mosques in Pertek. The Baysungur mosque (16th century) and Celebi Ali mosque (16th century). The mosques were later dismantled and moved from the site of the old town to protect them from the rising water shore of the Lake Keban. The Pertek Castle is located on an Island. There are other historic sights in the nearby area. The village of Sağman has a ruined citadel with a 16th-century mosque, tomb and tekke built by the Kurdish sanjak bey Keykusrav.

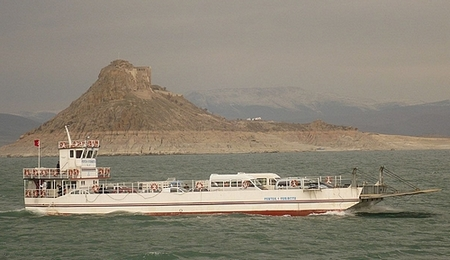
The Pertek Castle is located on an island since the building of the Keban Dam.

== Archaeology ==
In August 2022, archaeologists led by Kenan Öncel announced that they had discovered a child skeleton in an oval-shaped pit in Tozkoparan Mound. They also revealed terracotta potteries, obsidians, bones, stone tools and arrowheads. In order to determine the skeleton's diet and age-at-death, researchers are planning to trace the diseases left in the bones.
