= Günboğazı, Pertek =

Village in Tunceli Province, Turkey

Günboğazı
- Village
- Location within Turkey
- Coordinates: 38.961°N 39.441°E
- Country: Turkey
- Province: Tunceli
- District: Pertek
- Population (2021): 129
- Time zone: UTC+3 (TRT)

Günboğazı (Kurdish: Margik) is a village in the Pertek District, Tunceli Province, Turkey. The village is populated by Kurds and had a population of 129 in 2021.

The hamlet of Çevirme is attached to the village.
