= Kolankaya, Pertek =

Village in Tunceli Province, Turkey

Kolankaya
- Village
- Location within Turkey
- Coordinates: 38.8115°N 39.4119°E
- Country: Turkey
- Province: Tunceli
- District: Pertek
- Population (2021): 29
- Time zone: UTC+3 (TRT)

Kolankaya (Kurdish: Kawê) is a village in the Pertek District, Tunceli Province, Turkey. The village is populated by Kurds and had a population of 29 in 2021.

The hamlets of Bağören, Damlapınar, Doluca, Edincik, Işıklar and Kabasakal are attached to the village.
