= Arpaderen, Çemişgezek =

Village in Tunceli Province, Turkey

Arpaderen
- Village
- Location within Turkey
- Coordinates: 39.013°N 38.859°E
- Country: Turkey
- Province: Tunceli
- District: Çemişgezek
- Population (2021): 75
- Time zone: UTC+3 (TRT)

Arpaderen (Kurdish: Biradî) is a village in the Çemişgezek District, Tunceli Province, Turkey. The village is populated by Kurds of the Qoçan tribe and had a population of 75 in 2021.

The hamlet of Doruk is attached to the village.
