= Sarıbalta, Çemişgezek =

Village in Tunceli Province, Turkey

Sarıbalta
- Village
- Location within Turkey
- Coordinates: 39.001°N 38.946°E
- Country: Turkey
- Province: Tunceli
- District: Çemişgezek
- Population (2021): 513
- Time zone: UTC+3 (TRT)

Sarıbalta (Kurdish: Komer) is a village in the Çemişgezek District, Tunceli Province, Turkey, populated by 513 Kurds of the Şikakî tribe in 2021 and attached to the hamlet of Komşular.
