= Geçityaka, Pertek =

Village in Tunceli Province, Turkey

Geçityaka
- Village
- Location within Turkey
- Coordinates: 38.892°N 39.213°E
- Country: Turkey
- Province: Tunceli
- District: Pertek
- Population (2021): 146
- Time zone: UTC+3 (TRT)

Geçityaka (Kurdish: Balan) is a village in the Pertek District, Tunceli Province, Turkey. The village is populated by Kurds and had a population of 146 in 2021.

The hamlets of Hasır, Karşıyaka and Sürmecik are attached to the village.
