= Elmakaşı, Pertek =

Village in Tunceli Province, Turkey

Elmakaşı
- Village
- Location within Turkey
- Coordinates: 38.964°N 39.359°E
- Country: Turkey
- Province: Tunceli
- District: Pertek
- Population (2021): 93
- Time zone: UTC+3 (TRT)

Elmakaşı (Kurdish: Poxterîs) is a village in the Pertek District, Tunceli Province, Turkey. The village is populated by Kurds of the Pilvenk tribe and had a population of 93 in 2021.

The hamlet of Yeşilkaya is attached to the village.
