= Pınarlar, Pertek =

Village in Tunceli Province, Turkey

Pınarlar
- Village
- Location within Turkey
- Coordinates: 38.8738°N 39.4724°E
- Country: Turkey
- Province: Tunceli
- District: Pertek
- Population (2021): 321
- Time zone: UTC+3 (TRT)

Pınarlar (Kurdish: Paxşang) is a village in the Pertek District, Tunceli Province, Turkey. The village is populated by Kurds of the Bermaz tribe and had a population of 321 in 2021.

The hamlets of Adıgüzel, Göztepe and Taşbalta are attached to the village.
