= Korluca, Pertek =

Village in Tunceli Province, Turkey

Korluca
- Village
- Location within Turkey
- Coordinates: 38.8299°N 39.3214°E
- Country: Turkey
- Province: Tunceli
- District: Pertek
- Population (2021): 47
- Time zone: UTC+3 (TRT)

Korluca (Kurdish: Til) is a village in the Pertek District, Tunceli Province, Turkey. The village is populated by Kurds and Turks and had a population of 47 in 2021.
