= Fındık, Güçlükonak =

Municipality in Şırnak Province, Turkey

Fındık
- Municipality
- Location in Turkey
- Coordinates: 37.513°N 41.971°E
- Country: Turkey
- Province: Şırnak
- District: Güçlükonak
- Population (2021): 2,147
- Time zone: UTC+3 (TRT)

Fındık (Kurdish: Findik) is a town (belde) and municipality in the Güçlükonak District of Şırnak Province in Turkey. It is populated by Kurds of the Harunan and Jilyan tribes and had a population of 2,147 in 2021.

The settlement of Gümüşyazı (Sewadî) is attached to Fındık.
