= Demirboğaz, Güçlükonak =

Municipality in Şırnak Province, Turkey

Demirboğaz
- Village
- Location within Turkey
- Coordinates: 37.634°N 41.911°E
- Country: Turkey
- Province: Şırnak
- District: Güçlükonak
- Population (2021): 6
- Time zone: UTC+3 (TRT)

Demirboğaz (Kurdish: Kerxar) is a village in the Güçlükonak District of Şırnak Province in Turkey. It is populated by Kurds of the Jilyan tribe and had a population of 6 in 2021.
