= Güçlükonak District =

District in Şırnak Province, Turkey

- District
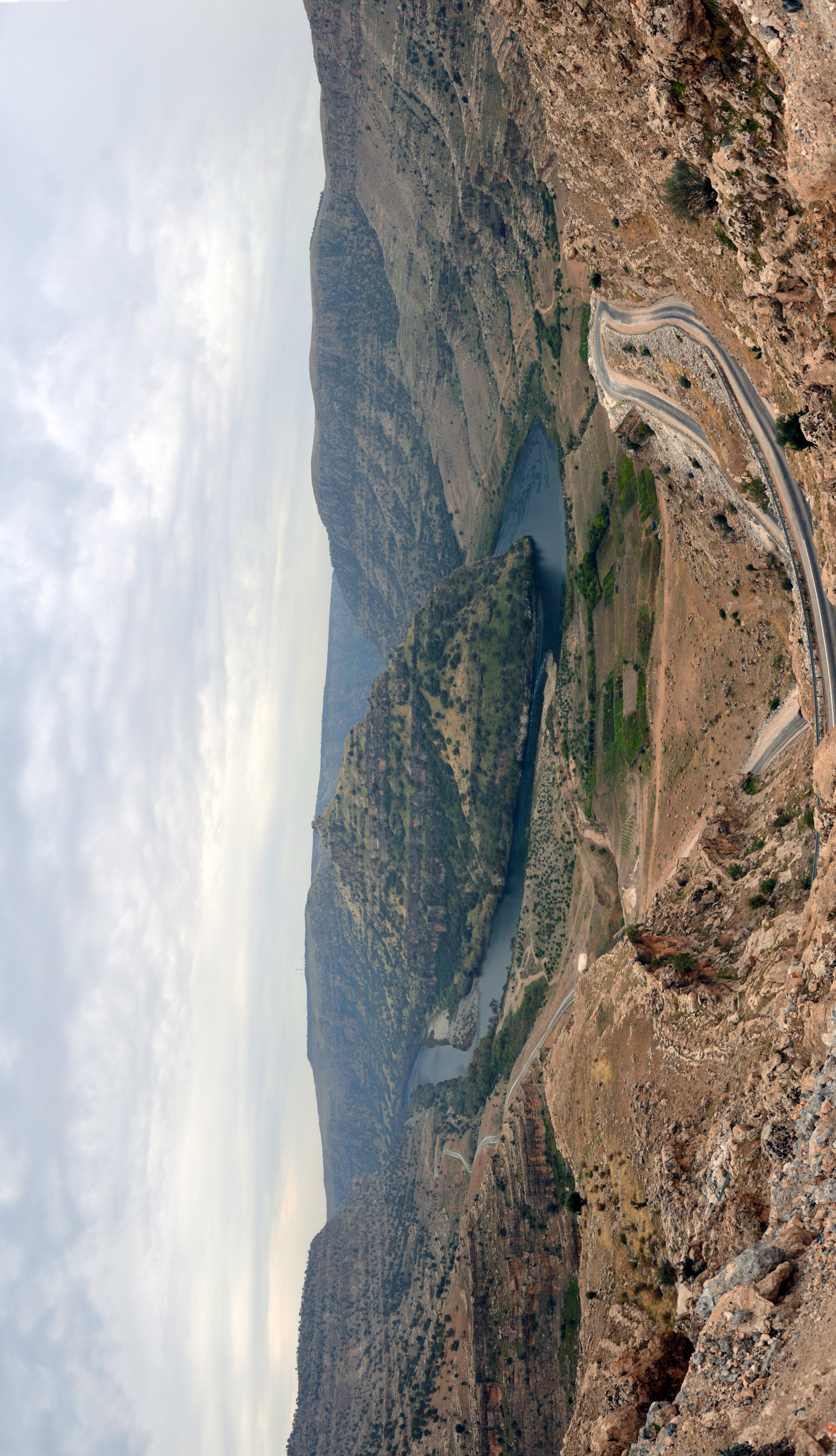

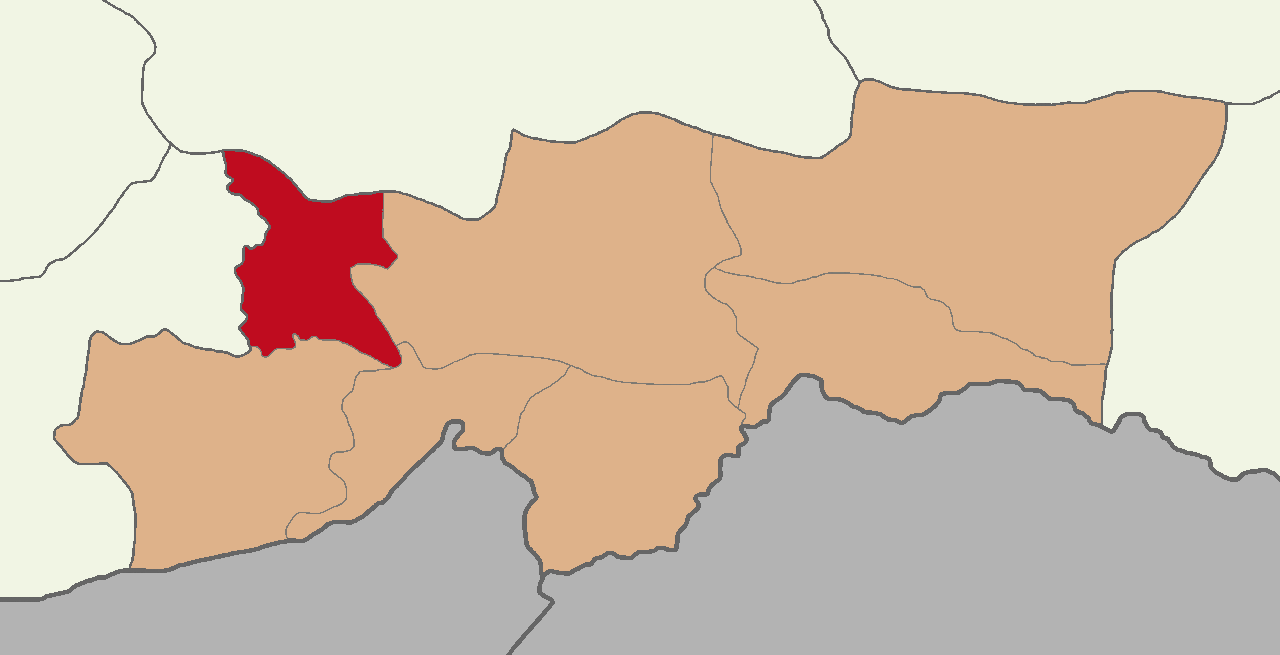
- Map showing Güçlükonak District in Şırnak Province

- Location within Turkey
- Coordinates: 37°32′N 41°57′E
- Country: Turkey
- Province: Şırnak
- Seat: Güçlükonak
- Area: 466 km^{2} (180 sq mi)
- Population (2021): 11,915
  - Density: 25.6/km^{2} (66.2/sq mi)
- Time zone: UTC+3 (TRT)

Güçlükonak District is a district of the Şırnak Province of Turkey. In 2021, the district had a population of 11,915. The seat of the district is the town of Güçlükonak. Its area is 466 km^{2}.

The district was part of Siirt Province until it was attached to Şırnak Province in 1990.

== Settlements ==
Güçlükonak District contains two beldes, twenty-five villages, of which six are unpopulated, and moreover ten hamlets.

=== Beldes ===
1. Güçlükonak (Basan)
2. Fındık (Findikê)

=== Villages ===
1. Ağaçyurdu (Zivinga Şikakan)
2. Akçakuşak (Şikefta Spî)
3. Akdizgin (Zêvê)
4. Boyuncuk (Hetma)
5. Bulmuşlar (Xurs)
6. Çetinkaya (Guyîna)
7. Çevrimli (Gêrê)
8. Çobankazanı (Şehka)
9. Dağyeli (Nevyan)
10. Damlabaşı (Dilopkê)
11. Damlarca (Keraşa)
12. Demirboğaz (Gerger)
13. Düğünyurdu (Tarunî)
14. Erdurdu (Şikefta Îsîva)
15. Eskiyapı (Finik)
16. Kırkağaç (Avên, Bênat)
17. Koçtepe (Hista)
18. Ormaniçi (Bana)
19. Özbaşoğlu (Hirariş)
20. Sağkol (Kehnîya Hêjîrê)
21. Taşkonak (Şikeftiyan)
22. Yağızoymak (Zivinge)
23. Yağmurkuyusu (Cêleka)
24. Yatağankaya (Xoran)
25. Yenidemir (Bînûsra)
