= Yünbüken, Çemişgezek =

Village in Tunceli Province, Turkey

Yünbüken
- Village
- Location within Turkey
- Coordinates: 39.023°N 38.814°E
- Country: Turkey
- Province: Tunceli
- District: Çemişgezek
- Population (2021): 52
- Time zone: UTC+3 (TRT)

Yünbüken (also known as Germisik) is a village in the Çemişgezek District, Tunceli Province, Turkey. The village had a population of 52 in 2021.

The hamlet of İncesu is attached to the village.
