= Cebe, Çemişgezek =

Village in Tunceli Province, Turkey

Cebe
- Village
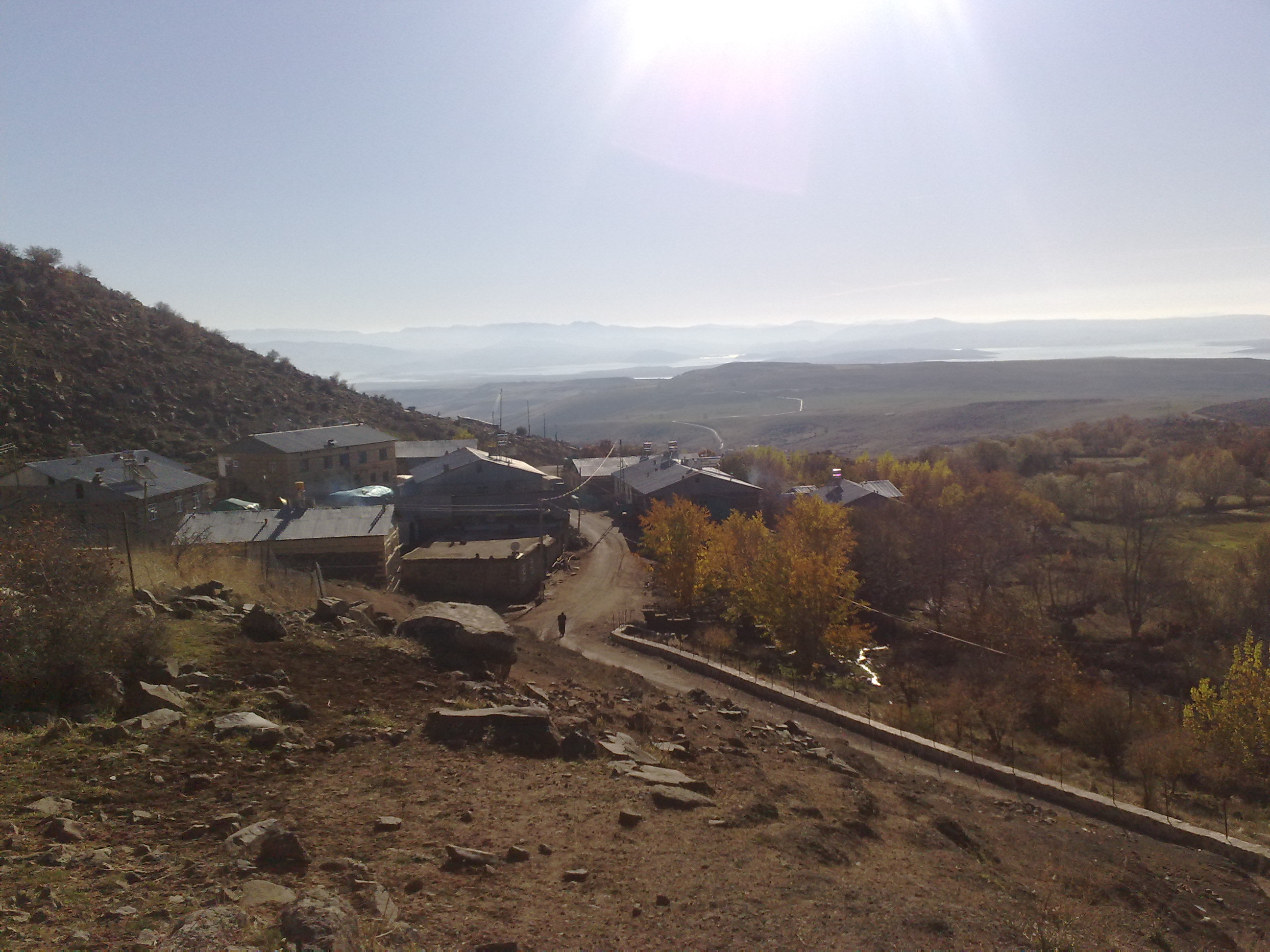

- Location within Turkey
- Coordinates: 39.042°N 38.836°E
- Country: Turkey
- Province: Tunceli
- District: Çemişgezek
- Population (2021): 270
- Time zone: UTC+3 (TRT)

Cebe (also known as Pazapun) is a village in the Çemişgezek District, Tunceli Province, Turkey. The village is populated by Turks and had a population of 270 in 2021.

The hamlet of Gözecik is attached to the village.
