= Konurat, Pertek =

Village in Tunceli Province, Turkey

Konurat
- Village
- Location within Turkey
- Coordinates: 38.8198°N 39.5189°E
- Country: Turkey
- Province: Tunceli
- District: Pertek
- Population (2021): 24
- Time zone: UTC+3 (TRT)

Konurat (Kurdish: Xaxî) is a village in the Pertek District, Tunceli Province, Turkey. The village is populated by Kurds and had a population of 24 in 2021.

The hamlets of Gökbudak and Karaman are attached to the village.
