= Biçmekaya, Pertek =

Village in Tunceli Province, Turkey

Biçmekaya
- Village
- Location within Turkey
- Coordinates: 38.879°N 39.506°E
- Country: Turkey
- Province: Tunceli
- District: Pertek
- Population (2021): 69
- Time zone: UTC+3 (TRT)

Biçmekaya (Kurdish: Xarseng) is a village in the Pertek District, Tunceli Province, Turkey. The village is populated by Kurds of the Bermaz tribe and has a population of 69 in 2021.

The hamlet of Salınker is attached to the village.
