= Dedebeyli, Çemişgezek =

Village in Tunceli Province, Turkey

Dedebeyli
- Village
- Location within Turkey
- Coordinates: 39.133°N 38.774°E
- Country: Turkey
- Province: Tunceli
- District: Çemişgezek
- Population (2021): 32
- Time zone: UTC+3 (TRT)

Dedebeyli (also known as Venk) is a village in the Çemişgezek District, Tunceli Province, Turkey. The village is populated by Turks and had a population of 32 in 2021.
