= Karagüney, Pertek =

Village in Tunceli Province, Turkey

Karagüney
- Village
- Location within Turkey
- Coordinates: 38.887°N 39.573°E
- Country: Turkey
- Province: Tunceli
- District: Pertek
- Population (2021): 105
- Time zone: UTC+3 (TRT)

Karagüney (Kurdish: Gados) is a village in the Pertek District, Tunceli Province, Turkey. The village is populated by Kurds and had a population of 105 in 2021.

The hamlets of Kalender, Karameşe, Sarıpınar and Şamlı are attached to the village.
