= Kacarlar, Pertek =

Village in Tunceli Province, Turkey

Kacarlar
- Village
- Location within Turkey
- Coordinates: 38.941°N 39.508°E
- Country: Turkey
- Province: Tunceli
- District: Pertek
- Population (2021): 97
- Time zone: UTC+3 (TRT)

Kacarlar (Kurdish: Qeceran) is a village in the Pertek District, Tunceli Province, Turkey. The village is populated by Kurds of the Maskan tribe and had a population of 97 in 2021.

The hamlet of Aşağıkacar is attached to the village.
