= Çalıözü, Pertek =

Village in Tunceli Province, Turkey

Çalıözü
- Village
- Location within Turkey
- Coordinates: 38.8631°N 39.5458°E
- Country: Turkey
- Province: Tunceli
- District: Pertek
- Population (2021): 77
- Time zone: UTC+3 (TRT)

Çalıözü (Kurdish: Vasgert) is a village in the Pertek District, Tunceli Province, Turkey. The village is populated by Kurds and had a population of 77 in 2021.

The hamlets of Demirbaş and Dolamaç are attached to the village.
