= Güneybaşı, Çemişgezek =

Village in Tunceli Province, Turkey

Güneybaşı
- Village
- Location within Turkey
- Coordinates: 39.116°N 38.822°E
- Country: Turkey
- Province: Tunceli
- District: Çemişgezek
- Population (2021): 32
- Time zone: UTC+3 (TRT)

Güneybaşı (also known as Setirge) is a village in the Çemişgezek District, Tunceli Province, Turkey. The village is populated by Turks and had a population of 32 in 2021.
