= Taşkonak, Güçlükonak =

Village in Şırnak Province, Turkey

Taşkonak
- Village
- Location within Turkey
- Coordinates: 37.618°N 41.896°E
- Country: Turkey
- Province: Şırnak
- District: Güçlükonak
- Population (2021): 13
- Time zone: UTC+3 (TRT)

Taşkonak (Kurdish: Şikeftya) is a village in the Güçlükonak District of Şırnak Province in Turkey. It is populated by Kurds of the Jilyan tribe and had a population of 13 in 2021.

The hamlet of Çanaklı is attached to Taşkonak.
