= Büyükörence, Çemişgezek =

Village in Tunceli Province, Turkey

Büyükörence
- Village
- Location within Turkey
- Coordinates: 38.996°N 38.843°E
- Country: Turkey
- Province: Tunceli
- District: Çemişgezek
- Population (2021): 97
- Time zone: UTC+3 (TRT)

Büyükörence is a village in the Çemişgezek District, Tunceli Province, Turkey. The village is populated by Turks and had a population of 97 in 2021.

The hamlets of Azizli, Küçükörence, Mukaddim and Savuk are attached to the village.
