= Dere, Pertek =

Village in Tunceli Province, Turkey

Dere
- Village
- Location within Turkey
- Coordinates: 38.9896°N 39.3088°E
- Country: Turkey
- Province: Tunceli
- District: Pertek
- Population (2021): 75
- Time zone: UTC+3 (TRT)

Dere (Kurdish: Rumkix) is a village in the Pertek District, Tunceli Province, Turkey. The village is populated by Kurds of the Pilvenk tribe and had a population of 75 in 2021.

The hamlets of Aşağıçay, Değirmendere, Karabulut and Sulumezraa are attached to the village.
