= Tozkoparan, Pertek =

Village in Tunceli Province, Turkey

Tozkoparan
- Village
- Location within Turkey
- Coordinates: 38.929°N 39.438°E
- Country: Turkey
- Province: Tunceli
- District: Pertek
- Population (2021): 165
- Time zone: UTC+3 (TRT)

Tozkoparan (Kurdish: Tanz) is a village in the Pertek District, Tunceli Province, Turkey. The village is populated by Kurds and had a population of 165 in 2021.
