= Damlarca, Güçlükonak =

Village in Şırnak Province, Turkey

Damlarca
- Village
- Location within Turkey
- Coordinates: 37.409°N 42.067°E
- Country: Turkey
- Province: Şırnak
- District: Güçlükonak
- Population (2021): 157
- Time zone: UTC+3 (TRT)

Damlarca (Kurdish: Keraşa; Syriac: Fendekī) (Note: Also known as Finikiravi, Finikravi, or Fénék.) is a village in the Güçlükonak District of Şırnak Province in Turkey. It is populated by Kurds of the Welatî tribe and had a population of 157 in 2021.

The hamlet of Darıca is attached to the village.

== History ==
Fendekī (today called Damlarca) was historically inhabited by Syriac Orthodox Christians. In the Syriac Orthodox patriarchal register of dues of 1870, it was recorded that the village had 16 households, who paid 46 dues, and it did not have a church or a priest. It was located in the Cizre kaza in the Mardin sanjak in the Diyarbekir vilayet in c. 1900. It is tentatively identified with the village of Fénék, which was populated by 400 Syriacs in 1914, according to the list presented to the Paris Peace Conference by the Assyro-Chaldean delegation.

== Bibliography ==
- Baz, Ibrahim (2016). Şırnak aşiretleri ve kültürü (in Turkish). ISBN 9786058849631.
- Bcheiry, Iskandar (2009). The Syriac Orthodox Patriarchal Register of Dues of 1870: An Unpublished Historical Document from the Late Ottoman Period. Gorgias Press.
- Gaunt, David (2006). Massacres, Resistance, Protectors: Muslim-Christian Relations in Eastern Anatolia during World War I. Gorgias Press.
- Jongerden, Joost; Verheij, Jelle, eds. (2012). Social Relations in Ottoman Diyarbekir, 1870-1915. Brill.
