= Ulukale, Çemişgezek =

Village in Tunceli Province, Turkey

Ulukale
- Village
- Location within Turkey
- Coordinates: 39.025°N 39.036°E
- Country: Turkey
- Province: Tunceli
- District: Çemişgezek
- Population (2021): 325
- Time zone: UTC+3 (TRT)

Ulukale is a village in the Çemişgezek District, Tunceli Province, Turkey. The village is populated by Turks and had a population of 325 in 2021.

The hamlets of Aşağıbayır, Cevizlidere, Çaybağı, Yukarıbayır (Yukarıpeydere) and Yünlü are attached to the village. Yukarıbayır is populated by Kurds of the Qoçan tribe.
