= Yukarıyakabaşı, Pertek =

Village in Tunceli Province, Turkey

Yukarıyakabaşı
- Village
- Location within Turkey
- Coordinates: 38.8468°N 39.4698°E
- Country: Turkey
- Province: Tunceli
- District: Pertek
- Population (2021): 40
- Time zone: UTC+3 (TRT)

Yukarıyakabaşı (Kurdish: Horig) is a village in the Pertek District, Tunceli Province, Turkey. The village is populated by Kurds of the Bermaz tribe and had a population of 40 in 2021.

The hamlets of Ağacan and Bölmeli are attached to the village.
