= Koçtepe, Güçlükonak =

Village in Şırnak Province, Turkey

Koçtepe
- Village
- Location within Turkey
- Coordinates: 37.533°N 41.879°E
- Country: Turkey
- Province: Şırnak
- District: Güçlükonak
- Population (2021): 757
- Time zone: UTC+3 (TRT)

Koçtepe (Kurdish: Xestê) is a village in the Güçlükonak District of Şırnak Province in Turkey. It is populated by Kurds of the Şikakî tribe and had a population of 757 in 2021.

The hamet of Koçyurdu is attached to Koçtepe.
