= Kayabağ, Pertek =

Village in Tunceli Province, Turkey

Kayabağ
- Village
- Location within Turkey
- Coordinates: 38.996°N 39.365°E
- Country: Turkey
- Province: Tunceli
- District: Pertek
- Population (2021): 73
- Time zone: UTC+3 (TRT)

Kayabağ (Kurdish: Axzunik) is a village in the Pertek District, Tunceli Province, Turkey. The village is populated by Kurds of the Pilvenk tribe and had a population of 73 in 2021.

The hamlets of Bozdoğan and Elecik are attached to the village.
