= Çataksu, Pertek =

Village in Tunceli Province, Turkey

Çataksu
- Village
- Location within Turkey
- Coordinates: 38°46′46″N 39°29′53″E
- Country: Turkey
- Province: Tunceli
- District: Pertek
- Population (2021): 66
- Time zone: UTC+3 (TRT)

Çataksu (Kurdish: Avdan) is a village in the Pertek District, Tunceli Province, Turkey. The village is populated by Kurds and Turks and had a population of 66 in 2021.

The hamlets of Aşağıyakabaşı, Günyüzü and Köçek are attached to the village.
