= Akçakuşak, Güçlükonak =

Village in Şırnak Province, Turkey

Akçakuşak
- Village
- Location within Turkey
- Coordinates: 37.503°N 41.885°E
- Country: Turkey
- Province: Şırnak
- District: Güçlükonak
- Population (2021): 582
- Time zone: UTC+3 (TRT)

Akçakuşak (Kurdish: Şikefta Spî) is a village in the Güçlükonak District of Şırnak Province in Turkey. It is populated by Kurds of the Harunan tribe and had a population of 582 in 2021.
