= Pertek Castle =

Castle in Turkey

- Pertek, Tunceli Province
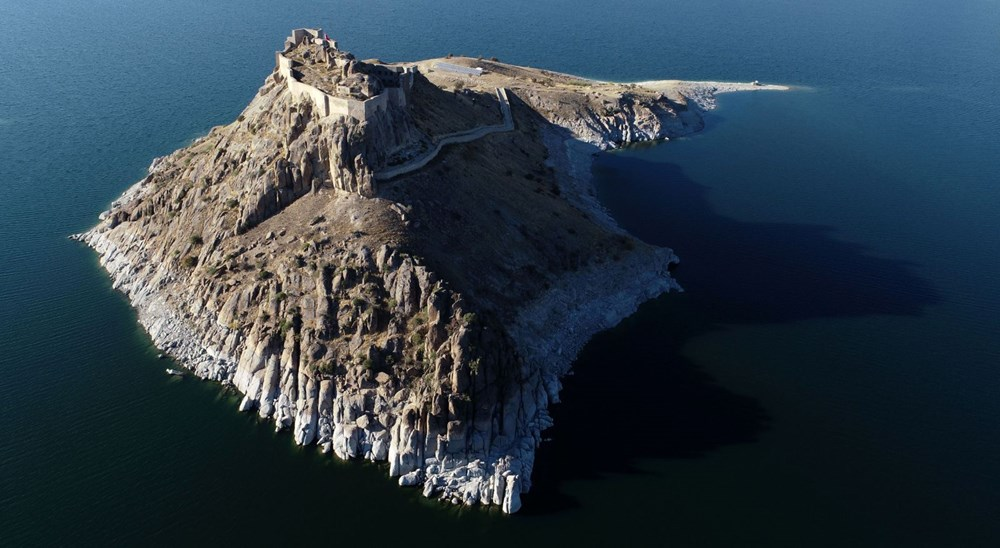

Site information
- Type: Fortress

Location
- Coordinates: 38.844°N 39.271°E
- Height: 873 m

Site history
- Built: 11th century
- Built by: Mengujekids
- Materials: Ashlar, brick and tile

Pertek Castle (Turkish: Pertek Kalesi) is a castle in the Pertek district of the Tunceli Province in Turkey.

Its origins probably lie in the Kingdom of Urartu. According to the Italian archaeologist Roberto Dan, the castle exhibits characteristics of Urartu rock processing and was built for the control of nearby mines, especially copper mines. The name Pertek comes from the Armenian word Բերդակ (Berdak) in the local dialect, a diminutive of բերդ (berd, “fortress”).

The current structure was built in the 11th century by the Seljukid Mengujekids beys. Under the Ottoman Empire it was restored and rebuilt, probably in the 16th century, at the same time as the Sungur Bey Mosque and Çelebi Ağa Mosque in Pertek.

Originally, the castle overlooked Old Pertek. In 1974, the surrounding area was flooded by the Keban Dam, leaving the castle on an island five kilometers away from the northern shore of the new artificial lake. It is close to the boundary of the Elazığ Province.

The castle's walls are completely made of natural stone blocks. In the southern walls, clinker and blue tiles were also used. There is an entrance in the northwest, and cisterns along with two defensive walls in the castle. According to Evliya Çelebi, the castle hosted a sculpture of an eagle. Below the castle, the Baysungur Mosque and the Çelebi Ali Mosque, built by Baysungur, the bey of Pertek, were located.
