= Shekak (tribe) =

Kurdish tribe

The Shekak or Shakkak (Kurdish: شکاک, romanized: Şikak) is a Kurdish tribe present in various regions, mainly in West Azerbaijan province, Iran.

== History ==
The Shikaki tribe are first mentioned in a Yazidi mişûr (manuscript) from 1207/1208 AD, as one of the tribes affiliated to Pir Sini Darani, who is a Yazidi saint represented in the Yazidi religion as the Lord of the Sea.

In the Sharafnama, they are mentioned twice. First, in the chapter on the emirate of Bohtan, as being one of the four tribes living in Hakkâri. Second, in the chapter on the Ayyubid emirate of Hasankeyf.

In a 16th-century Ottoman Defter, they are mentioned in the regions of Birecik, Kahta, Joum, Suruç and Ravendan, and called 'Taife-I Ekrâd-I Shikakî'. In another Defter, they are mentioned in the region of Çemişgezek.

Among the clans of the Shekak are the 'Awdoǐ or Evdoyî. According to their oral history they came from Diyarbakır in the 17th century and settled west of Lake Urmia, which displaced the Donboli tribe. Edward Balfour mentioned the Shekak as a Lak tribe of Iranian Azerbaijan numbering 15,000 tents in the 19th century.

The first known chieftain of the 'Awdoǐ was Ismail Agha, a Kurdish chieftain who supported Agha Mohammad Khan Qajar in his conquests. Ismail Agha died in 1816 and his tomb is located beside the Naslu River. His grandson Jafar Agha was executed by the Qajar authorities as a bandit in Tabriz in 1905. Jafar's brother Simko Shikak then began a rebellion against Qajar Iran with support from the Ottoman Empire. He was responsible for leading the massacres against Assyrians and Azerbaijanis in the area before and during World War I, and for the organised resistance against the regime of Reza Shah which eventually led to his death in 1930.

The Shekak tribe has been described as brave warriors and they trained officers of soldiers of the Qajar dynasty since the reign of Agha Mohammad Khan Qajar.

== Spread ==
The tribe inhabits the villages of Akçakuşak, Çevrimli, Düğünyurdu, Koçtepe and Yatağankaya in the Şırnak Province of Turkey. It moreover inhabits multiple villages in Tunceli Province.

Turkic-speaking Shia portions of the tribe historically inhabited several pockets in East Azerbaijan province.

The Shekaks encompass the lands stretching from the village of Biyan in the north, to Amkan in the west, Cûmê in the south, and Ezaz in the east. By 1993, there were a total of 39 villages under Shikak dominance in the Afrin region.

== Notable people ==
- Ismail Agha (d. 1816 or 1820)
- Mîr Alî Agha
- Mehmed Agha
- Timur (Teymûr) Agha
- Jafar Agha (d. 1905)
- Simko Agha (b. 1887 d. 1930)
- Amar Khan (b. 1873 d. 1958)

== See also ==
- Iranian Kurdistan
- List of Iranian Kurds
