= Gorkhmaz Eyvazov =

Azerbaijani military officer and politician

- Native name: Qorxmaz Abış oğlu Eyvazov
- Born: Gorkhmaz Abysh oglu Eyvazov; April 1, 1967; Güləbird, Lachin District, Azerbaijani SSR, Soviet Union
- Died: February 10, 1994 (aged 26) Çocuq Mərcanlı, Jabrayil District, Azerbaijan
- Buried: Sumgayit
- Allegiance: Red Army (1985–1988); Azerbaijani Armed Forces (1991–1994)
- Branch: Soviet Army (1985–1988); Internal Troops of Azerbaijan (1991–1994)
- Service years: 1985–1994
- Rank: Company commander (in 1994)
- Conflicts: First Nagorno-Karabakh War: Battle of Lachin; Operation Horadiz
- Children: 2

Gorkhmaz Abysh oglu Eyvazov (Azerbaijani: Qorxmaz Abış oğlu Eyvazov; born 1 April 1967) was an Azerbaijani policeman, foreman of the Internal Troops of the Ministry of Internal Affairs of Azerbaijan, participant of the First Nagorno-Karabakh War, National Hero of Azerbaijan.

== Early life ==
Gorkhmaz Eyvazov was born on 1 April 1967, in Güləbird, Lachin District of the Azerbaijani SSR, then the Soviet Union. In 1974, he went to the first grade of the school in his native village. In 1984, Eyvazov graduated from the secondary school in Güləbird and entered the technical vocational school No. 127 of Lachin District. In 1985, Eyvazov was drafted into the ranks of the Red Army. During his military service in the Ukrainian SSR, he graduated from a six-month sergeant course. Over the years, Eyvazov was awarded certificates of honor, as well as an athlete's certificate of the first category and a breastplate. In 1987, he graduated from the army and returned to his native village.

== First Nagorno-Karabakh War ==
In 1988, with the beginning of the Nagorno-Karabakh conflict, Eyvazov joined a partisan detachment created in Lachin District. In March 1992, Eyvazov was accepted to Lachin District Police Department. During the First Nagorno-Karabakh War, as an ordinary police officer, he took part in the battles for Qazıdərə, Suarası, and Mazutlu, all situated in his native Lachin District. His squad also managed to capture an Armenian tank during the clashes in Mount Qızartı. On 4 August 1992, the Armenian forces attempted to take the mount, and Eyvazov was wounded in his arm. Having recovered, Eyvazov returned to the front again and fought Fuzuli District. During Operation Horadiz in early 1994, he was appointed company commander. On 10 February 1994, Eyvazov killed several dozen Armenian servicemen during the battle for Cocuq Mərcanlı, but he was killed during the battle.

At the time of his death, he was married and was a father of two. He was buried in the Martyrs' Lane in Sumgayit. Gorkhmaz Eyvazov, with the Decree of the President of Azerbaijan, Heydar Aliyev, numbered 262 and dated 15 January 1995, was posthumously awarded the title of National Hero of Azerbaijan.
