= Bəylik, Lachin =

Village in Lachin District, Azerbaijan

Bəylik
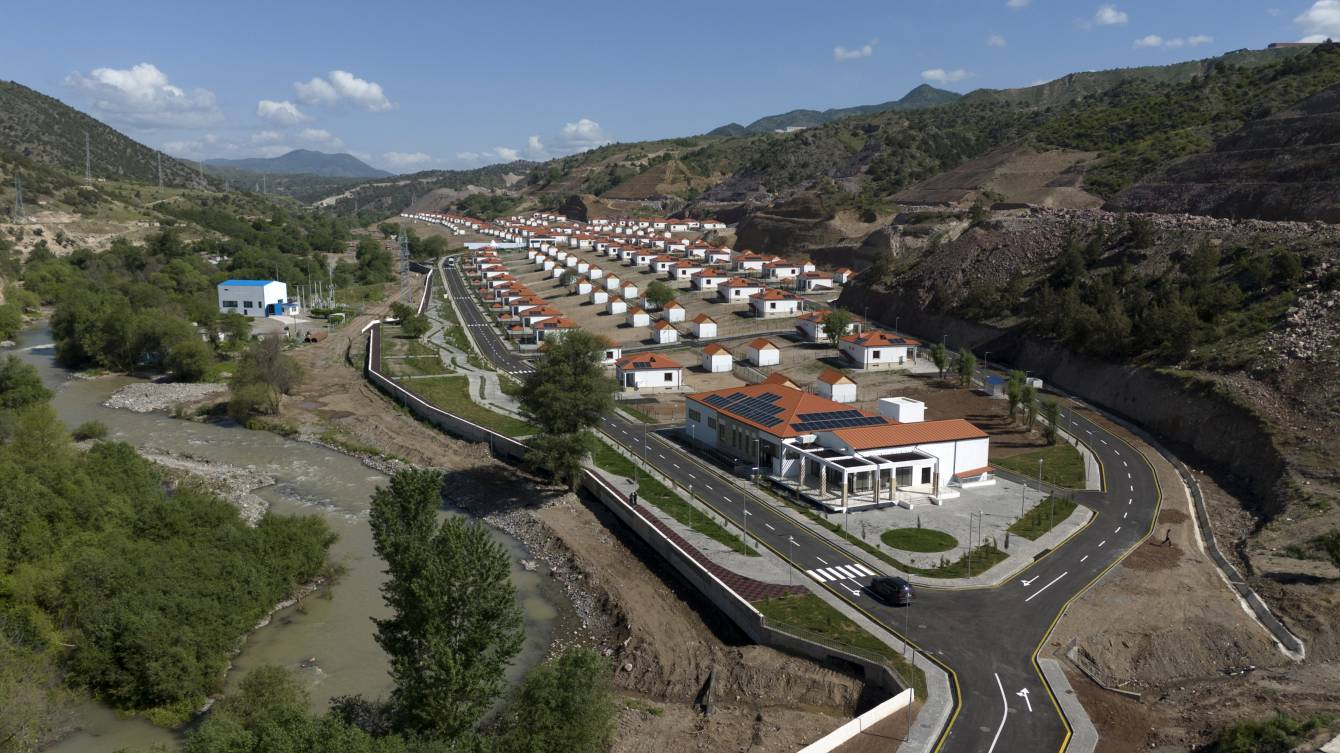
- Bəylik in 2025

- Location within Azerbaijan Location within East Zangezur Economic Region
- Coordinates: 39°39′22″N 46°30′50″E
- Country: Azerbaijan
- District: Lachin

Population (2025)
  - Total: 363
- Time zone: UTC+4 (AZT)

Beylik (Azerbaijani: Bəylik) is a village in the Zabukh village administrative territorial district of Lachin District, Azerbaijan. It forms part of the Zabukh rural administrative unit, whose administrative centre is the village of Zabukh.

== Geography ==
Beylik lies in the mountainous part of Lachin District. Together with Zabukh, Gizilja and Sus, it is included in the Zabukh rural administrative-territorial district.

== History ==
=== 1990s–2020 ===
During the First Nagorno-Karabakh War, Lachin District came under Armenian control in 1992. In Azerbaijani legislation, Beylik was officially registered as a settlement by a law adopted on 5 October 1999.

Following the 2020 Nagorno-Karabakh war and the trilateral ceasefire statement of 9–10 November 2020, Lachin District was returned to Azerbaijan on 1 December 2020. In August 2022, Azerbaijan also regained control over the areas around the town of Lachin and the villages of Zabukh and Sus.

=== Reconstruction and resettlement (2025) ===
After reconstruction, Beylik was inaugurated on 27 May 2025 with the participation of President Ilham Aliyev. Official information released at the opening stated that the village territory covered about 29.6 hectares and that 91 private houses had been built as part of the project.

Resettlement of former internally displaced residents began in late May 2025. Reports described staged arrivals (including groups on 29 May and 31 May), and by 31 May 2025 a total of 89 families (363 people) had reportedly been resettled in the village.

== Infrastructure ==
Beylik includes a community club/centre intended for local activities, and rooftops were equipped with solar panels as part of a green energy approach. Roads, electricity and communications lines, and gas supply were reported as provided during reconstruction. A main water pipeline of about 4.36 km was also reported as constructed for the village’s water supply.

== Etymology ==
The toponym is commonly analysed as deriving from bey (a title) and the suffix -lik (denoting affiliation), with an interpretation along the lines of “a settlement belonging to the bey”.

== Gallery ==
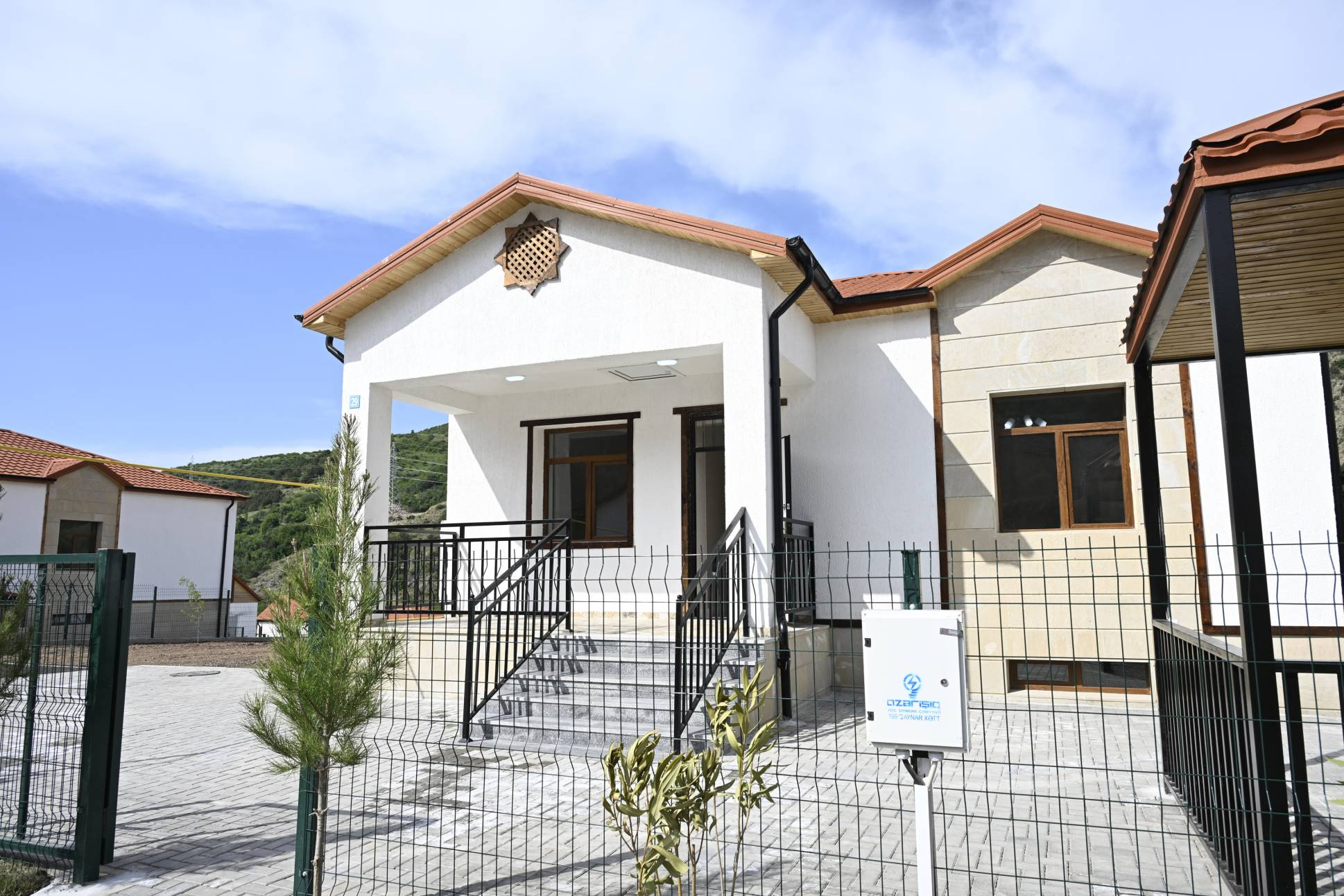

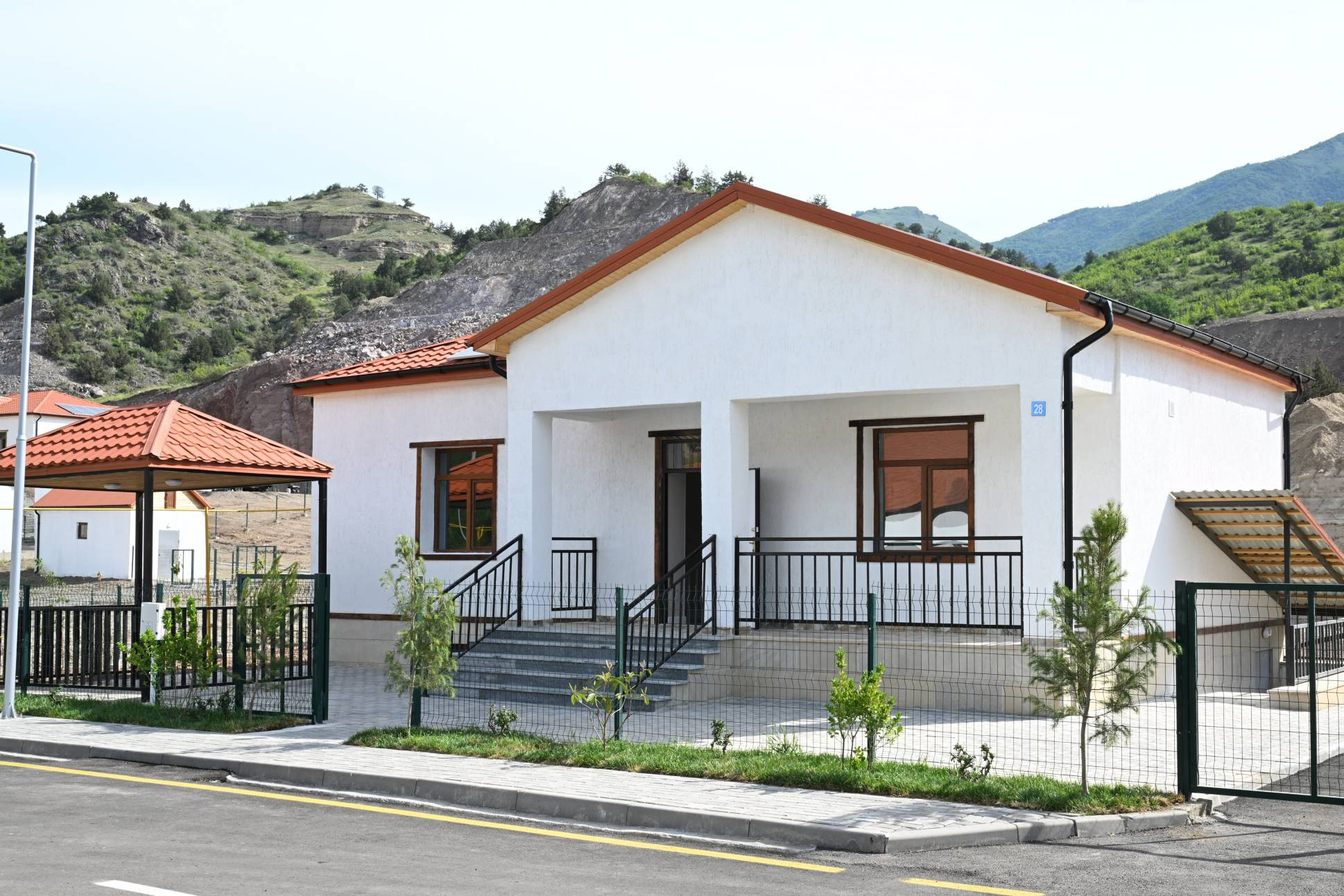

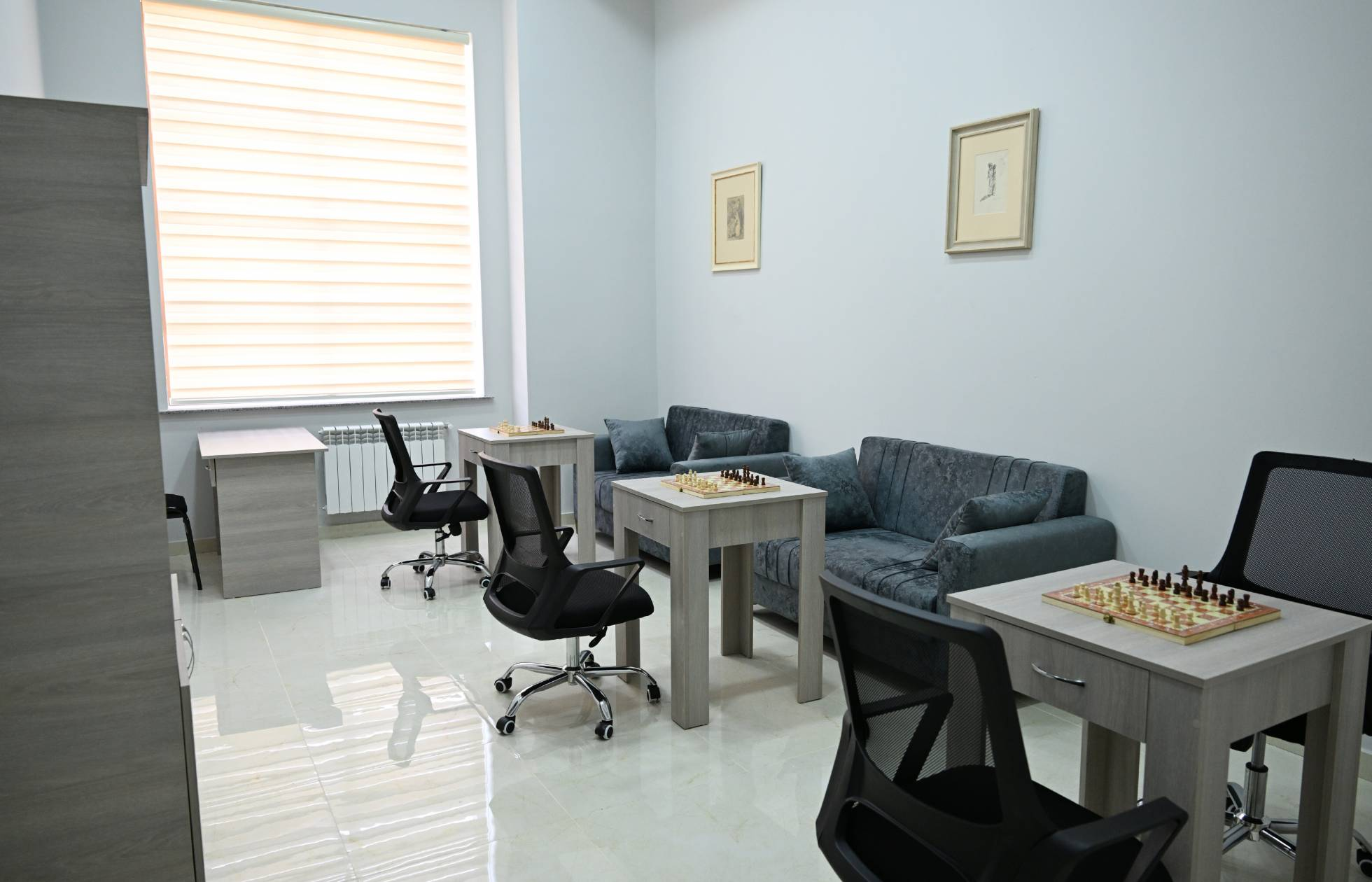

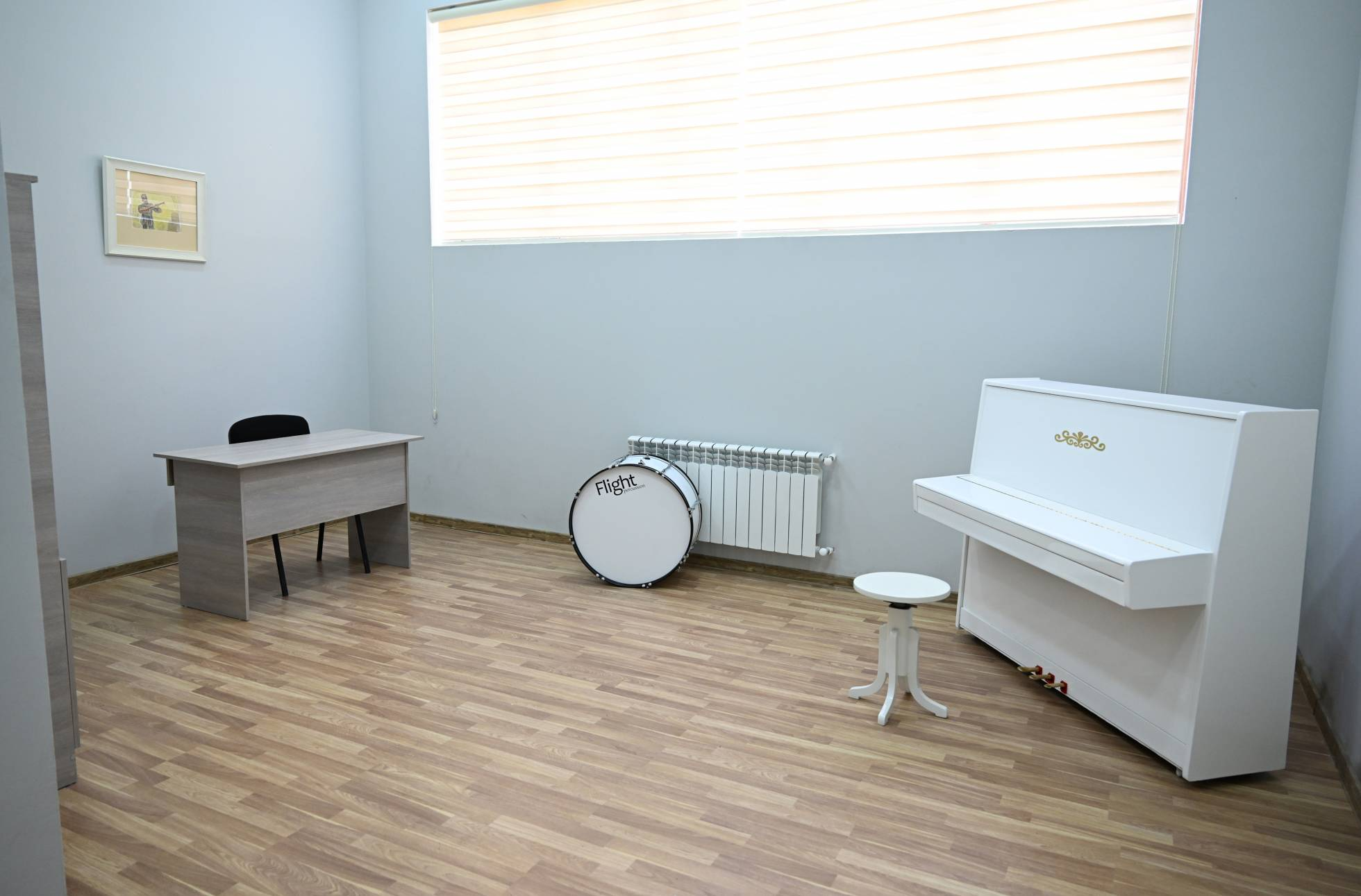
