= Alakbar Aliyev =

Azerbaijani soldier

Ələkbər Əliyev
- Born: December 22, 1955; Ishikhly, Qubadlı, Azerbaijan SSR, USSR
- Died: August 7, 1992 (aged 36); Suarası, Lachin, Azerbaijan
- Military career
- Allegiance: Republic of Azerbaijan
- Service years: 1992
- Conflicts: First Nagorno-Karabakh War
- Awards: National Hero of Azerbaijan; 1992

Alakbar Aliyev (Azerbaijani: Ələkbər Həsən oğlu Əliyev; 22 December 1955, in Ishikhly, Qubadlı, Azerbaijan – 7 August 1992, in Suarası, Lachin, Azerbaijan) was a National Hero of Azerbaijan, and a soldier of the First Nagorno-Karabakh War.

== Early life and education ==
Alakbar Aliyev was born on 22 December 1955 in Ishigli village of the Gubadly district of Azerbaijan. He graduated from the Sumgait Polytechnic Institute. Aliyev worked as chairman of the Chemical Union of the Gubadly district, and then as Deputy Chairman of Sovkhoz in his native village.

== First Nagorno-Karabakh War ==
Alakbar Aliyev voluntarily fought in the conflict when Armenian soldiers attacked the Nagorno-Karabakh region in southwestern Azerbaijan. On 7 August 1992, he was killed in action in the village of Suarasy in the Lachin District.

== Personal life ==
Aliyev was married; he was the father of four children.

== Honors and memorial ==
On 7 December 1992, by Presidential Decree No. 350, Aliyev was posthumously awarded the title of National Hero of Azerbaijan. He was buried in Martyrs' Lane in Baku. Secondary school No. 204 in Khatai District of Baku is named after him.

== See also ==
- First Nagorno-Karabakh War
- National Hero of Azerbaijan

== Sources ==
- Vugar Asgarov. Azərbaycanın Milli Qəhrəmanları (Yenidən işlənmiş II nəşr). Bakı: "Dərələyəz-M", 2010, səh. 79.
