= İşıqlı =

İşıqlı or Ishikhly or Ishygly may refer to:

- İşıqlı, Fizuli, Azerbaijan
- İşıqlı, Qubadli, Azerbaijan
