= Unannovu =

Unannovu / Hunanav Unannovu / Հունանավ
- Location within Azerbaijan Location within East Zangezur Economic Region
- Coordinates: 39°35′54″N 46°36′22″E
- Country: Azerbaijan
- District: Lachin

Population (2015)
  - Total: 0
- Time zone: UTC+4

Unannovu or Hunanav (Armenian: Հունանավ, also Hunanavan, Հունանավան) is a village in the Lachin District of Azerbaijan. Prior to a 2023 offensive by Azerbaijan, the village was located in a new corridor between Armenia and Nagorno-Karabakh, controlled by Russian peacekeepers, that replaced the Lachin corridor in August 2022.

== History ==
The village was located in the Armenian-occupied territories surrounding Nagorno-Karabakh, coming under the control of ethnic Armenian forces during the First Nagorno-Karabakh War in the early 1990s, subsequently becoming part of the breakaway Republic of Artsakh as part of its Shushi Province. The village was returned to Azerbaijan as part of the 2020 Nagorno-Karabakh ceasefire agreement.

== Notable natives ==
- Israfil Shahverdiyev — National Hero of Azerbaijan.
