= 811th Lachin Alpine Rifle Regiment =

Rifle regiment in the Azerbaijani Armed Forces during the First Nagorno-Karabakh War

- Azerbaijani: 811 сајлы Лачын дағ-атыҹы алајы 811 saylı Laçın dağ-atıcı alayı
- Active: 27 March 1992–30 April 1992 (de jure); 15 October 1993 (de facto)
- Country: Azerbaijan
- Allegiance: Azerbaijani Armed Forces
- Branch: Azerbaijani Land Forces
- Type: Rifle regiment
- Role: Alpine warfare
- Size: 1,000+ (March 1992)
- Garrison/HQ: Lachin (until April 1992)
- Engagements: First Nagorno-Karabakh War: Battle of Lachin; Battle of Shusha

Commanders
- Current commander: Arif Pasha
- Chief of staff: Rafig Nagiyev

The 811th Lachin Alpine Rifle Regiment (Azerbaijani: 811 сајлы Лачын дағ-атыҹы алајы/811 saylı Laçın dağ-atıcı alayı), or simply the Lachin Regiment (Azerbaijani: Лачын алајы/Laçın alayı), was a rifle regiment in the Azerbaijani Armed Forces, directly subordinated to the Azerbaijani Ministry of Defence, and designated for alpine warfare in Lachin District of Azerbaijan during the First Nagorno-Karabakh War.

The regiment was established on 27 March 1992, on the basis of Lachin Territorial Self-Defence Battalion. The regiment was abolished by the decree of the Azerbaijani Ministry of Defence on 30 April 1992, two weeks before the Armenian forces occupied Lachin. Despite this, the regiment continued its activity until late-1993, taking part in the battles in Lachin and Shusha.

== History ==
=== Background ===
In the late 1980s, ethnic and territorial conflict broke out between the Armenians and Azerbaijanis in the disputed Nagorno-Karabakh region. Initially, the Armenians carried out small attacks on the villages of Lachin District and buried primitive mines on the roads, which was mostly populated by the Azerbaijanis and Kurds. The district administration established a Defence Committee as the number policemen in the region was insufficient at the time. The Defence Committee was provided with an administrative building, transport and communication facilities on the instructions of the district administration. Thus, the first volunteers from Lachin, together with the local police, began to patrol the checkpoints in the border villages.

=== Lachin Territorial Self-Defence Battalion ===
İn late September 1991, the Azerbaijani authorities instructed local military officials to select several people from Karabakh and send them to Baku. In Baku, the military authorities identified commanders for the self-defence battalions, which were to be established in the districts of Karabakh. Arif Pasha, who left Lachin for Baku, and was the chairman of the Lachin branch of the Azerbaijani Popular Front Party since late 1989, was selected commander of the Lachin Territorial Self-Defence Battalion (Azerbaijani: Лачын әрази өзүнүмүдафиә баталјону/Laçın ərazi özünümüdafiə batalyonu), which was also known as the Lachin Battalion (Azerbaijani: Лачын баталјону/Laçın batalyonu).

After Arif Pasha returned to Lachin, a session of the Lachin District Executive Committee was held. Arif Pasha was confirmed as the commander of the battalion to be established in Lachin. It was recommended at the session to form a contingent of officers from 1 to 4 October, to gather soldiers and hold certain trainings from 4 to 8 October, and to report on the establishment of the Lachin Territorial Self-Defence Battalion on 9 October. On 28 September 1991, mobilisation was declared in Lachin District. Officers were appointed from 1 to 4 October, per the recommendation. By the order of Arif Pasha, Rafig Nagiyev was appointed the chief of staff on 1 October.

The battalion, initially consisting of 250 men, numbered 800 in December 1991 and more than 1,000 in March 1992. According to the battalion commander Arif Pasha, after the mobilisation was announced in the district, there were 500 people in the line as of 10 October 1991. On 15 October 1991, 560 people were sworn in.

=== 811th Lachin Alpine Rifle Regiment ===
811th Lachin Alpine Rifle Regiment was established on 27 March 1992, on the basis of Lachin Territorial Self-Defence Battalion. Arif Pasha was the commander of the military unit, while Rafig Nagiyev was its chief of staff. The regiment was abolished on 30 April 1992, by the decree of the then Azerbaijani Minister of Defence, Rahim Gaziyev, and was subordinated to the 704th Brigade, which was commanded by Elbrus Orujov. 18 days later, Lachin was occupied by the Armenian forces. Raziyev later stated that he did not read the main part of the decree and blamed the General Staff for its abolition. According to Arif Pasha, the regiment continued its activities after its de jure abolition. According to Rafig Naghiyev, the regiment assisted the Azerbaijani forces in Dashalty during the Battle of Shusha in May 1992. Naghiyev stated that the regiment, which included policemen from Lachin, moved inside Shusha to assist the Azerbaijani forces, but they were not commanded by anyone. After this, most of the servicemen in the 811th Lachin Alpine Rifle Regiment were transferred to the 896th Jabrayil Regiment, and took part in the Operation Horadiz.
