= Sus, Lachin =

Sus
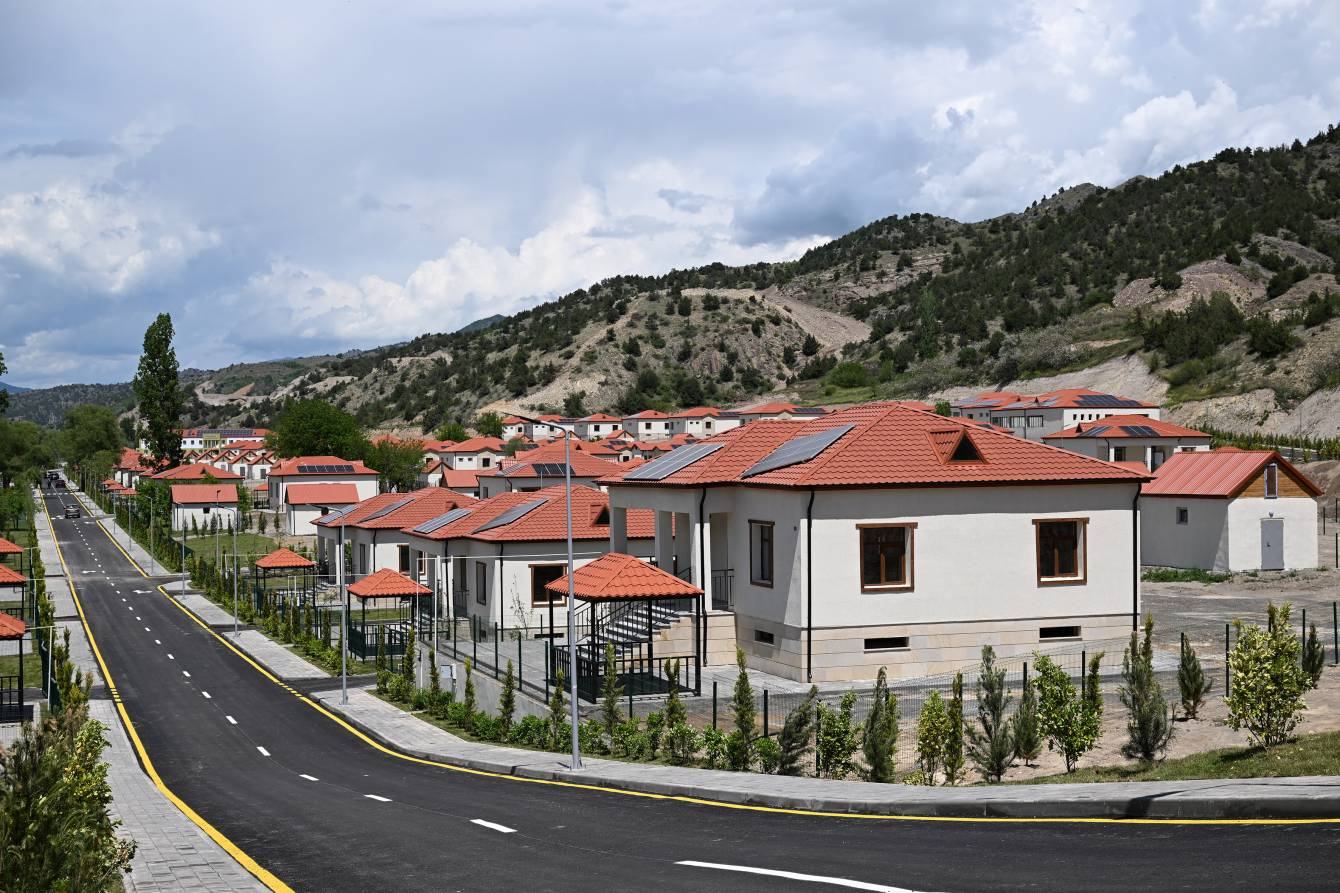

- Location within Azerbaijan Location within East Zangezur Economic Region
- Coordinates: 39°37′37″N 46°30′46″E
- Country: Azerbaijan
  - District: Lachin

Population (2021)
  - Total: 30
- Time zone: UTC+4 (UTC)

Sus (Azerbaijani: Sus; Armenian: Սուս) is a village in Lachin District of Azerbaijan. It was under the supervision of the Russian peacekeeping force following the ceasefire agreement that ended the 2020 Nagorno-Karabakh war. The village came under the de facto control of the breakaway Republic of Artsakh from 1992–2022, administrated as part of its Kashatagh Province, de jure part of the Lachin District of Azerbaijan. As of 26 August 2022, Azerbaijan regained control of villages in the Lachin corridor, including Lachin, Sus, and Zabukh.

== Geography ==
Sus sits on the Hakari (Aghavno) river, opposite to Ashaghy Sus (Nerkin Sus). It is 1.8 km (1.1 mi) from Ashaghy Sus (Nerkin Sus), 3.1 km (1.9 mi) from Lachin (Berdzor), 4.8 km (3.0 mi) from Zabukh (Aghavno), 8.4 km (5.2 mi) from Tegh, Armenia, 19.6 km (12.2 mi) from Goris, Armenia, and 30.9 km (19.2 mi) from Stepanakert (Khankendi). At its closest, the Armenian border is 4.6 km (2.9 mi) away.

== Economy and culture ==
The population is mainly engaged in agriculture and animal husbandry. As of 2015, the village has a municipal building and a secondary school.

== Demographics ==
The village had 30 inhabitants in 2005, and 26 inhabitants in 2015. Following the 2020 ceasefire, only around 200 Armenians remained in the Lachin corridor, with 30 of them being in Sus.

== Administration ==
According to the administrative division of the Republic of Artsakh, along with the village of Sus, the community of Sus includes the villages of Ashaghy Sus (Nerkin Sus), Mollalar (Gihut) and Gizilja (Urmia). According to the administrative division of Azerbaijan, the village forms an administrative unit together with the villages of Zabukh (Aghavno), Baylik and Gizilja (Urmia).
