= Galadarasi =

- Qaladərəsi
- Böyük Galadərəsi
- Kiçik Galadərəsi
