= Mezmazak =

- Location within Azerbaijan Location within East Zangezur Economic Region
- Coordinates: 39°29′04″N 46°32′42″E
- Country: Azerbaijan
- Rayon: Lachin
- Time zone: UTC+4 (AZT)
  - Summer (DST): UTC+5 (AZT)

Mezmazak (also, Mazmazak) is a village in the Lachin Rayon of Azerbaijan.
