= Shahverdiyev =

Shahverdiyev is a surname. Notable people with the surname include:

- Ehtiram Shahverdiyev (born 1996), Azerbaijani footballer
- Israfil Shahverdiyev (1952–1994), National Hero of Azerbaijan
- Mushfig Shahverdiyev (born 1983), Azerbaijani actor
