= Alakbar =

Alakbar is a given name. Notable people with the name include:

- Alakbar Aliyev (1955–1992), National Hero of Azerbaijan
- Alakbar Huseynov (1961–2007), Azerbaijani actor
- Alakbar Mammadov (1930–2014), Soviet and Azerbaijani footballer
- Alakbar Rezaguliyev (1903–1974), Azerbaijani artist
- Alakbar Taghiyev (1924–1981), Azerbaijani composer
- Mirza Alakbar Sabir (1862–1911), Azerbaijani poet
