= Zabukh =

Zabukh / Aghavno Zabux / Աղավնո
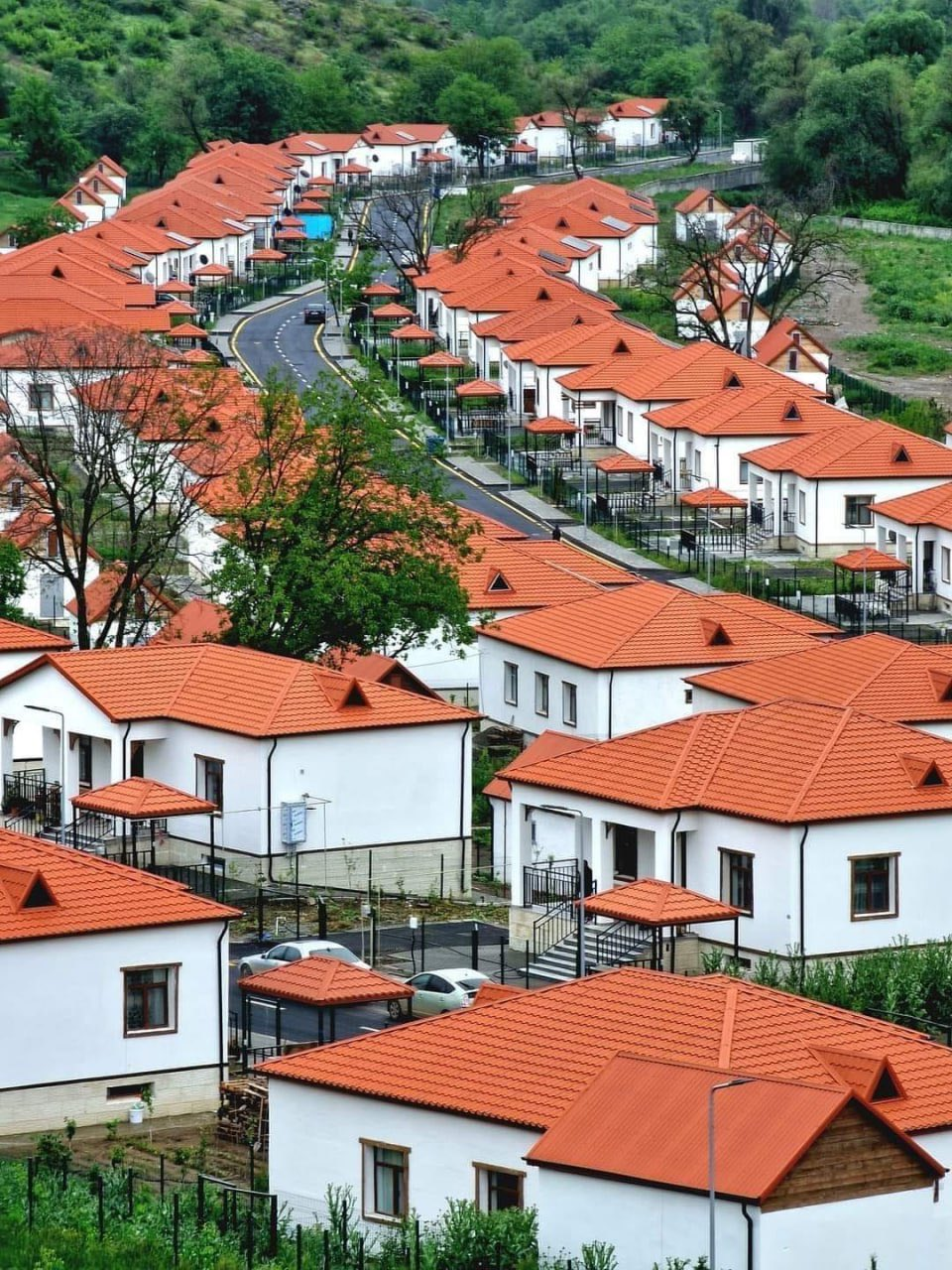
- Zabukh village in 2024

- Location within Azerbaijan Location within East Zangezur Economic Region
- Coordinates: 39°35′23″N 46°32′36″E
- Country: Azerbaijan
  - District: Lachin

Population (2021)
  - Total: ~165
- Time zone: UTC+4 (UTC)

Zabukh (Azerbaijani: Zabux) or Aghavno (Armenian: Աղավնո) is a village in the Lachin District of Azerbaijan. The village came under the control of the breakaway Republic of Artsakh after 1992 and was renamed Aghavno and settled by Armenians. Following the 2020 Nagorno-Karabakh war, Zabukh came under the control of the Russian peacekeeping forces in Nagorno-Karabakh. On 26 August 2022, Azerbaijan regained control of Zabukh along with other settlements located along the former route of the Lachin corridor, including Lachin and Sus.

== Toponymy ==
Zabukh (also rendered Zabuk in Armenian) is also the name of a tributary of the Hakari River that runs by the village. After coming under Armenian control in 1992, the village was renamed Aghavno, which is one of the Armenian names of the Hakari River. The village is also known as Ariavan (Armenian: Արիավան).

== History ==
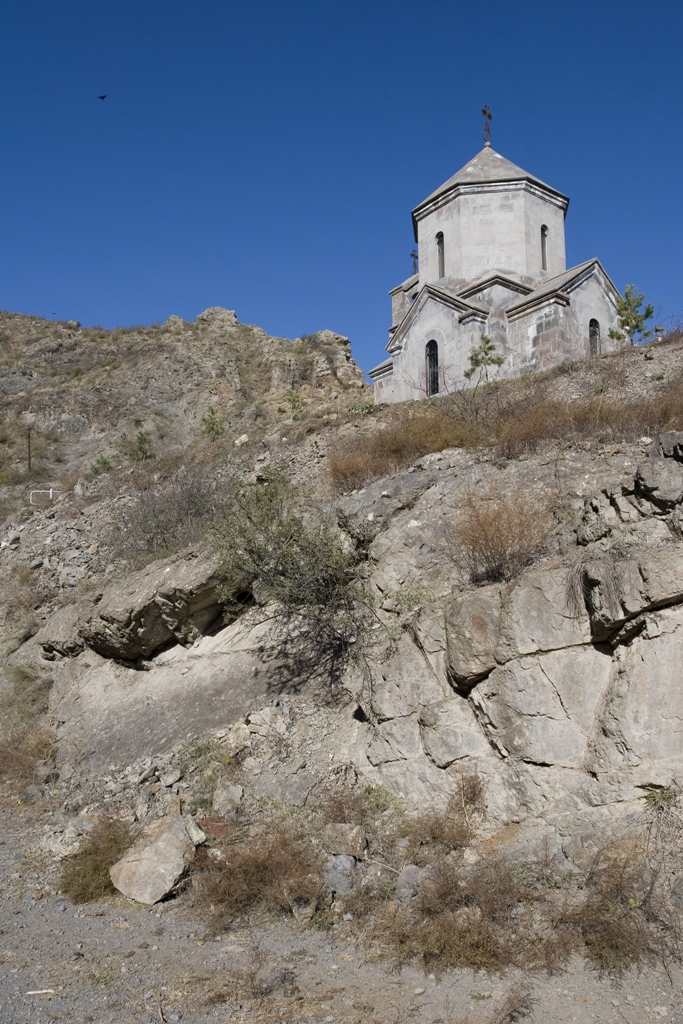
Church of the Holy Martyrs, built in the village in 2002

Several Armenian authors identify Zabukh with the village of Shabaki or Shapoki mentioned by the medieval Armenian historian Stephen Orbelian, although this is not universally accepted. In 1898 the German archaeologist Emil Rösler studied an archaeological site in the vicinity of the village, which he concluded was as old Armenian cemetery. In the late 19th century, the village was inhabited by Turkic-speaking Kurds.

=== First Nagorno-Karabakh War ===
When the village was seized by Armenian forces in 1992 during the First Nagorno-Karabakh War, its Azerbaijani population fled. The village was looted and burnt by Armenian forces. Among the looters, there also were civilians from Stepanakert, which had been shelled by the Azerbaijanis for eight months and had been without light and water for several weeks. A Canadian journalist who visited the village a year later noted that the village was "entirely abandoned", and all that remained were "two dozen charred, roofless houses".

While under Armenian control, the village was administered as part of the Kashatagh Province of the Republic of Artsakh. The Artsakh administration renovated the village, and it was settled mostly by Armenians from Armenia and some from Armenian communities in Lebanon and Syria. In September 2016, the settlement was officially re-inaugurated as Ariavan (Armenian: Արիավան).

=== Russian peacekeeper control ===
Following the ceasefire agreement ending the 2020 Nagorno-Karabakh war, the Lachin corridor came under the supervision of Russian peacekeeping forces, who set up a post in Aghavno. According to the ceasefire agreement, a new route connecting Armenia with Nagorno-Karabakh bypassing Lachin and Aghavno would be planned within three years.

Ahead of the transfer of the Lachin District to Azerbaijan per the ceasefire agreement, many ethnic Armenians fled from the Lachin corridor, with the BBC Russian Service correspondent, Yuri Vekdik, stating that the vast majority of the Armenians inhabitants had fled. The Artsakh administration initially called on the ethnic Armenian population to evacuate. However, from 27 November, Armenian media reported that the agreement has been amended, adding that Aghavno, as well as Lachin (Berdzor), the district's administrative center, and Sus, would not be handed over to Azerbaijan, citing the Artsakh mayor of Lachin (Berdzor), Narek Aleksanyan.

In May 2021 the village school was renovated with the assistance of the ACAA Artsakh Fund, which also planned the renovation of the municipal building and the construction of a medical centre in the village, and in December 2021, a new bakery was opened in the village.

=== Return to Azerbaijani control ===
On 10 August 2022, following renewed clashes in Nagorno-Karabakh to the north of the Lachin corridor, the Armenian residents of the village were told by Artsakhi authorities to leave the village within 20 days. This came amid demands by Azerbaijan for the Armenian side to speed up the transfer to the new route connecting Nagorno-Karabakh and Armenia, the Armenian section of which was still not completed. The village was returned to Azerbaijani control on 26 August 2022, prior to which all of the Armenian residents left.

In March 2023, Azerbaijan's president Ilham Aliyev announced that the village of Zabukh would be completely rebuilt, and over 1000 people would be resettled there.

== Economy and culture ==
The population is mainly engaged in agriculture and animal husbandry. As of 2015, the village has a municipal building, two shops, and a school.

== Demographics ==
According to the 1856 publication of the Caucasus Calendar, Zabukh in 1855 was populated by Shiite Kurds, who spoke the Tatar (Azerbaijani) language. According to the Collection of Statistical Data on the Population of the Transcaucasus krai, the population of the village in 1886 was 112, all Kurds. According to the 1910 publication of the Caucasus Calendar the population of the village in 1908 was 345, mostly Tatar. In the 1912 publication, the population in 1911 was 150, mostly Armenian. According to the 1915 publication of the Caucasus Calendar, the population of the village in 1914 was 83, mostly Tatar.

The village had 149 inhabitants in 2005, 175 inhabitants in 2015, and 270 inhabitants in 2019. Following the ceasefire agreement after the 2020 Nagorno-Karabakh war, around 200 Armenians remained in the Lachin corridor, with around 40 of them being in Aghavno. By June 2022 another 125 returned but the opening of new road connecting Nagorno-Karabach to Armenia meant Zabukh was no longer within the 5-kilometre wide Lachin corridor and so control of the village passed to Azerbaijan. The last of the Armenians left on 25 August 2022.

In 2023, the Azerbaijani government started works on rebuilding the village. According to the Deputy Chairman of the State Committee for Refugees and Internally Displaced Persons Fuad Huseynov, from February to August 2023, 223 modern private houses and all the necessary social infrastructure were built in Zabukh. On 25 August, the first group of 88 IDPs (20 families), who lived in Barda, Shirvan and Mingachevir, moved to Zabukh. On 16 November 2023, 25 IDP families returned from Baku to Zabukh and the total number of residents in the village reached 288. By the end of November 2023, 121 families consisting of 475 persons resettled in the village. On 25 December, 27 IDP families moved from Baku to Zabukh and the total number of residents in the village reached 783.

== Gallery ==
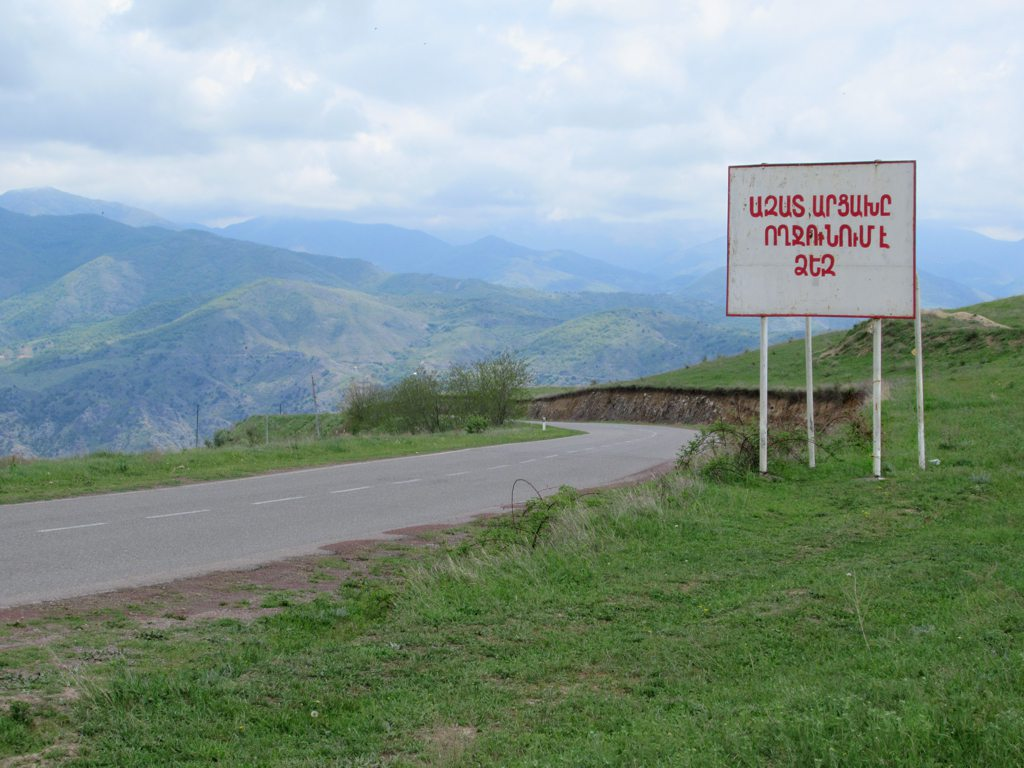

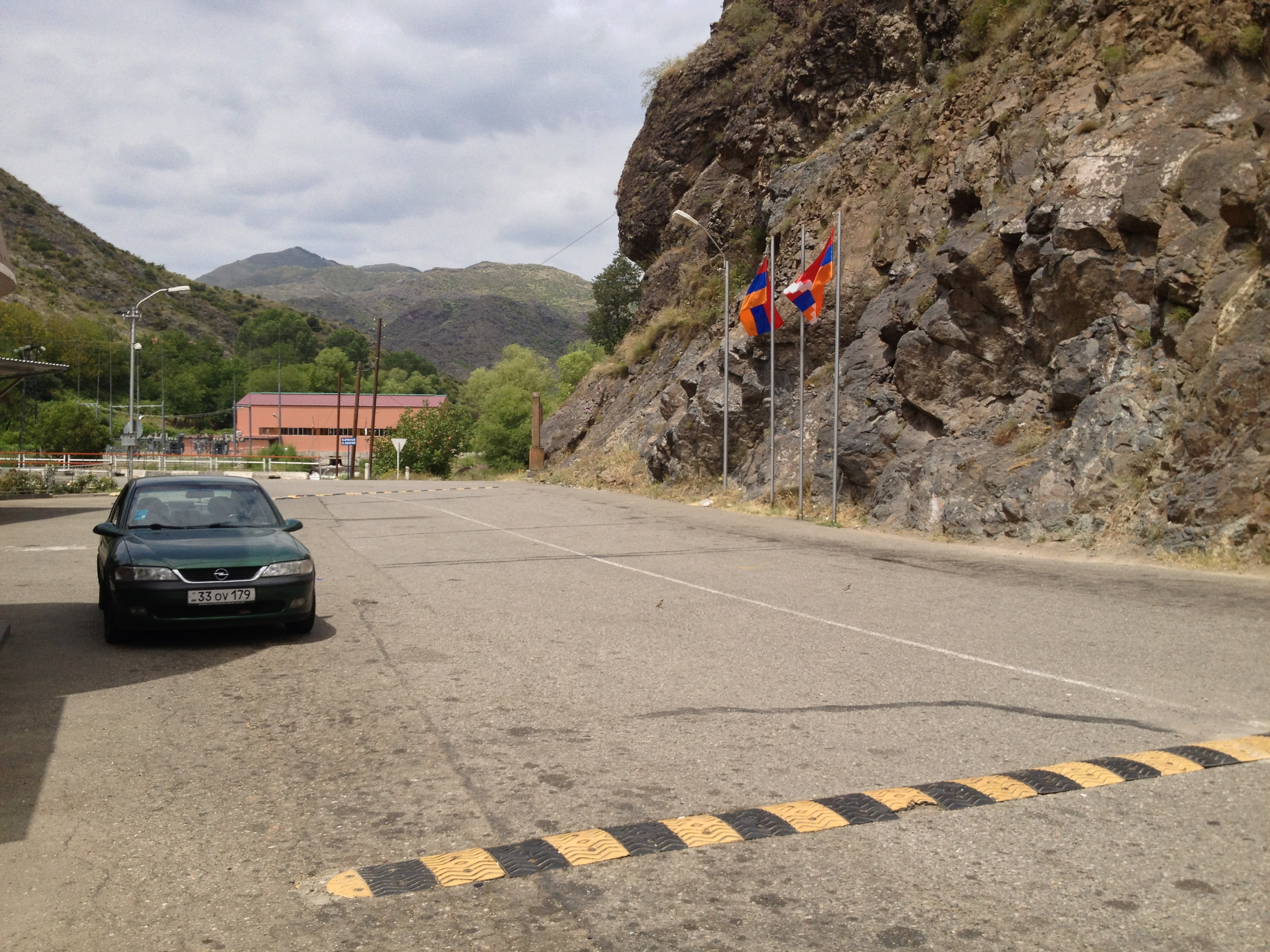

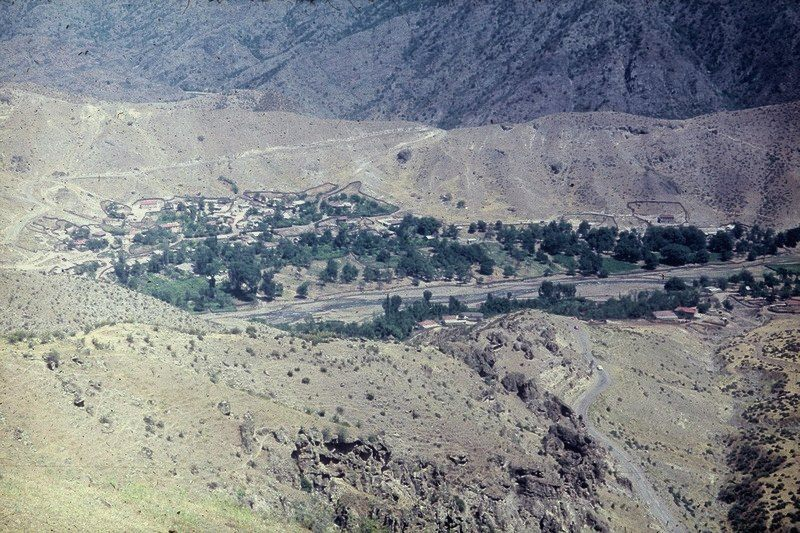

== See also ==
- Bəylik, Lachin
