= Bozdağan =

Village in Azerbaijan

Coordinates: 39°53′N 46°26′E

Bozdağan Bozdaghan
- Location in Azerbaijan
- Country: Azerbaijan
- District: Lachin District

Bozdağan (Bozdaghan) is a village in the Lachin District of Azerbaijan.
