= Oghuldara =

Oghuldara Oğuldərə
- Location within Azerbaijan Location within East Zangezur Economic Region
- Coordinates: 39°53′30″N 46°18′56″E
- Country: Azerbaijan
- Rayon: Lachin
- Elevation: 1,776 m (5,827 ft)
- Time zone: UTC+4 (AZT)

Oghuldara (Azerbaijani: Oğuldərə) is a village in Lachin district of Azerbaijan. Between 17 May 1992 and 1 December 2020, the entire district was under Armenian control.
