= Cağazur =

Cağazur or Dzhagazur or Dzhagadzur or Dzhagazyr may refer to:

- Cağazur, Lachin, Azerbaijan
- Cağazur, Nakhchivan, Azerbaijan
