= Uludüz =

- Location within Azerbaijan Location within East Zangezur Economic Region
- Coordinates: 39°38′47″N 46°27′57″E
- Country: Azerbaijan
- Rayon: Lachin
- Time zone: UTC+4 (AZT)
  - Summer (DST): UTC+5 (AZT)

Uludüz (also, Uluduz) is a village in the Lachin Rayon of Azerbaijan.
