= Katos =

Village in Azerbaijan

Coordinates: 39°46′N 46°18′E

Katos is a village in the Lachin Rayon of Azerbaijan.
