= Sadınlar =

- Location within Azerbaijan Location within East Zangezur Economic Region
- Coordinates: 39°39′05″N 46°20′50″E
- Country: Azerbaijan
- Rayon: Lachin
- Time zone: UTC+4 (AZT)
  - Summer (DST): UTC+5 (AZT)

Sadınlar (also, Sadynlar) is a village in the Lachin Rayon of Azerbaijan.
