= Babadin =

- Location within Azerbaijan Location within East Zangezur Economic Region
- Coordinates: 39°44′N 46°29′E
- Country: Azerbaijan
- District: Lachin
- Time zone: UTC+4 (AZT)
  - Summer (DST): UTC+5 (AZT)

Babadin is a village in the Lachin District of Azerbaijan.
