= Shikhov =

Shikhov (masculine; Russian: Шихов), Shikhova (feminine) or Shikhovo (gender-neutral) may refer to

== Places ==
- İşıqlı, Qubadli (formerly Shikhova), a village in Azerbaijan
- Bibiheybət (formerly Shikhovo), a municipality in Baku, Azerbaijan
  - Shikhov Beach, a resort area in Bibiheybət, Azerbaijan

== People ==
- Galina Shikhova (born 1940), Soviet alpine skier
- Konstantin Shikhov (born 1984), Russian sledge hockey player
- Yekaterina Shikhova (born 1985), Russian speed skater
