= Ağalaruşağı =

Human settlement in Azerbaijan

Coordinates: 39°54′N 46°18′E

Ağalaruşağı is a village in the Lachin Rayon of Azerbaijan, in the region of Nagorno-Karabakh. Prior to 2023, it was de facto a part of the breakaway Republic of Artsakh.
