= Tərxanlı =

- Location within Azerbaijan Location within East Zangezur Economic Region
- Coordinates: 39°34′17″N 46°37′34″E
- Country: Azerbaijan
- Rayon: Lachin
- Time zone: UTC+4 (AZT)
  - Summer (DST): UTC+5 (AZT)

Tərxanlı (also, Tarkhanly and Tarkanly) is a village in the Lachin Rayon of Azerbaijan.
