= Aşağı Cicimli =

Village in Azerbaijan

Aşağı Cicimli Ashagy Jijimli
- Location within Azerbaijan Location within East Zangezur Economic Region
- Coordinates: 39°31′44″N 46°32′34″E
- Country: Azerbaijan
- District: Lachin
- Time zone: UTC+4 (AZT)

Aşağı Cicimli (Ashagy Jijimli) is a village in the Lachin District of Azerbaijan.
