= Kəravuz =

Village in Azerbaijan

Coordinates: 39°37′N 46°34′E

Kəravuz (Keravuz) is a village in the Lachin Rayon of Azerbaijan.
