= Dəyirmanyanı =

Village in Azerbaijan

Coordinates: 39°35′N 46°36′E

Dəyirmanyanı is a village in the Lachin Rayon of Azerbaijan.
