= Narışlar =

- Location within Azerbaijan Location within East Zangezur Economic Region
- Coordinates: 39°48′25″N 46°18′13″E
- Country: Azerbaijan
- Rayon: Lachin
- Time zone: UTC+4 (AZT)
  - Summer (DST): UTC+5 (AZT)

Narışlar (also, Naryshlar) is a village in the Lachin Rayon of Azerbaijan.
