= Avazlar =

- Interactive map of Avazlar
- Country: Azerbaijan
- District: Lachin
- Time zone: UTC+4 (AZT)

Avazlar (Avaslar) is a village in the Lachin District of Azerbaijan.
