= Keçmədin =

Village and municipality in Azerbaijan

Coordinates: 40.74787°N 48.55663°E

Keçmədin (also, Keçməddin) is a village and municipality in the Shamakhi Rayon of Azerbaijan. It has a population of 356. The municipality consists of the villages of Keçmədin and Qaladərəsi.
