= Cağazur, Lachin =

Jaghazur
- Azerbaijani: Cağazur
- Location within Azerbaijan Location within East Zangezur Economic Region
- Coordinates: 39°35′26″N 46°27′41″E
- Country: Azerbaijan
- District: Lachin
- Time zone: UTC+4 (AZT)
  - Summer (DST): UTC+5 (AZT)

Cağazur (Note: Transliterated as Jaghazur) is a village in the Lachin District of Azerbaijan.
