= Arif Pasha =

Azerbaijani military officer and politician

- Native name: Arif Fəxrəddin oğlu Paşayev
- Born: Arif Fakhraddin oglu Pashayev; May 15, 1959 (age 67); Lachin, Lachin District, Azerbaijan SSR, Soviet Union
- Allegiance: Red Army (1982–1988); Azerbaijani Armed Forces (1991–1993)
- Branch: Soviet Ministry of Internal Affairs (1982–1988); Azerbaijani Land Forces (1991–1993)
- Service years: 1982–1993
- Rank: Colonel
- Commands: Lachin Territorial Self-Defence Battalion (1991–1992); 811th Lachin Alpine Rifle Regiment (1992–1993)
- Conflicts: First Nagorno-Karabakh War; Battle of Lachin
- Education: Azerbaijan Institute of Civil Engineers

Arif Fakhraddin oglu Pashayev (Azerbaijani: Arif Fəxrəddin oğlu Paşayev), also known as Arif Pasha (Azerbaijani: Arif Paşa; born 15 May 1959) is a Soviet–Azerbaijani military officer, colonel of the Azerbaijani Armed Forces and politician. He took part in the First Nagorno-Karabakh War and commanded the 811th Lachin Alpine Rifle Regiment.

== Life ==
Arif Fakhraddin oglu Pashayev was born on 15 May 1959, in Lachin, Azerbaijani SSR, then part of the Soviet Union.

He took his secondary education at the local Lachin city secondary school. Pashayev entered the Azerbaijan Institute of Civil Engineers in 1977, and graduated from the institute in 1982 with a degree in industrial and civil construction. Shortly after, he was sent to serve in the Ministry of Internal Affairs. He served abroad as a member of the Soviet contingent from 1982 to 1984. Until 1991, Pashayev worked as the head of various economic enterprises, and was the deputy chairman of the Lachin District State Property Committee. On 15 February 1988, at the beginning of the Nagorno-Karabakh conflict, he established the Provisional Emergency Committee in Stepanakert, a secret armed organization against Armenian armed groups in the Nagorno-Karabakh Autonomous Oblast seeking to unite with the Armenian SSR. In April 1988, Pashayev established and headed the Lachin District Defense Committee, which consisted of several thousand people. He founded and headed the Popular Front of Lachin in June 1988. At that time, a united popular front was not established in Azerbaijan. He was later elected a member of the First Board of the Popular Front of Azerbaijan.

Pashayev was appointed commander of the Lachin District Territorial Defense Battalion in October 1991 by the order No. 1 of the Azerbaijani Ministry of Defense. He created the first national military unit in Azerbaijan. In 27 March 1992, Pashayev created the 811th Lachin Alpine Rifle Regiment, the first regular regiment of Azerbaijan, and was appointed its commander. He was dismissed from the post of regiment commander on 30 April 1992 for unknown reasons. 18 days later, the Armenian Armed Forces occupied Lachin. From July 1992 to 2002, he was the Deputy Chairman of the Azerbaijani Popular Front Party.

Pashayev was arrested in August 1993 on 13 charges under Article 4 of the Criminal Code of Azerbaijan, and sentenced to death. He escaped from the pre-trial detention center of the Azerbaijani Ministry of National Security on 21 September 1994. Pashayev returned to court in November 1994, requesting a trial, and was acquitted on 12 May 1995.

Pashayev was the deputy chairman of the Popular Front Party of Azerbaijan, Whole Azerbaijan Popular Front Party, and Party of Hope in different years. He is a retired colonel.
