= Shargiyya Veliyeva =

Azerbaijani politician (born 1936)

- Şərqiyyə Əkbər qızı Vəliyeva
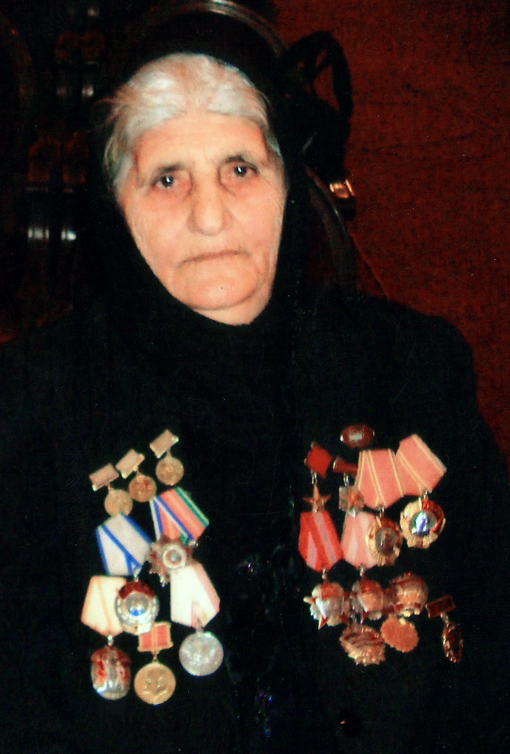
- Born: 1 July 1936 (age 90); Lachin District, Azerbaijani SSR, Soviet Union
- Occupations: Farmer and politician
- Spouse: Sabir Valiyev
- Children: 11

Shargiyya Veliyeva (Azerbaijani: Şərqiyyə Əkbər qızı Vəliyeva; born 1 July 1936), is an Azerbaijani farmer and politician. She served as a member of the Supreme Soviet of Azerbaijani SSR.

== Early life ==
Shargiya Valiyeva was born on 1 July 1936 in the village of Pichanis in the Lachin region into a peasant family.

== Career ==
She joined the Kirov collective farm, where she started working in a dairy. She participated in the VDNKh Union-wide Exposition. She distinguished herself by fulfilling the seventh five-year plan, nurturing one calf from each cow and feeding the calves 7400 liters of milk.She fulfilled the plan of the ninth five-year plan in 3 years and 10 months.

By decree of the Presidium of the Supreme Soviet of the USSR of 22 March 1966, she was awarded the title of Hero of Socialist Labour with the prize of the Order of Lenin and the gold medal of the Sickle and the Hammer.

She actively participated in the social and political life of Azerbaijan. In 1952, she joined the Komsomol. In 1965 she joined the Communist Party and in became a member of the New Azerbaijan Party. She was elected deputy of the Supreme Soviet of the Azerbaijan SSR at the seventh and eighth convocations.

== Recognition ==
- Mother Heroine
- Presidential scholarship (2002)

== Personal life ==
After the First Nagorno-Karabakh War resulted in the occupation of Lachin, Shamilya Valiyeva settled in the village of Zümurkhan, in the region of Barda. Shargia Valiyeva married Sabir Valiyev. Four of Shargia Valiyeva's children participated in the First Nagorno-Karabakh War. Her son Fuzuli Veliyev was a military pilot. Captain Fuzuli Veliyev, who had 252 flights and continued his service in the rank of captain, was killed while performing his military service in 2003.
