= Qazıdərə =

- Location within Azerbaijan Location within East Zangezur Economic Region
- Coordinates: 39°31′38″N 46°33′55″E
- Country: Azerbaijan
- Rayon: Lachin
- Time zone: UTC+4 (AZT)
  - Summer (DST): UTC+5 (AZT)

Qazıdərə (also, Gazydere, Ghazidere, and Kazidara) is a village in the Lachin Rayon of Azerbaijan.
