= Lachin corridor =

Mountain pass linking Armenia with Nagorno-Karabakh

Coordinates: 39°36′31″N 46°32′41″E

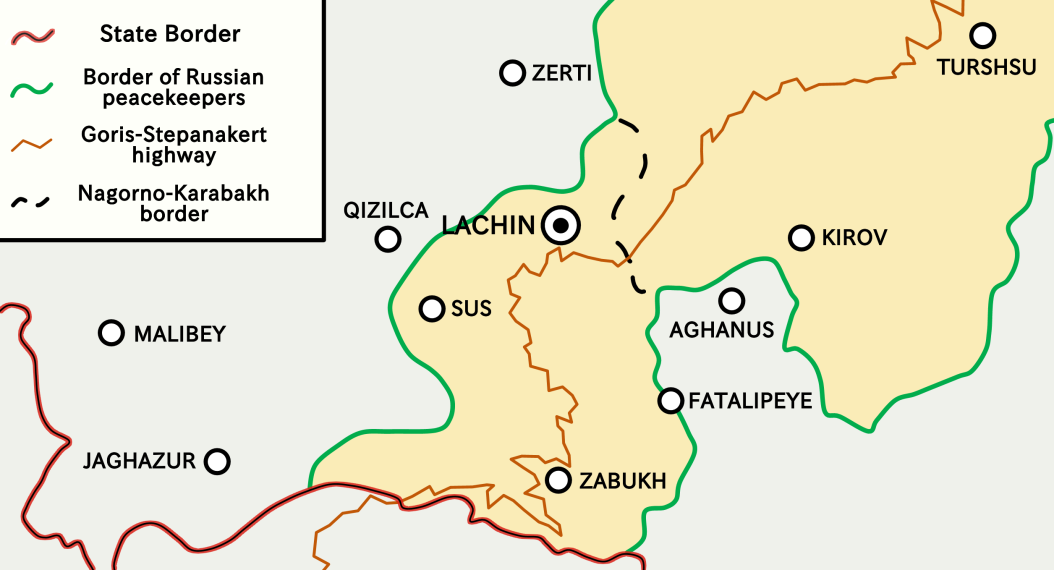
2020–2022 map of the Lachin corridor following the 2020 Nagorno-Karabakh ceasefire agreement. The new route currently in use is located to the south of the Goris-Stepanakert highway.

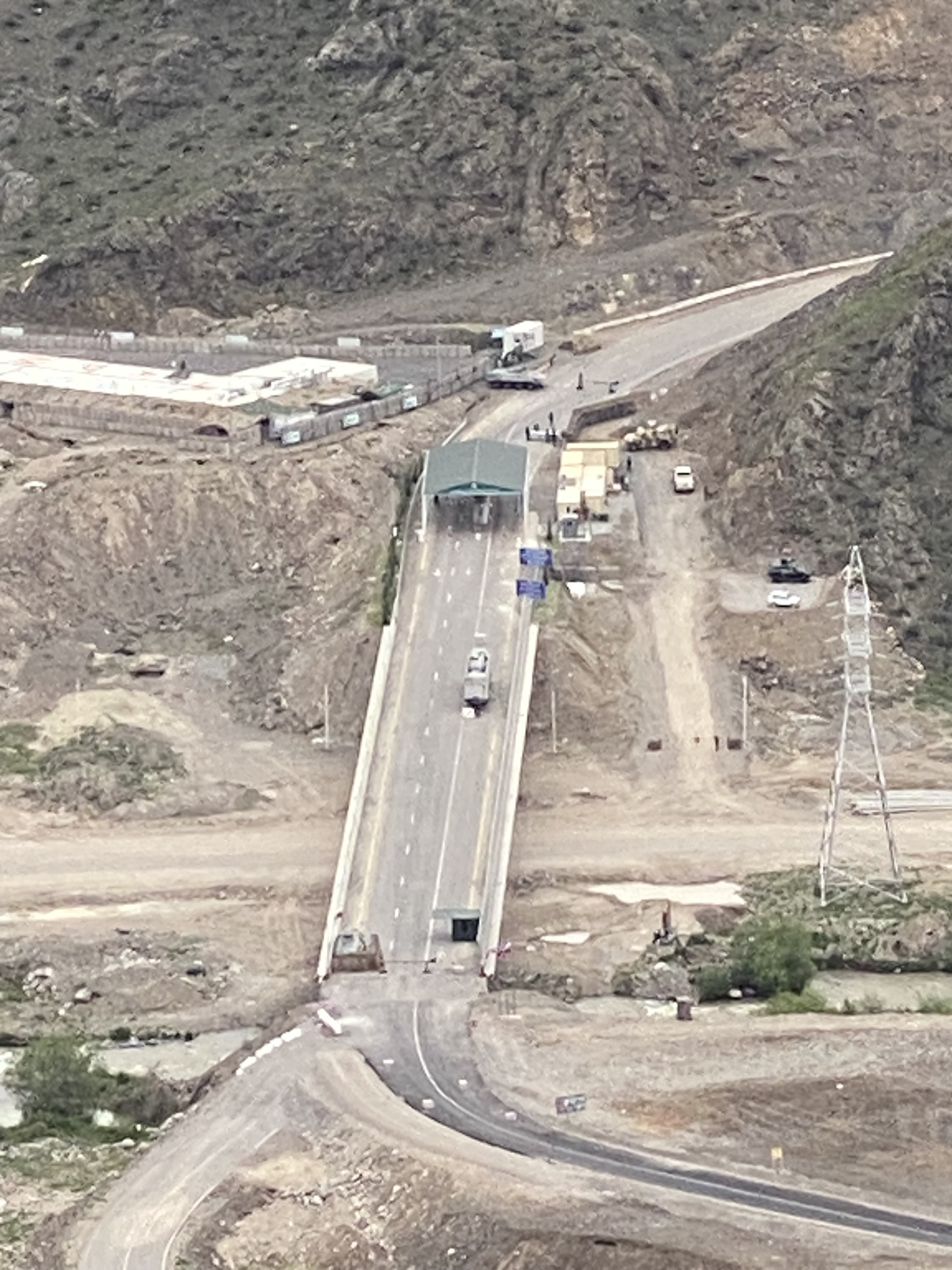
Azerbaijani checkpoint to the Lachin corridor at the Hakari bridge, viewed from Kornidzor, Republic of Armenia. The checkpoint was installed on 23 April 2023, in violation of the tripartite ceasefire agreement that ended the 2020 war.

The Lachin corridor (Note: Armenian: Լաչինի միջանցք, romanized: Lachini mijantsk; Azerbaijani: Laçın dəhlizi or Laçın koridoru; Russian: Лачи́нский коридо́р, romanized: Lachinskiy koridor) was a mountain road in Azerbaijan that previously linked Armenia and Nagorno-Karabakh.

Being the only road between these two territories, it was considered a humanitarian corridor or lifeline to the Armenian population of Nagorno-Karabakh. Until Armenia secured the Lachin corridor in 1992, the Armenians of Nagorno-Karabakh were entirely isolated, relying solely on their own limited resources and aid flown in from Armenia. At that time, humanitarian aid from the Red Cross, the UN, and France were blocked by Azerbaijani authorities.

Following the 2020 Nagorno-Karabakh ceasefire agreement, Armenia conceded control of the corridor to a Russian peacekeeping force. In 2022, the government of Azerbaijan re-imposed a siege of Nagorno-Karabakh which involved blocking the Lachin corridor. These actions were criticized by numerous countries, international organizations and human rights groups, many of which considered them to be a violation of the ceasefire agreement that ended the Second Nagorno-Karabakh War.

On 23 April 2023, Azerbaijani officials set up a checkpoint in the corridor, claiming it was meant to prevent "illegal" transport of military supplies and natural resources, however, the republics of Armenia and Artsakh denied these allegations and the ceasefire agreement did not explicitly limit the use of the Lachin corridor to humanitarian needs. After a military offensive in September 2023, Azerbaijani forces took control of the entirety of Nagorno-Karabakh, after which nearly all of the region's Armenian population fled to Armenia through the Lachin corridor.

== History ==
During the First Nagorno-Karabakh War, Nagorno-Karabakh and neighbouring Armenia were blockaded in August 1989, with Azerbaijan severing transport and economic links both between Armenia and Azerbaijan and between Nagorno-Karabakh and Armenia. In May 1992, forces of the Nagorno-Karabakh Republic captured Lachin and established a land connection with Armenia, ending the blockade. After the end of the war, the status of the Lachin corridor was one of the major issues of the peace negotiations between Armenia and Azerbaijan. Various configurations were proposed for the status of the corridor. In one round of negotiations in 1999, it was proposed that Azerbaijan would accept Armenian control over the corridor in exchange for a land corridor through southern Armenia to connect it to its exclave Nakhchivan. In a statement to the United Nations on 18 September 2005, Foreign Minister of Azerbaijan Elmar Mammadyarov stated that Azerbaijan was in favor of the deployment of a multinational peacekeeping force "at the initial stage" to ensure security along the Lachin corridor for bilateral use.

In the aftermath of the Second Nagorno-Karabakh War, which ended with a Russian-brokered armistice, the Lachin corridor became the sole connection between Armenia and Nagorno-Karabakh. The armistice agreement provided:

The Republic of Armenia shall return [...] the Lachin District by December 1, 2020. The Lachin Corridor (5 km wide), which will provide a connection between Nagorno-Karabakh and Armenia while not passing through the territory of Shusha, shall remain under the control of the Russian Federation peacemaking forces.

As agreed by the Parties, within the next three years, a plan will be outlined for the construction of a new route via the Lachin Corridor, to provide a connection between Nagorno-Karabakh and Armenia, and the Russian peacemaking forces shall be subsequently relocated to protect the route.

The Republic of Azerbaijan shall guarantee the security of persons, vehicles and cargo moving along the Lachin Corridor in both directions.

Following the ceasefire, around 200 Armenians remained in the Lachin corridor, with 30 of them in Sus, 100 to 120 in Lachin, and over 40 in Zabukh (Aghavno). President of Azerbaijan Ilham Aliyev announced that a new corridor would be built in the region that passes through Mets Shen/Boyuk Galadarasi and Hin Shen/Kichik Galadarasi. On August 26, control of the Lachin District was transferred to Azerbaijan. Artsakh authorities gave the residents of the villages along the corridor 20 days' notice to evacuate. While Aliyev promised that long-term Armenian residents of Nagorno-Karabakh would be treated as citizens, he branded the remaining residents as illegal settlers and demanded that they be removed.

A BBC journalist visited the road in March 2021, reporting that "since the war, Armenians have had no control over who and what uses this road", adding that control is now held by the Russians. Azerbaijan said that it installed video surveillance cameras along the Lachin corridor. Being the only road that connects Nagorno-Karabakh to the Republic of Armenia, it has often been described as a "lifeline" to and for residents of Nagorno-Karabakh.

=== Situation after the Second Nagorno-Karabakh War (2020) ===
In August 2022, Azerbaijan built its part of the road around Lachin, while Armenia had not. On 2 August, the local Armenian authorities reported that the Azerbaijani side had conveyed to them a demand to organize communication with Armenia along a different route, bypassing the existing one. Following the renewed clashes around Lachin, Secretary of the Security Council of Armenia Armen Grigoryan stated that Azerbaijan's demand for the Lachin corridor was unlawful, since the Armenian side has not yet agreed to any plan for the construction of a new road. Azerbaijan accused Armenia of delaying the construction of its part of the road, while the part for which Azerbaijan was responsible had already been built. On 4 August, the Minister of Territorial Administration and Infrastructure of Armenia, Gnel Sanosyan, stated that the construction of an alternative road to Lachin was actively underway and would be completed the spring of 2023. On 5 August, local Armenian authorities told the residents of Lachin, as well as Zabukh and Sus, to leave their homes by 25 August, after which the towns would be handed over to Azerbaijan. Some of the Armenian inhabitants burned their houses down. As of 26 August, Azerbaijan regained control of villages in the Lachin corridor, including Lachin, Sus, and Zabukh. Soon after, the alternate route to the south that passes by the villages of Mets Shen/Boyuk Galadarasi and Hin Shen/Kichik Galadarasi opened for use.

On 12 December 2022, citizens of Azerbaijan claiming to be "eco-activists" launched a blockade of the Lachin corridor, leaving 1,100 people, including 270 children, unable to return to their homes. This was followed by Azerbaijan cutting off the gas supply from Armenia to Nagorno-Karabakh (between 13 and 16 December), putting the 120,000 Armenian residents of Nagorno-Karabakh at risk of humanitarian crisis. The blockade was condemned by France, Greece, the Netherlands, Russia, Canada, and a number of other countries. The issue was also discussed in the Parliamentary Assembly of the Council of Europe.

On April 23, 2023, Azerbaijani officials set up a checkpoint in the corridor, claiming it was meant to prevent "illegal" transport of military supplies and natural resources. These claims were earlier denied by Armenian authorities.

==== Detentions of Armenians ====
On 29 July 2023, Azerbaijani troops detained Vagif Khachatryan, an Armenian resident of Nagorno-Karabakh, while he was crossing through the Lachin corridor to Armenia for medical treatment. Khachatryan was part of a larger group travelling to Armenia with the help of the International Committee of the Red Cross. Khachatryan was then taken to Baku. Azerbaijani authorities allege that Khachatryan was involved in violence against Azerbaijanis in the village of Meshali during the First Nagorno-Karabakh War, charging him with "genocide" and "deportation or forced movement of the population" under Azerbaijan's Criminal Code.

On 28 August 2023, three young Armenian men from Nagorno-Karabakh, Alen Sargsyan, Vahe Hovsepyan and Levon Grigoryan, were detained by Azerbaijani security forces while passing through the Lachin corridor to Armenia. The men were being escorted by Russian peacekeepers. Azerbaijani authorities and media said that the men were being charged with "disrespecting the Azerbaijani flag" in a 2021 social media video. The three men were later said to have had their criminal charges dropped "considering the age of the accused individuals, their sincere remorse, and compliance with the requirements of procedural legislation." According to the APA news agency, the three will spend 10 days in administrative detention before being expelled from Azerbaijan.

==== Expulsion of Nagorno-Karabakh Armenians ====
After Azerbaijan launched a military offensive in September 2023, Azerbaijani forces took control over the entirety of Nagorno-Karabakh, and subsequently expelled almost all the Armenians of Nagorno-Karabakh into Armenia through the Lachin corridor.

== See also ==
- Lachin offensive
