= Suarası =

Suarasy Azerbaijani: Suarası
- Location within Azerbaijan Location within East Zangezur Economic Region
- Coordinates: 39°33′49″N 46°40′12″E
- Country: Azerbaijan
- District: Lachin

Population (2005)
  - Total: 8
- Time zone: UTC+4 (AZT)

Suarasy (Azerbaijani: Suarası, lit. 'between water') is a village in the Lachin District of Azerbaijan.

== History ==
The village was located in the Armenian-occupied territories surrounding Nagorno-Karabakh, coming under the control of ethnic Armenian forces during the First Nagorno-Karabakh War in the early 1990s. The village subsequently became part of the breakaway Republic of Artsakh as part of its Kashatagh Province, referred to as Suaras (Armenian: Սուարաս). It was returned to Azerbaijan as part of the 2020 Nagorno-Karabakh ceasefire agreement.
