= İşıqlı, Fuzuli =

İşıqlı
- Location within Azerbaijan Location within Karabakh Economic Region
- Coordinates: 39°34′30″N 47°09′42″E
- Country: Azerbaijan
- District: Fuzuli
- Time zone: UTC+4 (AZT)

İşıqlı (also, Ishikhly and Ishygly) is a village in the Fuzuli District of Azerbaijan. It was occupied by Armenian forces during the Nagorno-Karabakh war, but was re-captured by Azerbaijan on 17 October 2020.
