= Qaladərəsi =

Village in Azerbaijan

Coordinates: 39°38′N 46°36′E

Qaladərəsi is a village in the municipality of Keçmədin in the Shamakhi Rayon of Azerbaijan.
