= Israfil Shahverdiyev =

National Hero of Azerbaijan

- İsrafil Şahverdiyev
- Born: June 11, 1952; Unannovu, Lachin, Azerbaijan SSR
- Died: January 13, 1994 (aged 41); Fuzuli, Azerbaijan
- Military career
- Allegiance: Azerbaijan
- Branch: Azerbaijani Armed Forces
- Service years: 1991–1994
- Conflicts: First Nagorno-Karabakh War
- Awards: National Hero of Azerbaijan; 1995

Israfil Shahverdi oglu Shahverdiyev (Azerbaijani: İsrafil Şahverdi oğlu Şahverdiyev; 11 June 1952, in Unannovu, Lachin, Azerbaijan SSR – 13 January 1994, in Fuzuli, Azerbaijan) was the National Hero of Azerbaijan and warrior during the First Nagorno-Karabakh War.

== Early life and education ==
Shahverdiyev was born on 11 June 1952 in Unannovu village of Lachin Rayon of Azerbaijan SSR. He went to Secondary School in Unannovu between 1959 and 1969. From 1971 through 1974, Shahverdiyev served in the Soviet Armed Forces. In 1975, he started to work as a police officer in the Lachin District Department of Internal Affairs.

=== Personal life ===
Shahverdiyev was married and had three children.

== Nagorno-Karabakh war ==
When Armenians attacked the territories of Azerbaijan, Shahverdiyev voluntarily went to the front-line. He captured two Armenian intelligence agents in the Qaladeresi village of the Shamakhi Rayon of Azerbaijan. Shahverdiyev played an important role in finding the murders of journalist Salatyn Asgerova who was killed during the First Nagorno-Karabakh War.

In 1991, a plan was prepared for the release of the village of Qala deresi. In the battle that lasted until the morning, Armenian armed forces had to withdraw, leaving heavy losses. Shahverdiyev participated in several battles for the villages of Hoçaz qayası and Hoçaz.

On January 6, 1994, Shahverdiyev participated in the battle for the liberation of the villages of Fuzuli District with his soldiers. Seven days later on January 13, 1994, he was killed in a battle while he was trying to rescue his soldiers.

== Honors ==
Israfil Shahverdi oglu Shahverdiyev was posthumously awarded the title of the "National Hero of Azerbaijan" by Presidential Decree No. 262 dated 15 January 1995. .

- "Sultan bey" award - 1990.

== Memorial ==
Shahverdiyev was buried at a Martyrs' Lane cemetery in Baku. One of the secondary schools in Lachin District was named after him.

== See also ==
- First Nagorno-Karabakh War
- List of National Heroes of Azerbaijan

== Sources ==
- "İsrafilin gündəliyindən sətirlər", "Şərq" qəzeti. - 2011. - 29 iyul. - Səh.5.
- "Laçınlı Milli Qəhrəmanlar: İsrafil Şahverdiyev", "Laçın yurdu" jurnalı, No.1(1), 2011, Bakı, "Elm və təhsil", 2011.
- Vugar Asgarov. Azərbaycanın Milli Qəhrəmanları (Yenidən işlənmiş II nəşr). Bakı: "Dərələyəz-M", 2010, səh. 267.
