= İşıqlı, Qubadli =

Ishygly Azerbaijani: İşıqlı
- Location within Azerbaijan
- Coordinates: 39°23′55″N 46°39′36″E
- Country: Azerbaijan
- District: Qubadli

Population (2015)
  - Total: 168
- Time zone: UTC+4 (AZT)

Ishygly (Azerbaijani: İşıqlı) is a village in the Qubadli District of Azerbaijan.

== History ==
The village was located in the Armenian-occupied territories surrounding Nagorno-Karabakh, coming under the control of ethnic Armenian forces on 23 August 1993 during the First Nagorno-Karabakh War in the early 1990s. The village subsequently became part of the breakaway Republic of Artsakh as part of its Kashatagh Province, referred to as Urekan (Armenian: Ուռեկան). It was recaptured on 2 November 2020 during the Lachin offensive by Azerbaijan during the 2020 Nagorno-Karabakh war.

== Notable people ==
- Alakbar Aliyev — National Hero of Azerbaijan.
