= Hin Shen =

Village in Shusha, Azerbaijan

Hin Shen / Kichik Galadarasi Հին Շեն / Kiçik Qaladərəsi
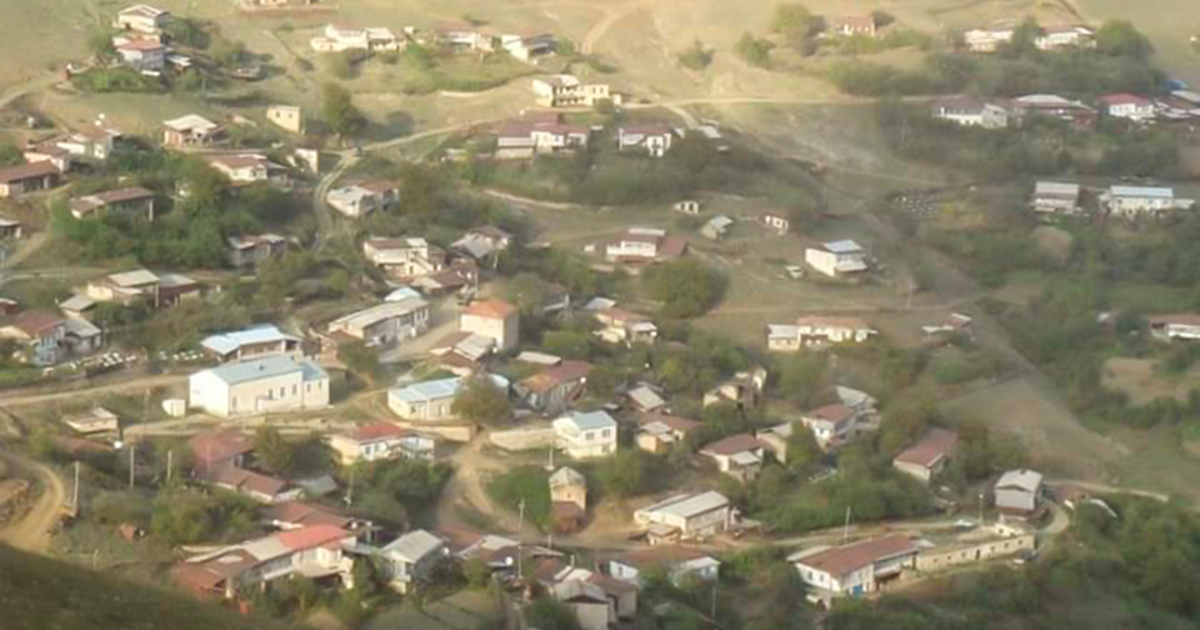
- Interactive map of Hin Shen / Kichik Galadarasi
- Location within Azerbaijan
- Coordinates: 39°38′14″N 46°36′10″E
- Country: Azerbaijan
- District: Shusha

Population (2015)
  - Total: 190
- Time zone: UTC+4

Hin Shen (Armenian: Հին Շեն, also Hinshen, Հինշեն) or Kichik Galadarasi (Azerbaijani: Kiçik Qaladərəsi) is a village in the Shusha District of Azerbaijan, in the region of Nagorno-Karabakh. Until 2023 it was controlled by the breakaway Republic of Artsakh. The village had an ethnic Armenian-majority population until the expulsion of the Armenian population of Nagorno-Karabakh by Azerbaijan following the 2023 Azerbaijani offensive in Nagorno-Karabakh.

== Toponymy ==
The village was known as Kirov (Russian: Киров) during the Soviet period, and is also known as Koynashen.

== History ==
During the Soviet period, the village was a part of the Shusha District of the Nagorno-Karabakh Autonomous Oblast.

== Historical heritage sites ==
Historical heritage sites in and around the village include the medieval caravanserai of Pulen Glukh (Armenian: Փուլեն Գլուխ), a church built in 1658, and the 19th-century church of Surb Astvatsatsin (Armenian: Սուրբ Աստվածածին, lit. 'Holy Mother of God').

== Economy and culture ==
The population is mainly engaged in agriculture and animal husbandry. As of 2015, the village has a municipal building, a house of culture, a school, and a medical centre.

== Demographics ==
The village had 176 inhabitants in 2005, and 190 inhabitants in 2015.
