= Lachin =

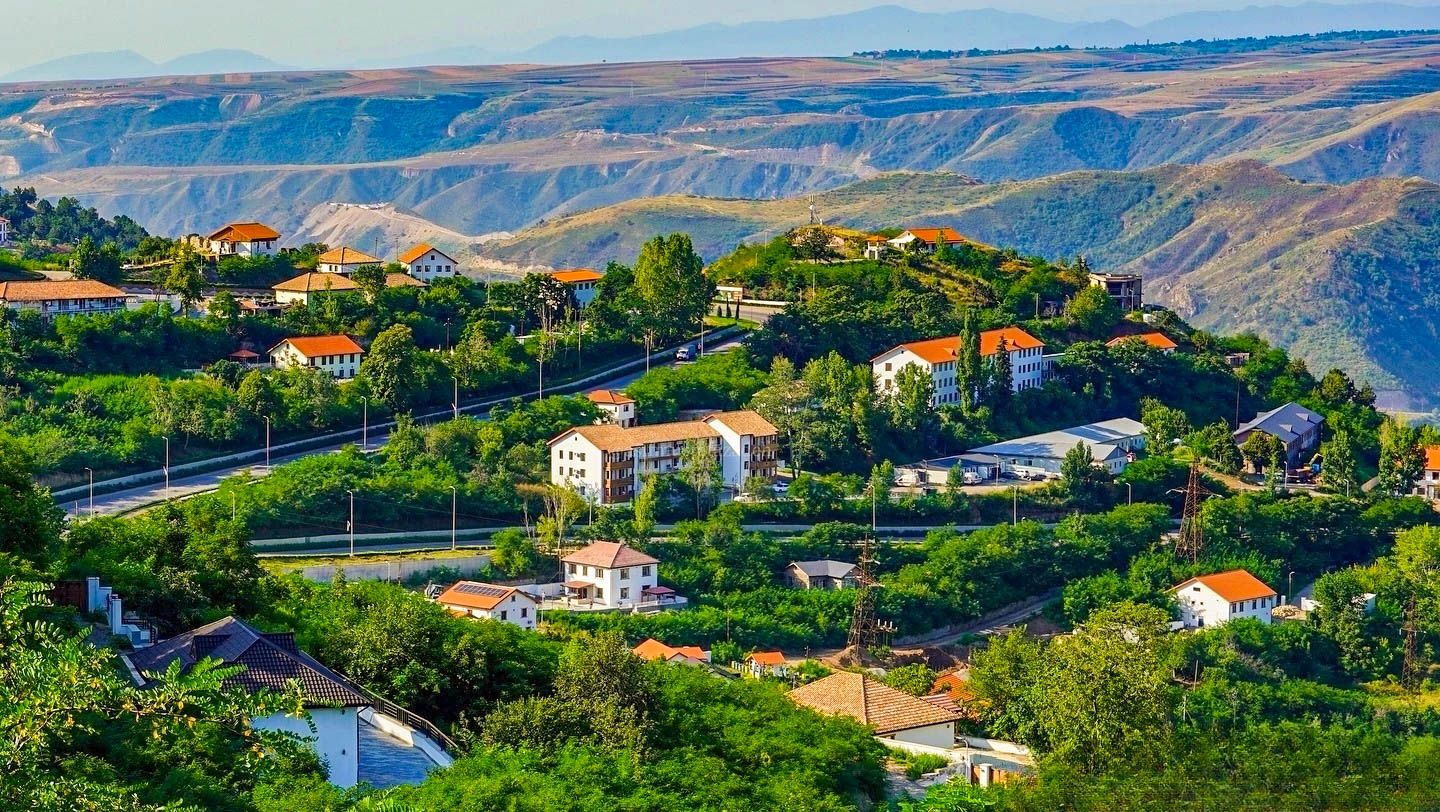
- General view of the Lachin town in 2024

- Location within Azerbaijan Location within East Zangezur Economic Region
- Coordinates: 39°38′27″N 46°32′49″E
- Country: Azerbaijan
  - District: Lachin

Government
  - Mayor: Agil Nazarli

Population (2025)
  - Total: 2,190
- Time zone: UTC+4 (UTC)

Lachin (Azerbaijani: Laçın,, lit. 'falcon') or Berdzor (Armenian: Բերձոր) is a town in Azerbaijan and the administrative centre of the Lachin District. It is located within the strategic Lachin corridor, linking the Nagorno-Karabakh region with Armenia.

The town was under control of Armenian forces in 1992, during the First Nagorno-Karabakh War, and its local Azerbaijani and Kurdish population was expelled, while Armenians settled in. The town came under the de facto control of the breakaway Republic of Artsakh, administered as part of its Kashatagh Province. It came under the supervision of the Russian peacekeeping force following the ceasefire agreement that ended the 2020 Nagorno-Karabakh war. Lachin and the villages of Sus and Zabukh were returned under Azerbaijan's control on August 26, 2022, as part of the 2020 ceasefire agreement.

== History ==
=== Early history ===
Cuneiform inscriptions dating back to the Urartian period have been found in the caves surrounding the town. The area was first mentioned by Armenian sources as Berdadzor (Armenian: Բերդաձոր), a canton of the historic Artsakh province of Greater Armenia; it was alternatively transcribed as Beradzor, Berdzor, or Berdzork. The reputed author Movses Kaghankatvatsi mentions a so-called Berdzor horse purportedly indigenous to the region, as does Makar Barkhudaryan, an Apostolic bishop, traveler, polymath, and ethnographer from Shusha. During the medieval period, the town Berdzor was mentioned as being a part of the Artsakh province within the domain of the Armenian Bagratid Kingdom.

Jalal al-Din Mangburni's private secretary Shihab ad-Din an-Nasawi referred to the settlement as both Berdadzor and a new name, Kaladara.

Berdzor had its own local Meliks during the 15th-17th centuries and fell under the jurisdiction of the Armenian Melikdom of Kashatagh. The Armenian settlement of Berdzor was eventually abandoned. Following the displacement of the Armenian population, the area was then repopulated with Kurdish tribes. The modern settlement was built using the stones from the ancient Armenian settlement.

The town was formerly also known as Abdallar, named after the Turkic Abdal tribe. In 1914, Abdallar was a small relatively insignificant village of about 124 Tatars. It was granted town status in 1923 and then renamed Lachin (a Turkic first name meaning falcon) in 1926.

In the early 1920s, Vladimir Lenin's letter to Nariman Narimanov "had implied that Lachin was to be included in Azerbaijan, but the authorities in Baku and Yerevan were given promises that were inevitably contradictory."

=== Nagorno-Karabakh conflict ===
==== First Nagorno-Karabakh War ====
The town and hinterland of Lachin was the location of severe fighting during the First Nagorno-Karabakh War (1990–1994).

During May 1992, an Armenian offensive captured the town; as a result, Lachin became a strategic link between Armenia and the Nagorno-Karabakh region -the Lachin corridor. The disfigured bodies of Armenian civilians killed by Azerbaijani soldiers in 1992 were discovered near Lachin on May 28, 1993. The civilians had attempted to flee Nagorno-Karabakh to Armenia and were reportedly massacred by the Grey Wolves.

Following the town's capture by Armenian forces, it was looted and burned. The mainly Azerbaijani population fled and became internally displaced people. British reporters witnessed looting and burning in Lachin, with trucks and cars piled high with looted furniture and household utensils moving to Armenia, and big convoys blocking the road. Looters took everything of value, including livestock, before setting houses on fire. An Armenian sergeant said to the British journalists that the looting was done because the Azerbaijanis had previously pillaged 23 villages. Among the Armenian looters there also were civilians from Stepanakert, which had been shelled by the Azerbaijanis for eight months and had been without power and water for several weeks. A Canadian journalist who visited the town a few months later noted that "the destruction is absolute. No building, no home, no school, not a bus shelter has been left unscarred".

A Kurdish nationalist organization in the area, the "Caucasian Kurdistan Freedom Movement", proclaimed the establishment of the Kurdish Republic of Lachin, after Armenian troops entered the town. However, most of the local Kurdish population had by then fled, and the attempt quickly proved abortive.

Lachin was then transferred to be administrated by the Republic of Artsakh as part of its Kashatagh Province. Artsakh repopulated the city by attracting ethnic Armenians from Armenia and Lebanon. According to journalist Onnik Krikorian, although the official statistics claimed that the number of Armenian residents in Lachin was 2200, the actual figure was around 50% less. While some settlers were refugees from Azerbaijan and Karabakh, as well as from the diaspora, Krikorian wrote that most were poor families from Armenia, attracted by the promise of land, livestock and social benefits that averaged 4,000 Armenian drams (about ten US dollars) per child. Krikorian also wrote that the Armenian population was leaving the region due to decreased government funding and the uncertainty of region's status.

The OSCE Minsk Group co-chairs had noted that "Lachin has been treated as a separate case in previous negotiations." The Lachin corridor and the Kalbajar district had been at the centre of Armenian demands during the Nagorno-Karabakh peace talks with Azerbaijan.

On June 16, 2015, the European Court of Human Rights passed a judgement in the case of Chiragov and Others v. Armenia, which concerned the complaints by six Azerbaijani ethnically-Kurdish refugees that they were unable to return to their homes and property in the district of Lachin, in Azerbaijan, from where they had been forced to flee in 1992 during the Armenian-Azerbaijani conflict over Nagorno-Karabakh. The Court confirmed that Armenia exercised effective control over Nagorno-Karabakh and the surrounding territories and thus had de facto jurisdiction over the district of Lachin. The Court also found that the denial by the Armenian government of access to the applicants’ homes constituted an unjustified interference with their right to respect for their private and family lives as well as their homes.

==== 2020 Nagorno-Karabakh war ====
Following the ceasefire agreement that ended the 2020 Nagorno-Karabakh war, the Lachin District was returned to Azerbaijan on December 1. Today, Russian peacekeepers continue to secure safe passage through the Lachin corridor. However, the unclear and unstable situation in the region have caused many Armenians to evacuate from the city.

The Artsakh mayor of Lachin, Narek Aleksanyan, first called on the ethnic Armenian population of the town to evacuate. However, later Aleksanyan stated that the agreement had been changed and that Lachin, Sus, and Zabukh which are located inside the Lachin corridor would not be handed over to Azerbaijan, urging the Armenian population to stay in their homes. Despite Aleksanyan's calls, the vast majority of Armenians in Lachin, as well as Lebanese-Armenians in Zabukh fled the region. Azerbaijani MP Zahid Oruj, the chairman of the Center for Social Research, which is linked to the Azerbaijani government, denied that the Lachin District would not be handed over in its entirety.

On December 1, Azerbaijani forces, with tanks and a column of trucks, entered the district, and the Azerbaijani MoD released footage from the Lachin district. On December 3, the Azerbaijani Ministry of Defence released video footage from the town of Lachin.

Following the ceasefire, only around 200 Armenians remained in the Lachin corridor, with 100–120 of them being in Lachin.

=== Return to Azerbaijan ===
According to the president of Azerbaijan Ilham Aliyev, a new corridor was going to be built in the region as the Lachin corridor passes through the city of Lachin, and when this corridor is ready, the city will be returned to the Azerbaijani administration.

In August 2022, Azerbaijan built its part of the road around Lachin, while Armenia did not yet. On August 2, the local Armenian authorities reported that the Azerbaijani side had conveyed to them a demand to organise communication with Armenia along a different route, bypassing the existing one. Following the renewed clashes around Lachin, Secretary of the Security Council of Armenia, Armen Grigoryan, stated that Azerbaijan's demand for the Lachin corridor was unlawful, since the Armenian side has not yet agreed to any plan for the construction of a new road. Azerbaijan accused Armenia of delaying the construction of its part of the road, while the part for which Azerbaijan was responsible had already been built. On August 4, the Minister of Territorial Administration and Infrastructure of Armenia, Gnel Sanosyan, stated that the construction of an alternative road to Lachin was actively underway and would be completed the spring of 2023. On August 5, local Armenian authorities told the residents of Lachin, as well as Zabukh and Sus, to leave their homes by August 25, after which the towns would be handed over to Azerbaijan. Some of the Armenian inhabitants burned their houses down. As of August 26, Azerbaijan regained control of the town and the villages Sus and Zabukh in the Lachin corridor.

In May 2024, satellite imagery showed that the Armenian church of St. Ascension had been completely demolished by the Azerbaijani government, with no trace of it left.

== Geography ==
The town is scenically built on the side of a mountain on the left bank of the river Hakari.

=== Climate ===
Climate data for Lachin(normals for 1936-1991)
Month	Jan	Feb	Mar	Apr	May	Jun	Jul	Aug	Sep	Oct	Nov	Dec	Year
Average precipitation mm (inches)	24.7 (0.97)	27.2 (1.07)	48.4 (1.91)	62.1 (2.44)	96.0 (3.78)	82.2 (3.24)	32.9 (1.30)	29.7 (1.17)	39.9 (1.57)	52.3 (2.06)	34.5 (1.36)	23.9 (0.94)	553.8 (21.81)
Source: NCEI

== Economy and culture ==
As of 2015, the population is mainly engaged in different state institutions. The town has a municipal building, a regional hospital, four dental clinics, two secondary schools, the Berdzor Music School and the Berdzor Art and Sports School, and a kindergarten.

== Demographics ==
Year	Population	Ethnic groups	Source
1907	145	Mostly Tatars (later known as Azerbaijanis)	Caucasian Calendar
1914	124	Mostly Tatars	Caucasian Calendar
1926	435	37.7% Turks (Azerbaijanis), 25.3% Kurds, 15.2% Armenians, 13.1% Russians	Soviet census
1939	1,063	80.7% Azerbaijani, 11.6% Armenians, 6.4% Russians	Soviet census
1959	2,329	94.5% Azerbaijani, 4.3% Armenians 1% Russians	Soviet census
1970	4,990	95% Azerbaijani, 2.7% Russians & Ukrainians, 1.1% Armenians	Soviet census
1979	6,073	99.1% Azerbaijani	Soviet census
1989	7,829		Soviet census
2005	2,190	~100% Armenian	NKR census
2015	1,900	~100% Armenian	NKR estimate
2021	100–120	~100% Armenian	
2022	100–120	~100% Azerbaijani	

== Transport ==
- Road

Kalbajar-Laçın Highway

- Airport

Lachin International Airport

== Twin cities ==
Lachin is twinned with:

- (United States) Highland, California (only as Berdzor of the former Republic of Artsakh)
- Irpin, Ukraine

== Notable people ==
- Rovshan Javadov (19 October 1951 – March 17, 1995) was an officer in the Azerbaijani Armed Forces.
- Arif Pasha is a Soviet–Azerbaijani military officer, colonel of the Azerbaijani Armed Forces and politician.

== Gallery ==
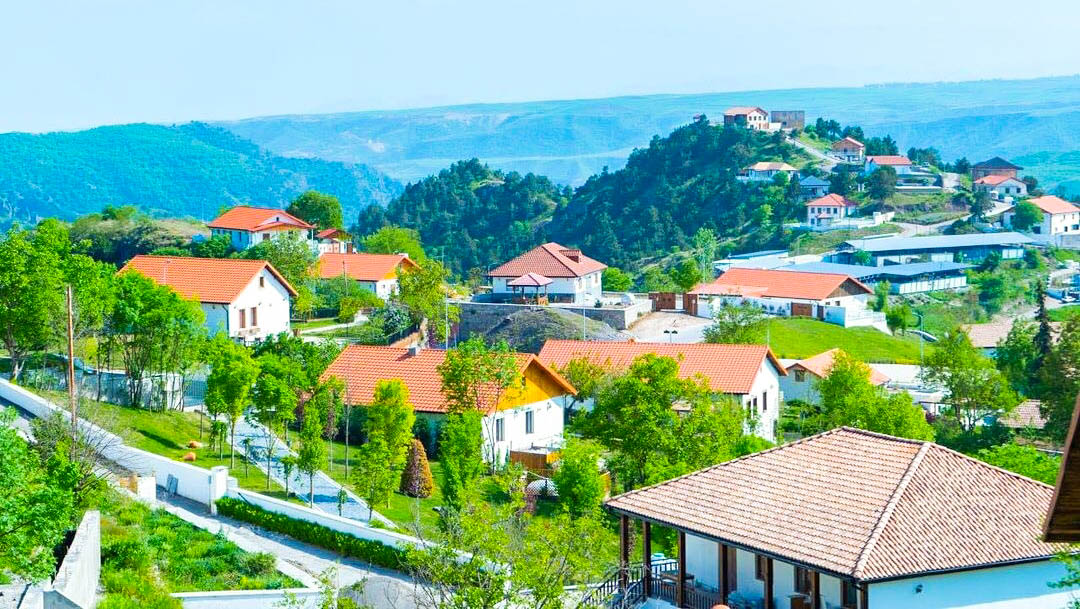
View of Laçın town in 2024.

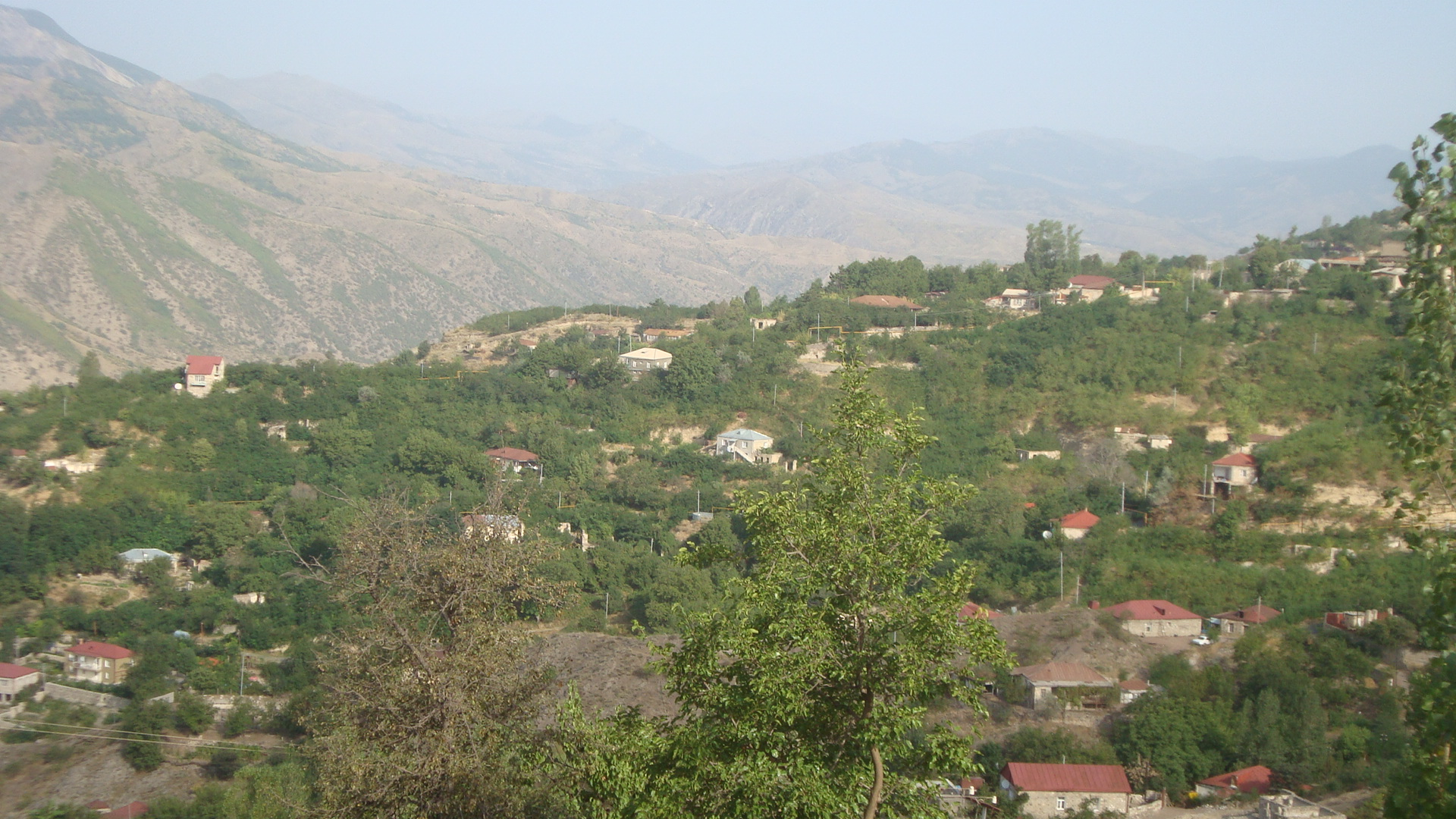
View of the town in 2010

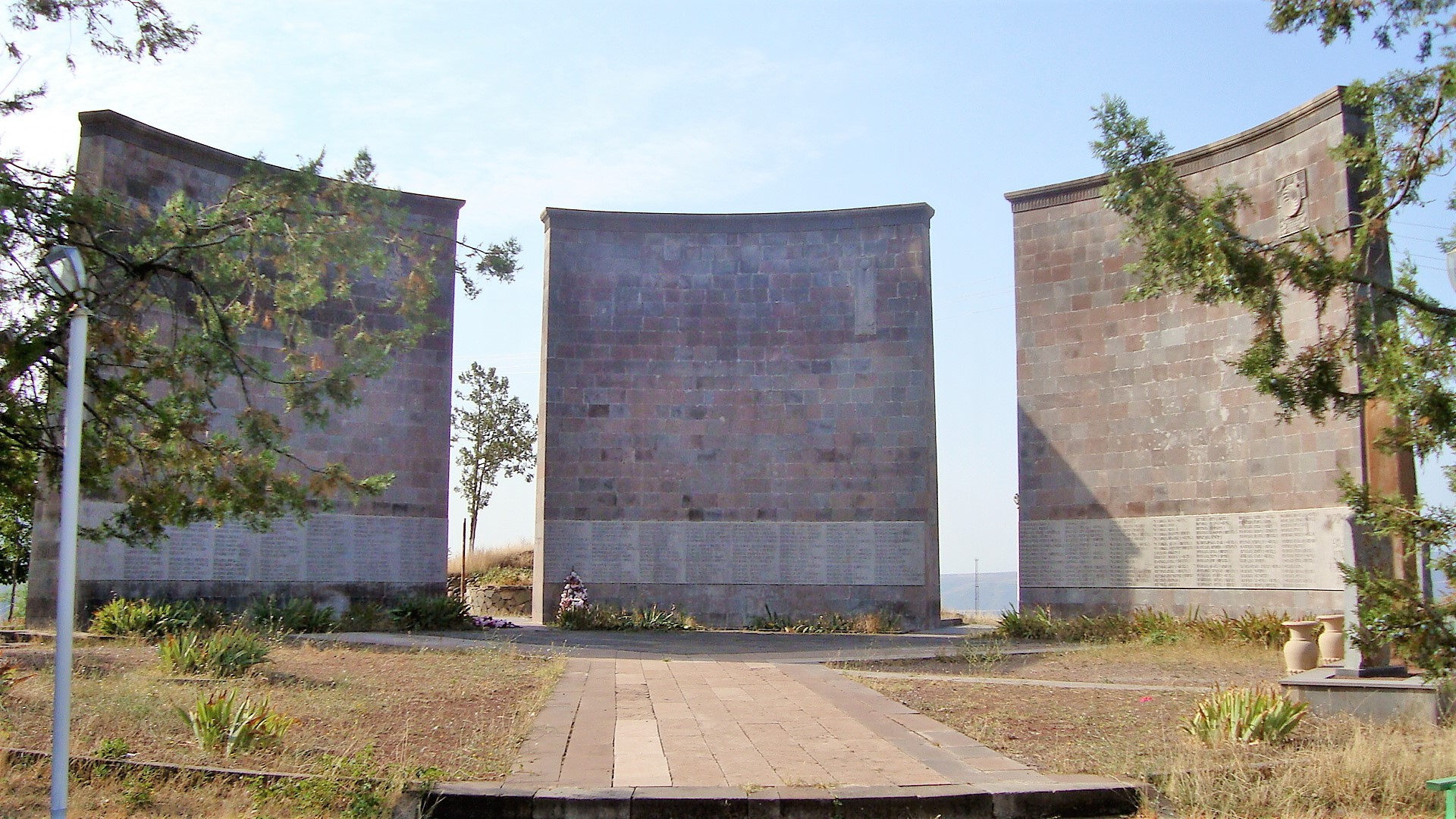
Former WW2 memorial turned into Nagorno-Karabakh conflict memorial

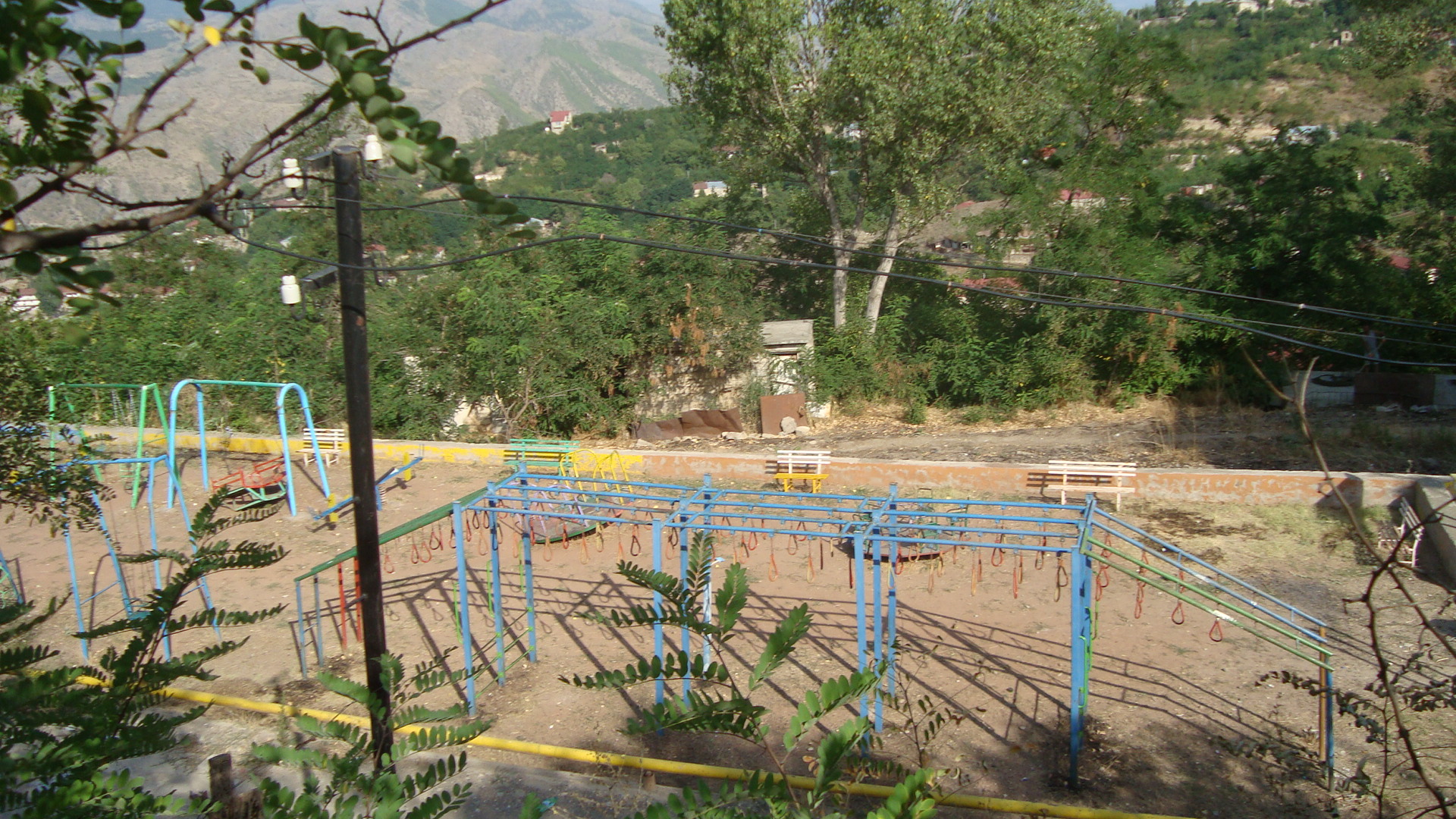
Playground in the town

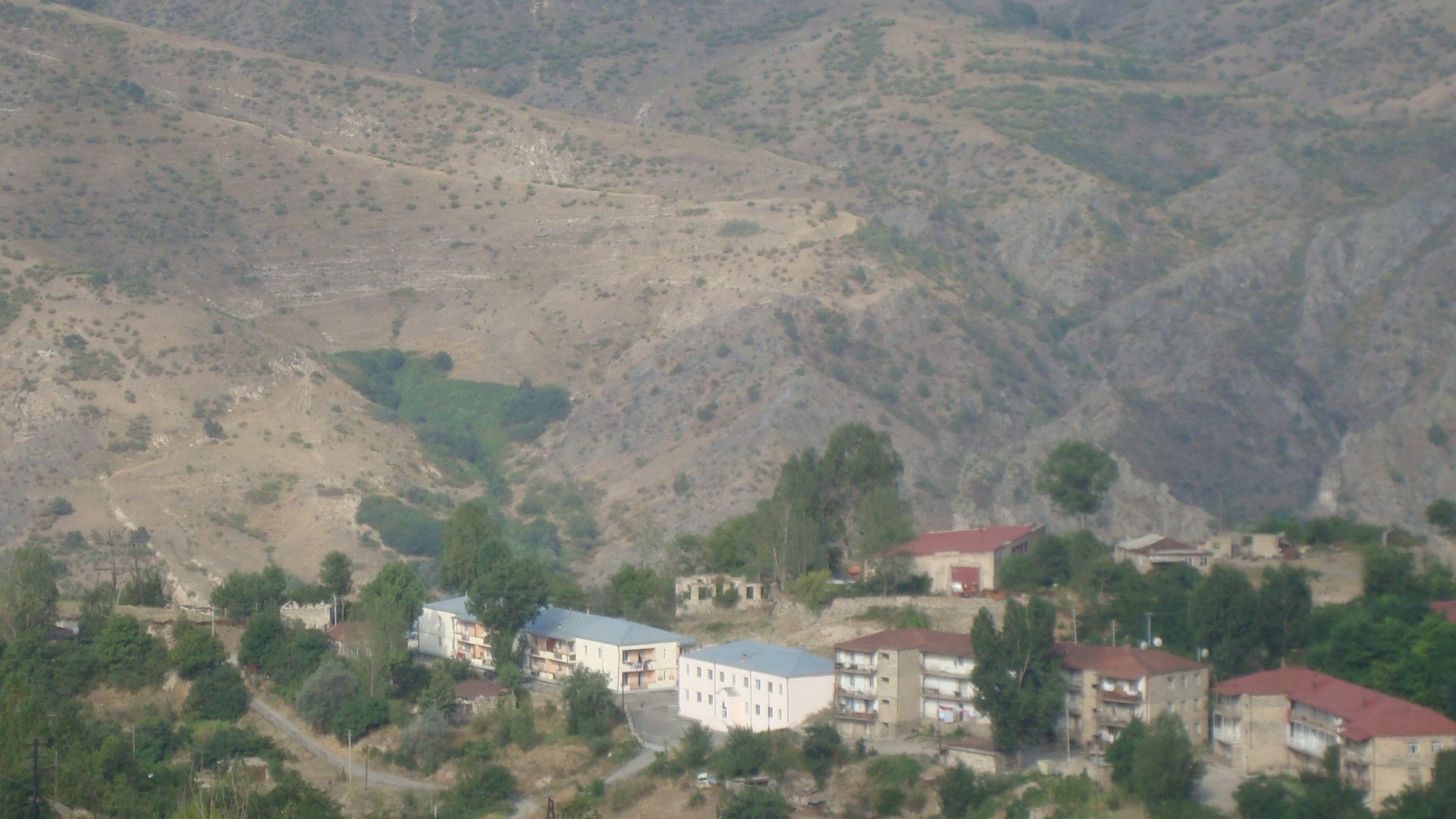
View of part of Lachin

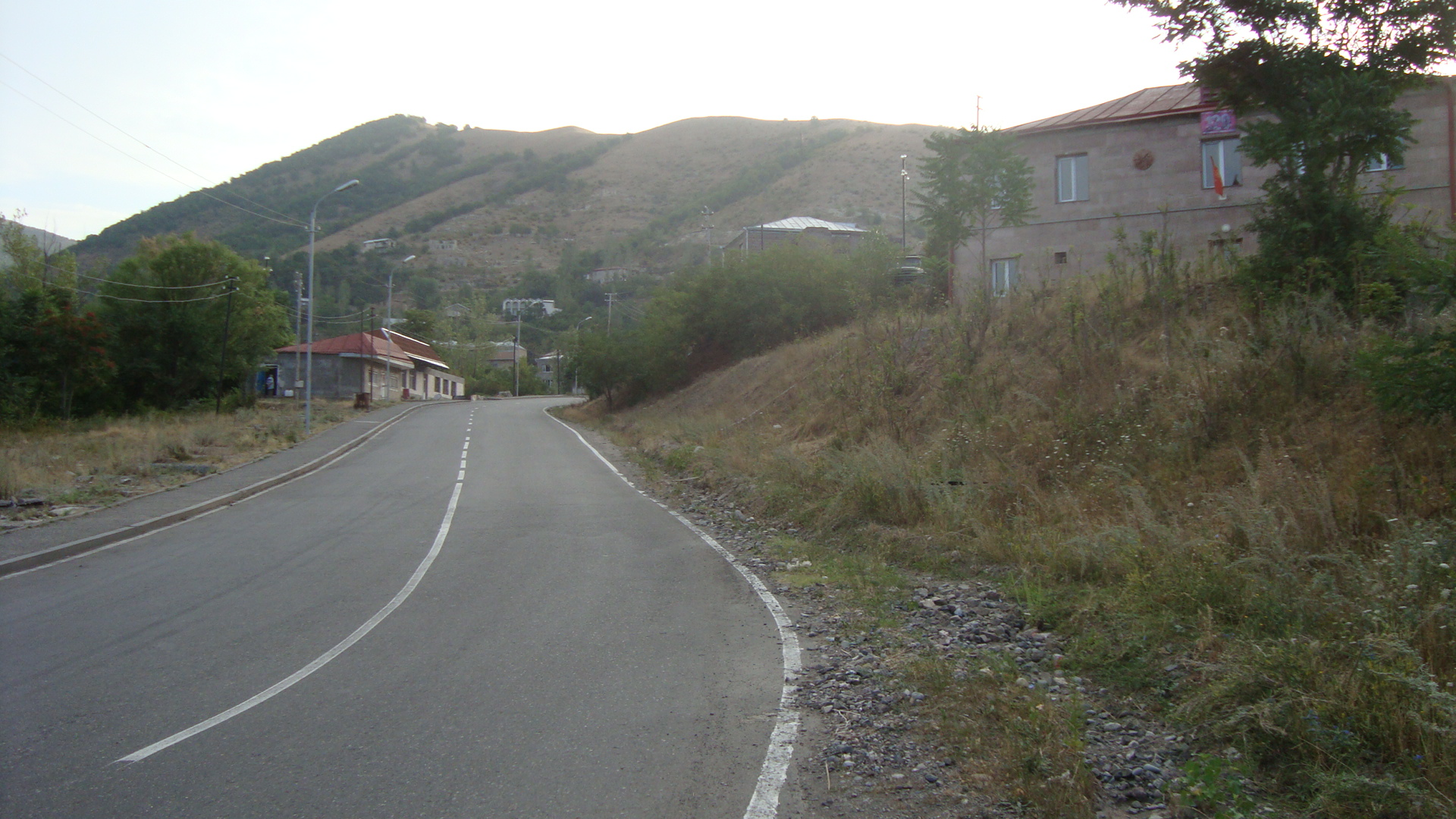
Road in Lachin

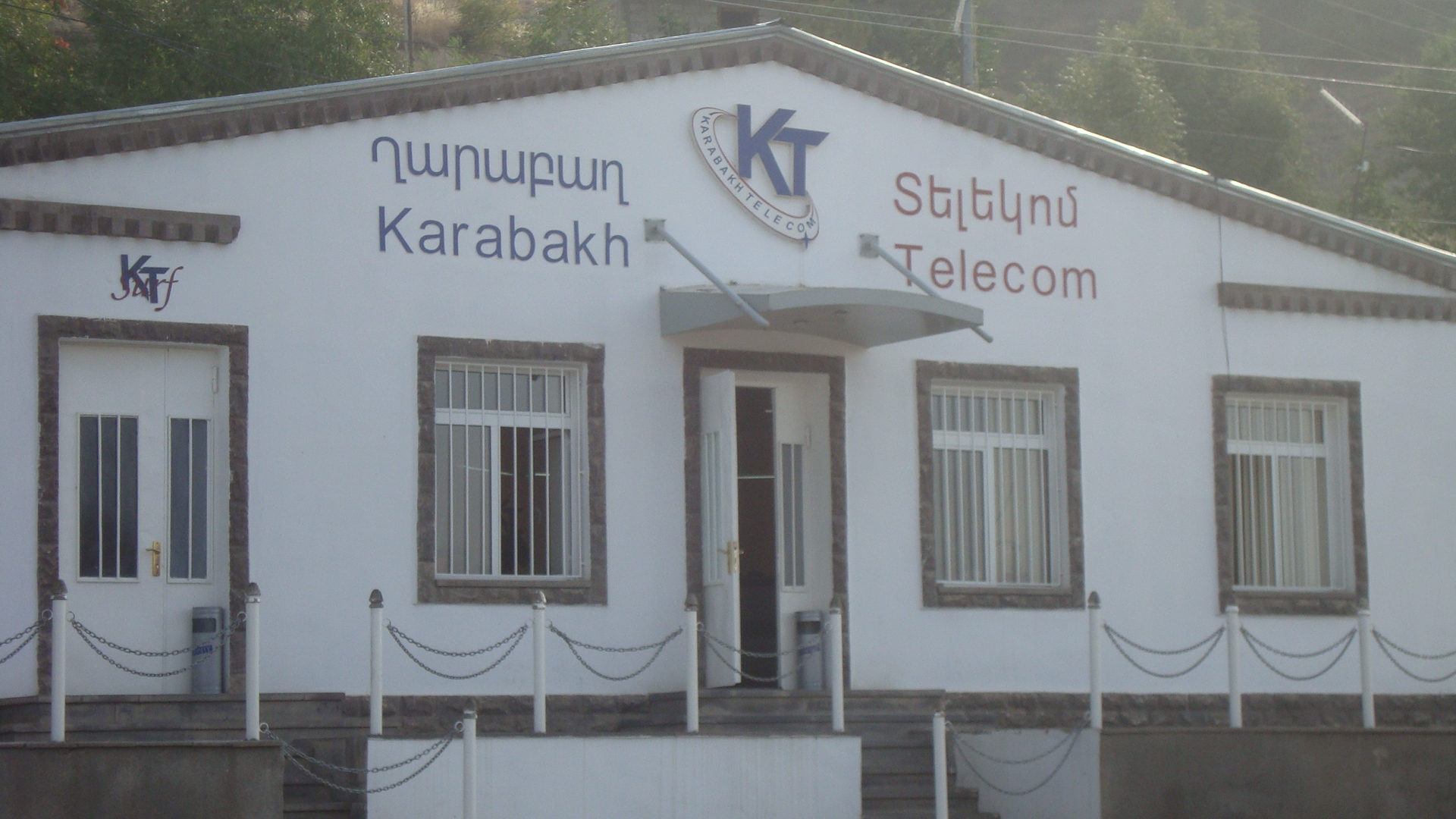
Building of Armenian mobile operator company

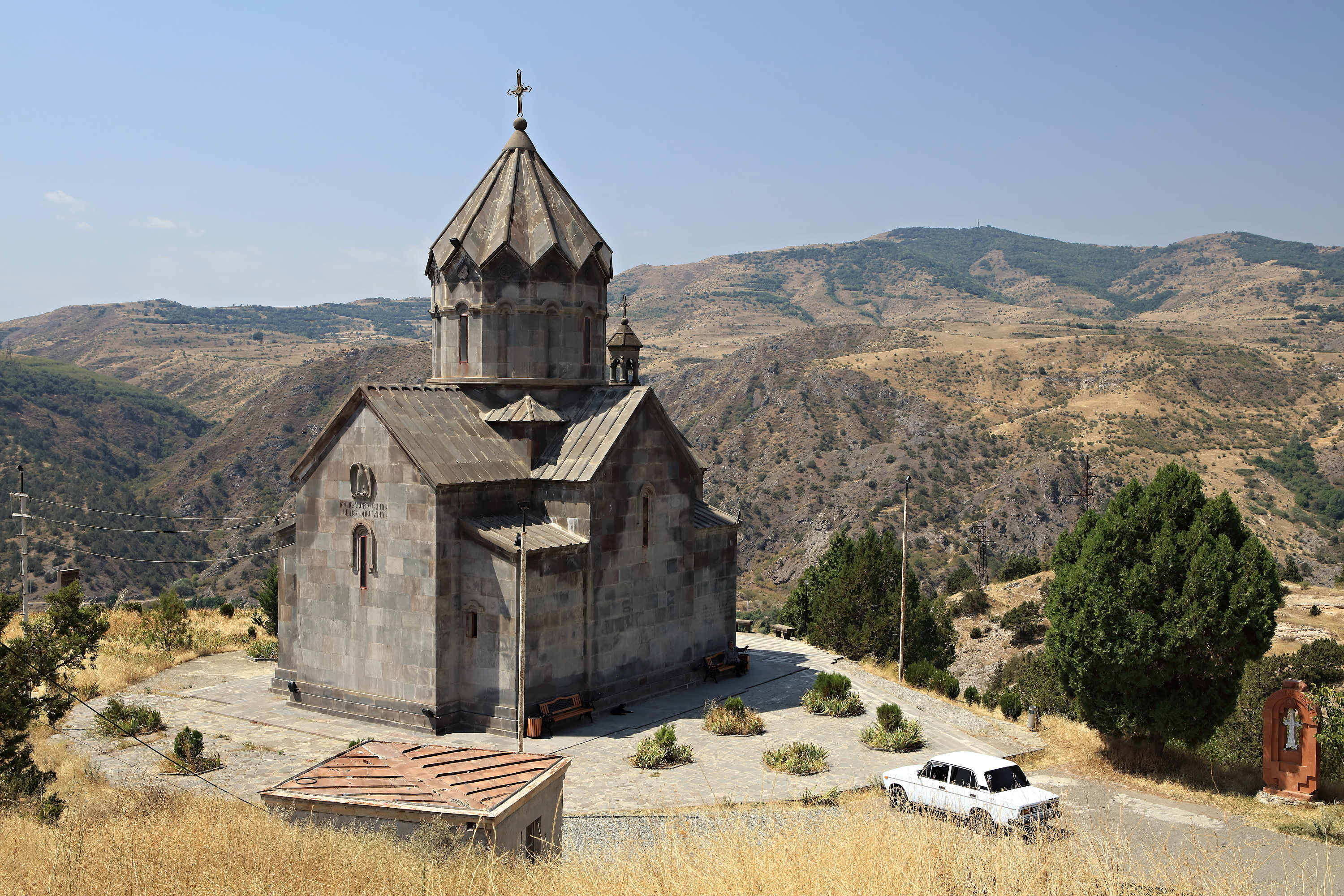
Holy Ascension Church in Berdzor, opened in 1998
