= Lachin District =

District in western Azerbaijan

Coordinates: 39°38′0″N 46°33′0″E

- District
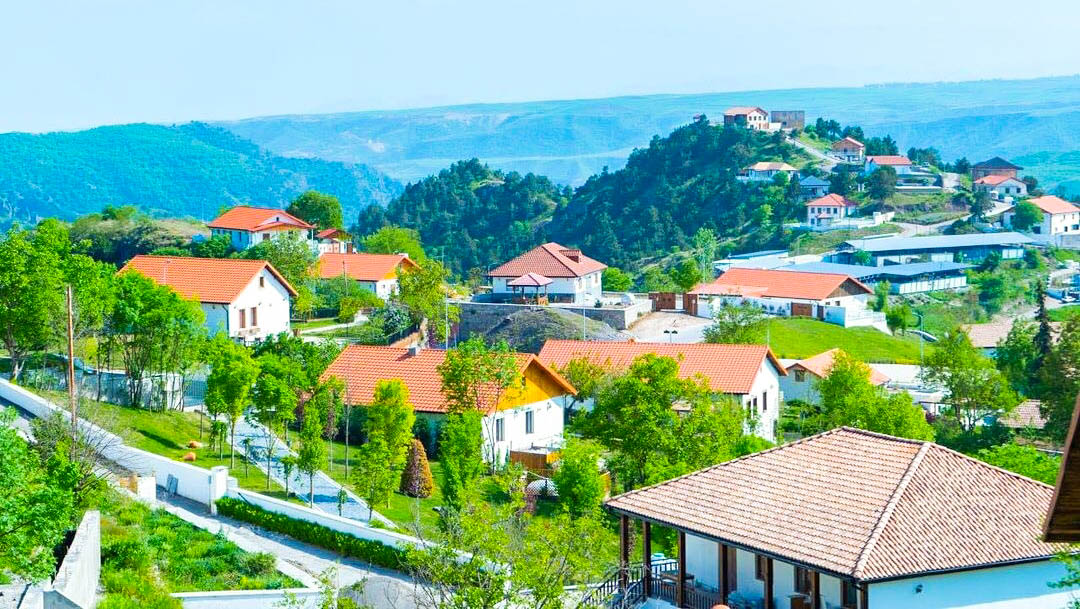
- View of Laçın town in 2024

- Map of Azerbaijan showing Lachin District
- Country: Azerbaijan
- Region: East Zangezur
- Established: 8 August 1930
- Capital: Lachin
- Settlements: 127

Government
  - Governor: Agil Nazarli

Area
  - Total: 1,840 km^{2} (710 sq mi)

Population (2020)
  - Total: 78,600
  - Density: 42.7/km^{2} (111/sq mi)
- Time zone: UTC+04:00 (AZT)
- Postal code: 4100
- Website: lachin-ih.gov.az

Lachin District (Azerbaijani: Laçın rayonu) is one of the 66 districts of Azerbaijan. It is located in the west of the country, belonging to the East Zangezur Economic Region. The district borders the districts of Kalbajar, Khojaly, Shusha, Khojavend, Qubadli, and the Syunik Province of Armenia. Its capital and largest city is Lachin. As of 2020, the district had a nominal population of 78,600.

The territory of the district was established in 1930 and given the status of a district. The district was occupied by the self-proclaimed Republic of Artsakh from 1992 until late 2020, when the district was surrendered to Azerbaijan per the 2020 Nagorno-Karabakh ceasefire agreement which ended the 2020 Nagorno-Karabakh War. A small part of the district, excluding its capital, called the Lachin corridor was controlled by a Russian peacekeeping force until 2024.

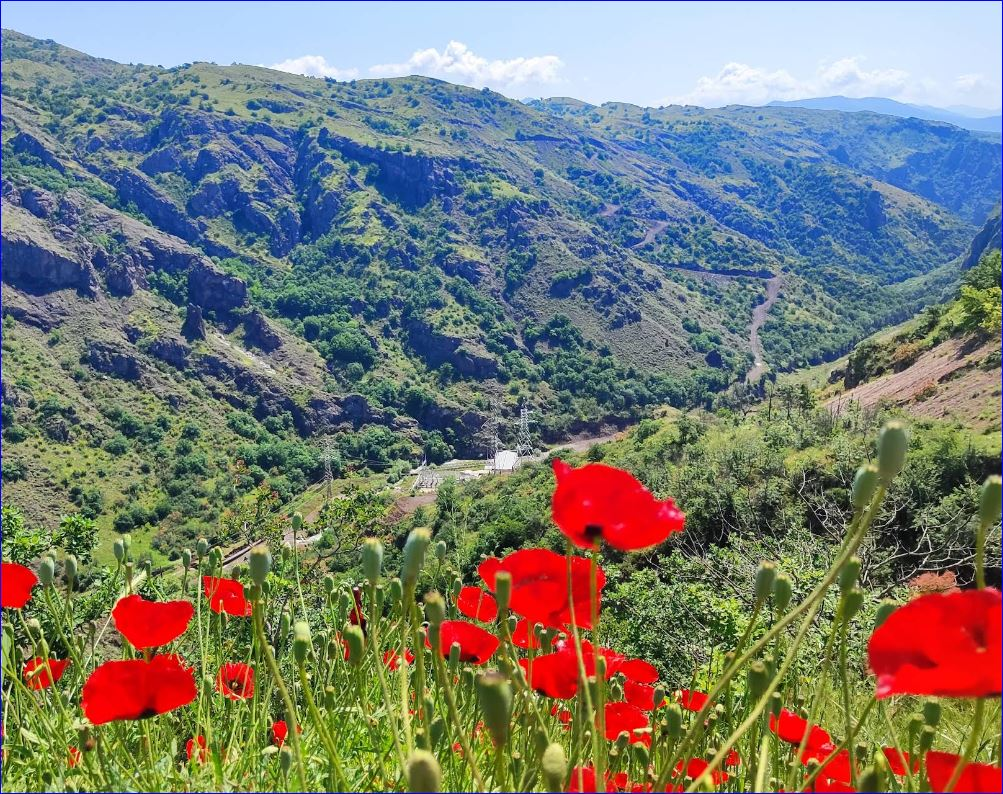
Misni Village, Lachin

== Demographics ==
In 1936, from a total of 20,356 people:

- Azerbaijanis 89,8% (18,288)
- Kurds 6,5% (1,329)
- Russians 2,1% (432)
- Armenians 1,1% (224)

In 1979, from a total of 47,261 people:

- Azerbaijanis 94.5% (44,665)
- Kurds 5.2% (2,437)
- Armenians 0.1% (34)

In 1981, the population was 51,000, counting 121 settlements. 9 of these settlements were Kurdish.

In 1989, the population was a total of 47,339 people.

== History ==
It was originally known as Abdalyar or Abdallyar (after the Turkic Abdal tribe). It was granted town status in 1923 and renamed Lachin (a Turkic first name meaning falcon) in 1926. Between 1923 and 1929, Lachin was established as the Kurdistan Uyezd, an autonomous Soviet district.

The district has one city, one settlement (Gayghi settlement) and 125 villages. It is located in the south-west of Azerbaijan and is predominantly mountainous. The district shares borders with Kalbajar district in the north, Khojaly, Shusha and Khojavand districts in the east, Gubadli district in the south and Armenia in the west.

Lachin district is an administrative rayon in the Republic of Azerbaijan. Established in 1930. Situated in the Lesser Caucasus, in the south-west of Azerbaijan. Bordered by Armenia on the west. It occupies an area of 1,835 square kilometres (708 sq mi), while the population is 68,900 (as of 01.01.2006). The capital is the city of Lachin.

The area is mountainous. Lachin extends to the south-western slope of Karabakh ridge on the east, to the south-eastern slope of Mikhtokan ridge on the north, to Karabakh plateau on the south-west. The highest point is the Qızılboga mountain (3594 m). Jurassic-anthropogenic sediments are spread. The rayon has mineral resources such as mercury, polymetals, building materials, Narzan-type mineral water springs. Mild warm and cold climate with dry winters prevails over most of the area. The average temperature is from −10–0 °C (14–32 °F) in January, to 10–22 °C (50–72 °F) in July. Annual precipitation is 600–900 millimetres (24–35 in). The rayon's river is Hakari and its tributaries. The most spread soil types are sod mountainous-meadow, brown mountainous-forest and carbonate mountainous-black. The vegetation comprises bushy and rare woods, deciduous mountain forests (oak, hornbeam, beech), sub-alpine and alpine meadows.

Lachin is an agricultural region. Cattle-breeding occupies has a major place in its economy.

There are 149 secondary schools, 2 pre-school and 5 extracurricular educational institutions, a vocational school, a children creativity center, 85 clubs, 119 libraries, 5 music schools, and 142 health facilities in the rayon.

The cave-temple (5th century), mausoleums (14th–19th century), a castle (17th century), a mosque (1718), a palace (1716), a bridge (18th century) are registered architectural monuments in the territory of Lachin.

Lachin was captured on May 18, 1992, by the Armenian armed forces during the First Nagorno-Karabakh War. As part of an agreement that ended the 2020 Nagorno-Karabakh War most of the district was returned to Azerbaijani control by 1 December 2020. This excludes the Lachin corridor which was controlled by Russian peacekeeping forces in accordance with the agreement.

== Notable people ==
- Gorkhmaz Eyvazov
- Rovshan Javadov
- Kamil Nasibov
- Arif Pasha
- Salim Salimov (politician)
- Israfil Shahverdiyev
- Shargiyya Veliyeva

== See also ==
- Armenian-occupied territories surrounding Nagorno-Karabakh
- Kurdistan uezd
