= Caucasian Kurds =

Subgroup of Kurds

Kurdên Kafkasyayê
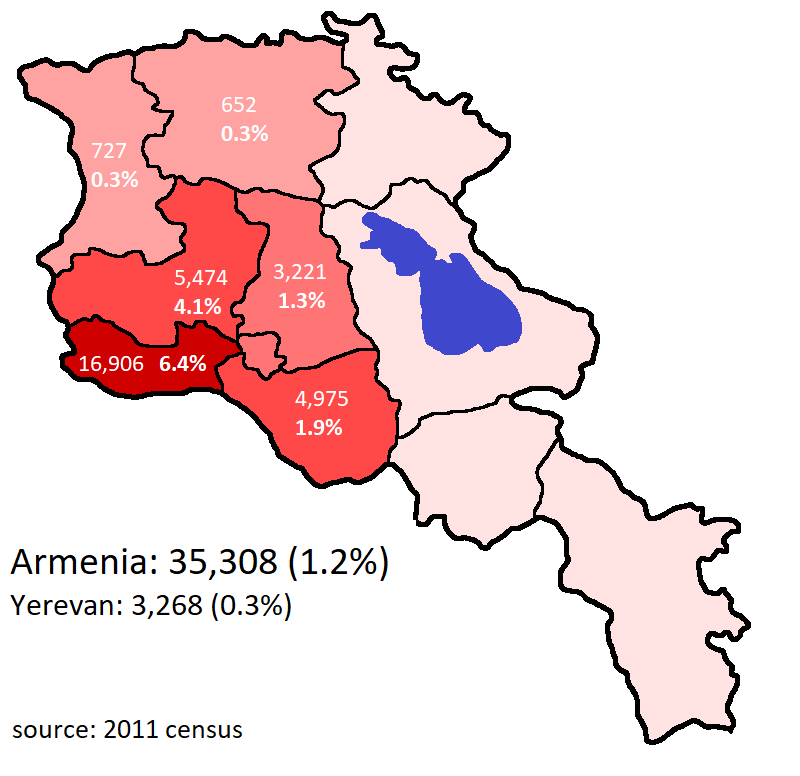
- Yazidis in Armenia, most Kurds in Armenia are Yazidi

Total population
- Unknown

Regions with significant populations
- Armenia, Azerbaijan, Georgia, Russia and Kazakhstan

Languages
- Kurdish (Kurmanji), Azeri, Armenian, Georgian, Russian and Kazakh

Religion
- Sunni Islam, Shia Islam, Christianity and Yazidism.

Related ethnic groups
- Kurds, Yazidis, and other Iranian peoples

Caucasian Kurds are ethnic Kurds who come from or live in the region of the Caucasus. The first Kurdish presence in the Caucasus region can be traced back to the middle of the 10th Century. Some groups of Caucasian Kurds were deported to Central Asia in 1937, 1938, and 1944 by the Soviet Union under Joseph Stalin, with most of their descendants now residing in Kazakhstan. The total number of Caucasian Kurds inside and outside the Caucasus region is unknown.

== Population ==
=== Armenia ===
According to the latest Armenian Census, 32,742 Kurds live in Armenia as of 2022. They mostly live in western Armenia (not to be confused with historical Western Armenia) and speak the Kurmanji dialect of Kurdish. The majority of the Kurdish Armenian population are Yazidis.

=== Georgia ===
According to the latest Georgian Census, 20,843 Kurds live in Georgia as of 2002. They speak Kurmanji and mostly live in Tbilisi and Rustavi.

=== Soviet Union (Historical) ===
In the Azerbaijan SSR, the administrative unit of Kurdistan Uezd had a population which was 74% Kurdish and 26% Azeri.

In the entire Soviet Union in 1959, there were 26,000 Kurds in Armenia, 16,000 in Georgia and more than 14,000 in Central Asia.

Population of Kurds in:
Country	Number	Year	Source
Armenia	32,742	2022	
Azerbaijan	70,000	2011	
Georgia	20,843–60,000	2014	
Kazakhstan	49,355	2023	
Russia	50,701	2021	

== Religion ==
=== In Armenia ===
The latest Armenian census from 2022 recorded 31,079 Yazidis and 1,663 non-Yazidi Kurds. In Armenia, Yazidis and Kurds are seen as two different ethnic groups.

=== In Georgia ===
In Georgia, Yazidis are seen as part of the Kurdish ethnicity by the Georgian government. The number of Yazidis in Georgia has steadily declined since 1989, from 30,000 in 1989, down to 18,000 by 2002, and then further down to 6,000 by 2015.

== History ==
=== Origins ===
The Shaddadids were the first Kurds who lived in the Caucasus, hailing from the Hadhabani tribe, which itself occasionally had a presence in Dvin (mediaeval Armenia) during the 10th century.

=== 10th–12th century ===
The first Kurdish presence in the Caucasus region (specifically the Transcaucasus) can be traced back to the mid-10th century when the Shaddadids established themselves at Dvin by its first emir Muhammad ibn Shaddad. The Shaddadids ruled between the Kura and Aras rivers until they fell in the end of the 12th century. During Shaddadid rule, they often engaged in war with the medieval Georgian Kingdom and occasionally with the Byzantine army.

=== 16th century ===
According to Grigory Chursin, at the time of the Ottoman–Safavid War (1578–1590) a wave of Kurdish immigration in western parts of modern Azerbaijan may have taken place in 1589 when soldiers chose to stay in the conquered lands.

=== 18th century ===
Kurdish tribes migrated to the Ararat Plain (modern day Armenia), in the 18th century.

In 1728, Kurds and Shahsevans who were breeding cattle in the Mughan plain applied for Russian citizenship.

In the late 18th century, Kurds arrived in Tbilisi to get assistance from King Erekle II against the Ottomans.

=== 19th century ===
When the Russian Empire and the Qajars signed the Treaty of Turkmenchay in 1828, Kurds were allowed to work in Georgia.

During the early 19th century, the policy of the Russian Empire towards their own and the greater Kurdish population was to keep them neutral in the wars against Qajar Iran and the Ottoman Empire. Around the same time, Kurds settled in Transcaucasia. In the late 19th and early 20th century, Yazidis who fled from the Ottoman Empire due to religious persecution settled in the Russian Transcaucasus.

During the two Russo-Persian Wars between the Russian Empire and Qajar Iran (Persia), the Russian authorities let Kurds settle in Russia proper and then Russian ruled Armenia. Later during the Crimean War and the Russo-Turkish War, Kurds again moved to Russia and Armenia.

=== 20th century ===
==== Armenia ====
A Kurdish representative was elected to the Armenian parliament of the First Republic of Armenia (1918–1920).

After the dissolution of the First Republic of Armenia and the founding of the Socialist Soviet Republic of Armenia (later Armenian SSR), the soviet policy of Korenizatsiia was enforced, leading to the founding of radio, press and education in Kurdish (Kurmanji), alongside the creation of a Kurdish alphabet using the Armenian script in 1922 followed by a Latin version in 1927 and under Stalin in 1945 a Cyrillic one too.

After the deportations of Caucasian Kurds began in 1937 Kurdish radio, the Riya Teze (newspaper) and other Kurdish institutions were closed. These radios were later revived in the 1950s.

With the outbreak of the Nagorno-Karabakh conflict in 1988, many Kurds fled Armenia. Around 18,000 Kurds left Armenia for Azerbaijan, a large community of Kurds from Armenia and neighboring countries has developed in Krasnodar. Between 1992 and 1994 the Kurdish minority of the Lachin and Kelbajar districts of Azerbaijan was forced to flee due to the Armenian invasion during the First Nagorno-Karabakh War.

==== Azerbaijan ====
In the independent Azerbaijan Democratic Republic, from 1918 to 1920, Kurds held offices in government, most notably Khosrov bey Sultanov and Nurmammad bey Shahsuvarov.

In 1923, the Central Executive Committee of the Azerbaijan SSR created the administrative unit Kurdistan Uezd, 73% of its population was Kurdish and 26% was Azeri.

In 1937, the leader of the Soviet Union, Joseph Stalin, did not trust the Kurdish population and ordered their forced deportation to the Kazakh SSR, Uzbek SSR, and Kirghiz SSR. This group of Kurds came from Nakhchivan Autonomous SSR (part of the Azerbaijan SSR). Most of them died during the deportation.

When in 1961 the First Iraqi–Kurdish War started, there were efforts by the Kurdish deportees of the 30s and 40s for the restoration of their rights, but these proved to be futile.

In 1989, the Yekbûn was founded, which aimed to reestablish Kurdish autonomy in the Soviet Union. The Soviet government under Mikhail Gorbachev attempted to help the Kurds, but this failed because as the collapse of the Soviet Union occurred in 1991 and Turkish animosity to the plan.

After the fall of the Soviet Union, the new republics of Armenia and Azerbaijan went to war in the First Nagorno-Karabakh War which led to the creation of the Kurdish Republic of Lachin in 1992. It was backed by Armenia, and when their support stopped due to political change, the republic was dissolved.

==== Russia ====
During World War II, one of the most renowned Soviet Kurds was the Yazidi named Samand Siabandov, who was awarded the title Hero of the Soviet Union during the war against Nazi Germany. He was born in 1909 in Kars oblast, which was in the Caucasus Viceroyalty and part of the Russian Empire.

In 1998, the leader of the PKK Abdullah Öcalan sought political asylum in Russia. In November 1998, the State Duma sent President Boris Yeltsin a recommendation to grant Öcalan political asylum in Russia, but to no avail. This was due to Russia and Turkey having developed a friendly economic and political relationship and Russia did not want to endanger this new friendship.

==== Georgia ====
The number of Kurds in Georgia fluctuated throughout the 20th century, between 1944 and 1948 under the Soviet Union parts of the kurdish population were deported to Central Asia. Between 1979 and 1989 the Kurdish population increased by 30%, but since independence in 1991 the number has steadily decreased.

== Historical Kurdish States in Caucasia ==
=== Shaddadid Dynasties (951–1199) ===
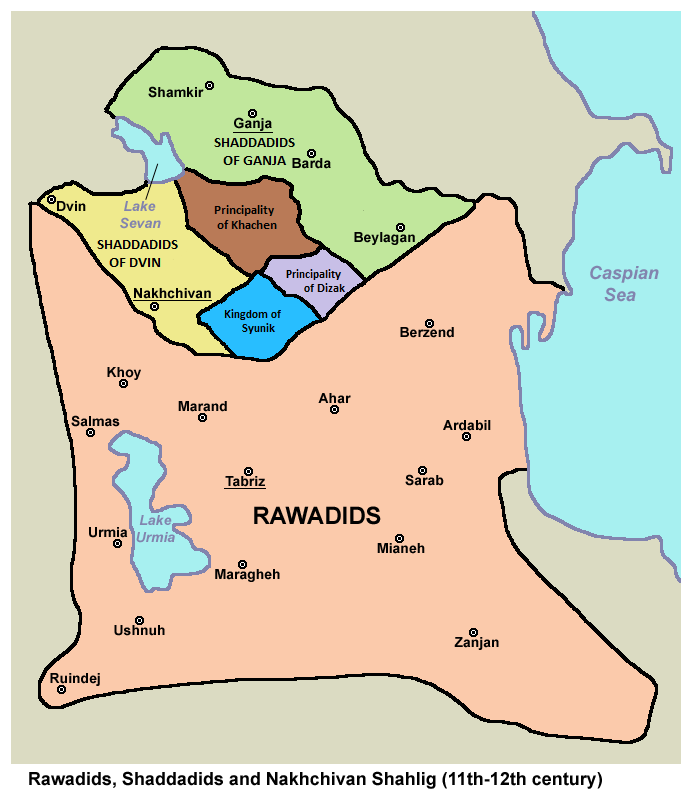
Map of the Shaddadid Dynasties (11th–12th Century)

The History of Kurds in the Caucasus goes back to the 10th century, specifically in 951 when the Shaddadid Dynasty was established at Dvin by Muhammad ibn Shaddad (Arabic: محمد بن شداد; Kurdish: محمد کوڕی شەداد). The Shaddadid Dynasty reached its greatest extent in 1030, during which it included territories from modern-day Armenia and Azerbaijan. In 1067 the Shaddadids became a vassal state of the Seljuk Empire after the death of Abu'l-Aswar. The Shaddadid State (of Dvin & Ganja) was fully annexed in 1075 by the Seljuk Sultan Alp Arslan and the dynasty survived in Ani through Manuchihr ibn Shavur. The Shaddadid Dynasty of Ani was independent for almost another 100 years until in 1161, when the Georgian King George III annexed all of Ani. The Shaddadids would rule over Ani again after a coalition of muslim states defeated Georgia in 1163, though they were a vassal of Azerbaijan. In 1174, Ani would again be occupied by Georgia and after switching sides between Georgia and the Shaddadids for another 4 times, the Shaddadid family lost all power over Ani in 1199.

=== Kurdistan Uezd (1923-1929) ===
Kurdistan Uezd (also known as "Red Kurdistan") was a Soviet administrative unit which existed as an autonomous region inside the Azerbaijan SSR for 6 years. Its capital was Lachin and the region was majority Kurdish. In 1929, the Azerbaijani Congress of Soviets dissolved the autonomous region.

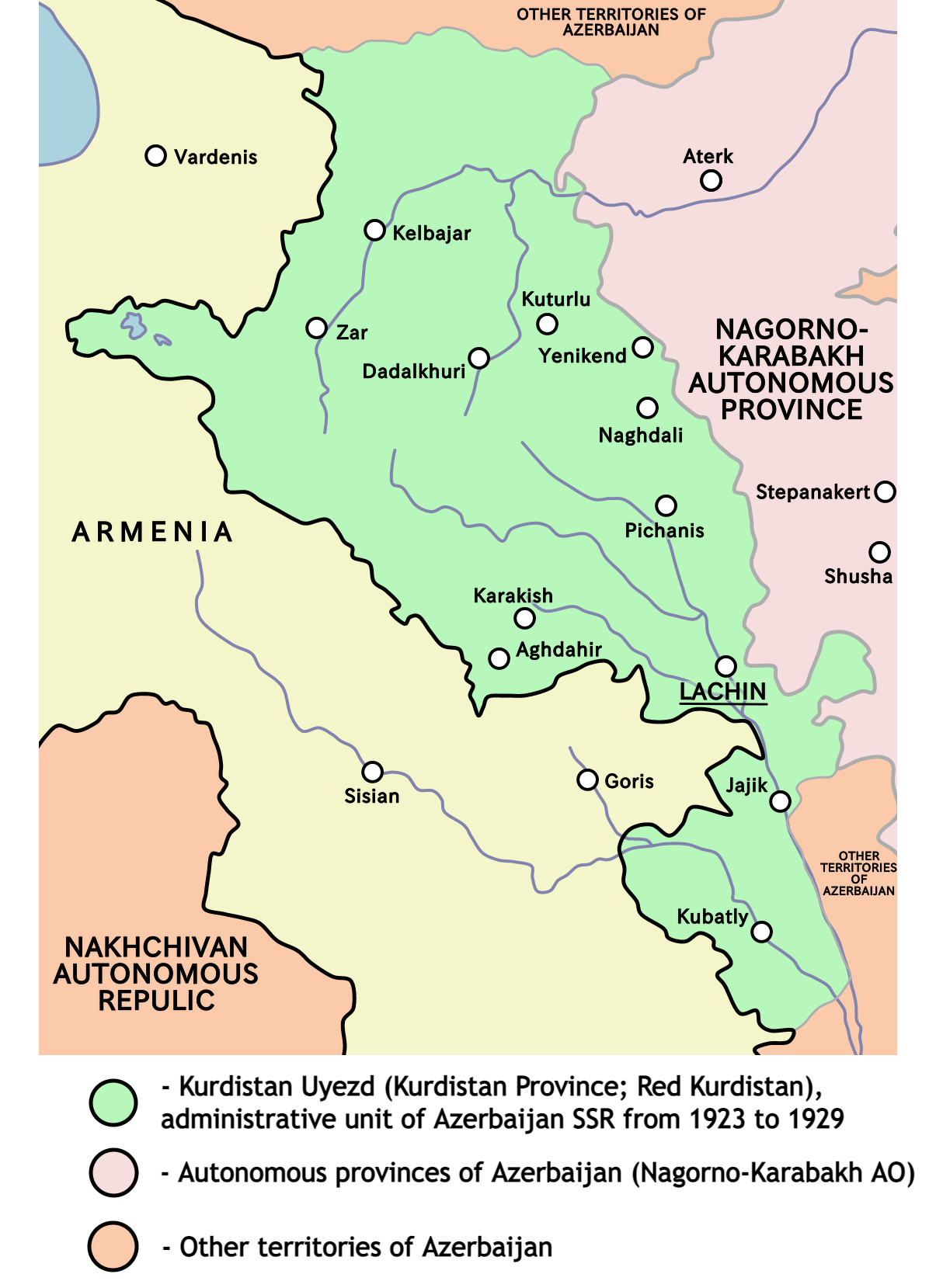
Map of Kurdistan Uezd (1923-1929) and Kurdistan Okrug (1930)

=== Kurdistan Okrug (1930) ===
The administrative unit of Kurdistan Okrug only existed for around 2 months before being dissolved, which was due to it straining relations between the Soviet Union, Iran and Turkey.

=== Kurdish Lachin (1992) ===
Kurdish Lachin (Officially: English: The Kurdish Republic of Lachin; Kurdish (Kurmanji): Komara kurdî ya Laçînê) was a unofficial Republic which existed for one year during the First Nagorno-Karabakh War, its Territory was the same as that of Kurdistan Uezd and the following Kurdistan Okrug. It was backed by Armenia, and when their support stopped due to political change in late 1992 the Republic was dissolved.

== Persecution ==
=== Deportation of 1937 ===
The First Deportation of Kurds from Caucasus occurred in 1937, then leader of the Soviet Union, Joseph Stalin did not trust the Kurdish population and ordered their forced Deportation to Kazakh SSR, Uzbek SSR and Kirghiz SSR. This group of Kurds from the first Deportation by Stalin came from Nakhchivan Autonomous SSR (Part of Azerbaijan SSR). Most of them died during the deportation.

=== Deportation of 1938 ===
In 1938, Azeris, Persians, Kurds, and Assyrians were deported from the Azerbaijan SSR to the Kazakh SSR.

=== Deportation of March 1944 ===
Cleansing of Tbilisi, where Azeris and Kurds had been deported from Tbilisi to Southern Georgia SSR.

=== Deportation of November 1944 ===
In November 1944, multiple ethnicities from Southwestern Georgia SSR were deported to Central Asia, among them Caucasian Kurds.

=== Deportation of 1948 ===
In August 1948, the last deportation of Caucasian Kurds was carried out. Kurds belonging to the force of Mustafa Barzani from the Azerbaijan SSR were deported for their affiliation with Barzani.

== In Kazakhstan ==
=== History ===
The Kurdish population in Kazakhstan has descended from Caucasian Kurds from Azerbaijan and Georgia, who have been deported to Central Asia in 1937, 1938 and 1944 by Joseph Stalin. Some of those Kurds that were deported to Uzbekistan and Kyrgyzstan later migrated north to Kazakhstan due to the Osh Riots in 1990.

=== Population ===
The population of Kurds in Kazakhstan has steadily increased since 1970. There wasn't any census for Kurds in Kazakhstan prior to 1970, but there was a 1959 census for all for Central Asia that counted 14,000 Kurds.

Number of Kurds in Kazakhstan
Year	Number	Source
1970	12,313	
1979	17,692	
1989	25,371	
1999	32,764	
2009	38,325	
2019	46,348	
2023	49,355	

=== Religion ===
Most Kurds in Kazakhstan are Muslim, with them accounting for 98.3% of the Kurdish population, while Christian Kurds account for 0.52% of the Kurdish population.

=== Language ===
88.7% of Kurds in Kazakhstan speak the Kurmanji dialect of Kurdish as their mother tongue. Places in Kazakhstan in which Kurds are a substantial part of the population often teach Kurdish literature and the Kurdish Language in primary and secondary schools. Since 1990, there has also been a Kurdish newspaper in Kazakhstan named "Kurdistan".

== Kurds from the Caucasus ==
- Nizami Ganjavi, 12th-century Muslim poet (born Ganja, 1149)
- Shirkuh, uncle of Saladin and mercenary commander (died 1169)
- Najm ad-Din Ayyub, father of Saladin (died 1173)
- Saladin, founder of the Ayyubid dynasty (died 1193)
- Shahanshah ibn Mahmud, emir of Ani from 1164 to 1174
- Shahbaz Khan Donboli, first khan of the Khoy Khanate from 1747 to 1763
- Ahmad Khan Donboli, second khan of the Khoy Khanate from 1763 to 1786
- Hosayn Qoli Donboli, third khan of the Khoy Khanate from 1786 to 1798.
- Jafar Qoli Khan Donboli, last khan of the Khoy Khanate from 1798 to 1799 and penultimate Khan of Shaki from 1806 to 1814.
- Jangir Agha, prominent military and social figure of Armenia in the early 20th century (born 1874, Van Vilayet)
- Fatali Khan Khoyski, Azerbaijani attorney, a member of the Second State Duma of the Russian Empire, Minister of Internal Affairs, Minister of Defense and, later the first Prime Minister of the independent Azerbaijan Democratic Republic. (born Shaki, 1875)
- Adil Khan Ziyadkhanov, Azerbaijani statesman and diplomat (born Ganja, 1877)
- Khosrov bey Sultanov, Azerbaijani-Kurdish statesman (born Kürdhacı, 1879)
- Gamar Sheyda, poet and playwright (born Shusha, 1881)
- Rustam Khan Khoyski, Azerbaijani statesman who served as the Minister of Social Security of Azerbaijan Democratic Republic and was member of Azerbaijani National Council. (born Ganja, 1888)
- Usuv Beg, member of the parliament of the First Republic of Armenia, major political, national, and military leader (died 1934)
- Nurmammad bey Shahsuvarov, Azerbaijani-Kurdish statesman (born Minkend, 1883)
- Arab Shamilov, Yazidi novelist (born Kars oblast, 1897)
- Emînê Evdal, writer, linguist and poet (born Kars, 1906)
- Nado Makhmudov, writer and public figure of the Soviet Union (born Martuni, 1907)
- Heciyê Cindî, Yazidi writer (born near Kars, 1908)
- Qanate Kurdo, philologist (born Kars oblast, 1909)
- Samand Siabandov, Yazidi Soviet war hero (born Kars oblast, 1909)
- Mamed Iskenderov, chairman of the Presidium of the Azerbaijan Supreme Soviet (born Eyvazly, 1915)
- Xelîlê Çaçan Mûradov, writer and journalist (born 1924)
- Ordîxanê Celîl, Kurdish scholar (born 1932, Yerevan)
- Shamil Asgarov, scholar, poet, and researcher (born Kalbajar, 1932)
- Bulbul, musical artist (1897, Stepanakert)
- Nadir Nadirov, scientist (born Nakhichevan, 1932)
- Aziz Tamoyan, Yazidi politician (born Zovuni, 1933)
- Emerîkê Serdar, Kurdish-Yazidi writer (born Sipan, 1935)
- Jalile Jalil, historian, writer and Kurdologist (born 1936, Yerevan)
- Eskerê Boyîk, Yazidi poet and writer (born 1941)
- Tosinê Reşîd, contemporary Yazidi writer, poet and playwright (born 1941)
- Polad Bülbüloğlu, soviet-azerbaijani singer (1945, Baku)
- Kamil Nasibov, soldier (born Bozlu, 1946)
- Têmûrê Xelîl, journalist, writer and translator (born 1949)
- Vazir Orujov, soldier (born Xoruzlu, 1956)
- Guram Zakharovich Adzhoyev, footballer (born Tbilisi, 1961)
- Firudin Shamoyev, soldier (born Qazax, 1962)
- Amar Suloev, martial arts fighter (born Tashir, 1976)
- Khanna Omarkhali, academic (born 1981)
- Roman Amoyan, wrestler (born Yerevan, 1983)
- Zara, pop singer, actress, and social activist (born Leningrad, 1983)
- Kyaram Sloyan, a Artsakh Defense Army soldier (born Artashavan, 1996)

== See also ==
- Religion in Kurdistan
