= Kurds in Armenia =

Ethnic group

Kurdên Ermenistanê Кӧрден Әрмәньстане

Total population
- 1,663 (2022 census)

Languages
- Kurdish (Kurmanji), Armenian, Russian

Religion
- Yazidism, Islam, Christianity

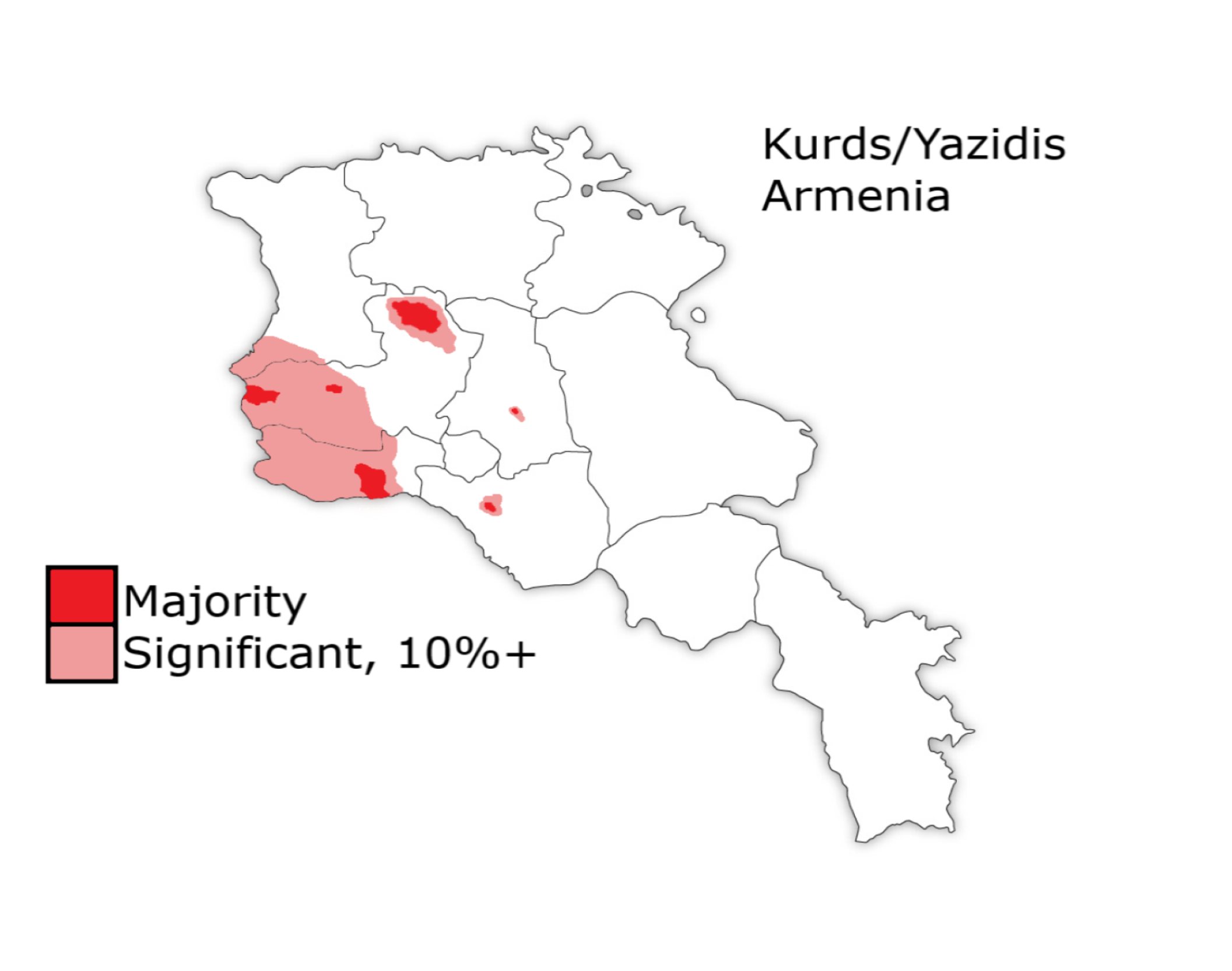
Armenia's Kurdish population

The Kurds in Armenia (Armenian: Քրդերը Հայաստանում, romanized: K’rderë Hayastanum; Kurdish: Kurdên Ermenistanê Кӧрден Әрмәньстане) are a Kurdish population who live mainly in the western parts of Armenia.

Kurds and Yazidis are counted as separate ethnic groups in Armenia (on the relationship between Yazidis and Kurdish identity, see Identity of Yazidis). The latest census conducted in Armenia (2022) recorded 31,079 Yazidi and 1,663 Kurdish inhabitants of Armenia based on the self-identification of the respondents. Practically all of those who identified themselves as Kurds in the census are members of the Yazidi community who embrace a Kurdish identity; extremely few Muslim Kurds live in Armenia today.

Since 2015, four seats in Armenia's parliament are guaranteed for representatives of the country's ethnic minorities, of which one seat is reserved for a representative of the Yazidi community and one seat for the Kurdish community.

== Kurds in Armenia ==
The Kurdish Shaddadid dynasty, which ruled over parts of modern-day Armenia from the 10th to 12th centuries, is the first real evidence of Kurdish presence in the region, which was likely small in medieval times. Kurdish tribes began to migrate from the south to the territory of modern-day Armenia, particularly onto the Ararat Plain, in the 18th century. Some Muslim Kurds settled in Eastern Armenia in the early 19th century, but most of them had resettled in the territory of modern-day Azerbaijan by the turn of the century. In the second half of the 19th century and the early 20th century, Yazidis settled in the Russian-controlled South Caucasus, fleeing religious persecution in the Ottoman Empire.

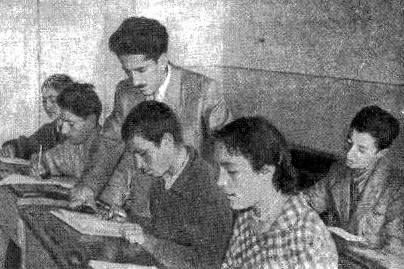
Kurdish students in Soviet Armenia

In the First Republic of Armenia of 1918–1920, the Kurds received political rights: a Kurdish representative was elected to the Armenian parliament and some Kurds became officers of the Armenian Army and organized Kurdish volunteer units. Conversely, some Kurds, particularly in the former Kars Oblast, did not accept Armenian rule and joined in revolts by the Turkic-speaking population of Armenia.

After Armenia became a Soviet republic, the Soviet government provided the Kurds of Armenia with access to media such as radio, education and press in their native tongue (Kurmanji) in line with the policy of korenizatsiya. A Kurdish alphabet using Armenian letters was created in 1922, followed by a Latin-based alphabet in 1927, then Cyrillic in 1945 (both Cyrillic and Latin are used now). In 1925 more than fifty schools were opened for the Kurds of Armenia. The Kurdish newspaper Riya Teze (The New Path) was established in Armenia in 1930, and a Kurdish radio broadcast began operating in Yerevan in the 1930s. Soviet Armenia was the main center of Kurdish literature and the second center of Kurdish studies in the Soviet Union after Leningrad. The first Kurdish novel, The Kurdish Shepherd (Şivanê Kurmanca) by Arab Shamilov, was published in Yerevan in 1935. There was a Kurdish Cabinet in the Institute of Oriental Studies of the Armenian National Academy of Sciences.

The 1926 Armenian silent film Zare, which tells the story of two Yazidi lovers intertwined with social issues, is often considered the first film about Kurds (sound was added to the film in the 1970s). Another film about Yazidis titled Krder-Yezdiner, directed by Amasi Martirosyan, was released in 1932.

In 1937, during the period of Stalinism, many Kurds in Armenia and neighboring Azerbaijan were forcibly deported to Kazakhstan, other Central Asian republics and Siberia. Kurdish-language radio in Armenia, the newspaper Riya Teze and other Kurdish institutions were closed down in 1937, although they were revived in the 1950s.

With the outbreak of the Nagorno-Karabakh conflict in the late 1980s, many Muslim Kurds fled Armenia together with Azerbaijanis, with whom they were connected by cultural, religious and often marital ties. Up to 18,000 Kurds left Armenia for Azerbaijan (some of which then emigrated to Russia) or Russia in this period. A particularly large community of Kurds from Armenia and neighboring countries (both Muslims and Yazidis) developed in Krasnodar. In 1992–1994 the Kurdish minority of the Lachin and Kelbajar districts of Azerbaijan was forced to flee due to the Armenian invasion during the First Nagorno-Karabakh War.

According to Shakro Mgoyan, the director of the Center of Kurdish Research, the situation with Kurds in Armenia today is normal and there is not any open intolerance. The Election Code of Armenia reserves one seat in the parliament to a representative of the Kurdish minority and one for a representative of the Yazidi minority.

Currently, the Kurds and Yazidis (recognized as separate ethnicities in Armenia) are represented in 4 general assemblies of Armenia: the Kurdish Intellectuals Council, the Kurdistan Committee, the Armenian-Kurdish Friendship Council and the National Union of Yazidis. In addition, there is a section of Kurdish writers in the Writers' Union of Armenia.

For most of the Soviet period, Yazidis and Kurds in Armenia were not treated as distinct groups and were both counted as Kurds. According to one scholar, Yazidi intellectuals played a major role in the development of Kurdish studies and literature in Soviet Armenia, as well as the creation of a secular Kurdish national identity. Starting in the late 1980s, some of the Yazidi community's religious and political leaders, such as Aziz Tamoyan and Hasan Tamoyan, began efforts to assert a separate Yazidi ethnic identity and demand acknowledgment as such from the government. Their followers reject any connection with Kurds and refer to the dialect of Kurmanji spoken by Yazidis as Ezdiki. (Note: Armenian census data likewise refers to a "Yazidi language" (yezdieren in Armenian) separately from the "Kurdish language" (krderen).) Many Yazidis understand "Kurd" to mean exclusively Muslim Kurds and may view being referred to as Kurds as offensive.

However, some Yazidis in Armenia acknowledge their ties with Kurds and a minority identify themselves as Kurds (particularly those that have received a higher education). Most of those in Armenia who self-identify as Kurds in censuses are from the Yazidi community, and very few Muslim Kurds remain in the country (Hranush Kharatyan estimated their number at two dozen as of 2011).

== Political representation ==
Knyaz Hasanov is the leader of the Kurdish community of Armenia and represents the community in the National Assembly of Armenia as a member of the ruling Civil Contract Party's parliamentary bloc. After the parliamentary elections in 2021, Hasanov presided over the first session of the Armenian Parliament.

== Demographics ==
Kurdish and Yazidi population in Armenia (2001–2014)
Province	2001		2011	
Province	Number	%	Number	%
Armenia	42,139	1.3%	37,470	1.2%
Armavir	17,793	6.4%	17,063	6.4%
Aragatsotn	7,251	5.2%	7,090	5.3%
Ararat	5,972	2.2%	5,001	1.9%
Yerevan	4,825	0.4%	3,361	0.3%
Kotayk	4,326	1.6%	3,305	1.3%
Shirak	981	0.3%	763	0.3%
Lori	802	0.3%	663	0.3%
Gegharkunik	124	0.1%	114	0%
Tavush	60	0%	44	0%
Syunik	4	0%	26	0%
Vayots Dzor	1	0%	10	0%

== Kurdish-Armenian cultural relations ==
The influential 19th-century Armenian writer Khachatur Abovian pioneered Kurdish studies in the Russian Empire. Prominent Armenian composer Komitas collected many Armenian, Kurdish, and Turkish folk songs. Armenian poet Hovhannes Shiraz used the motives of Kurdish legend in his famous poem "Siamanto and Khjezare".

== Prominent Kurds/Yazidis of Armenia ==
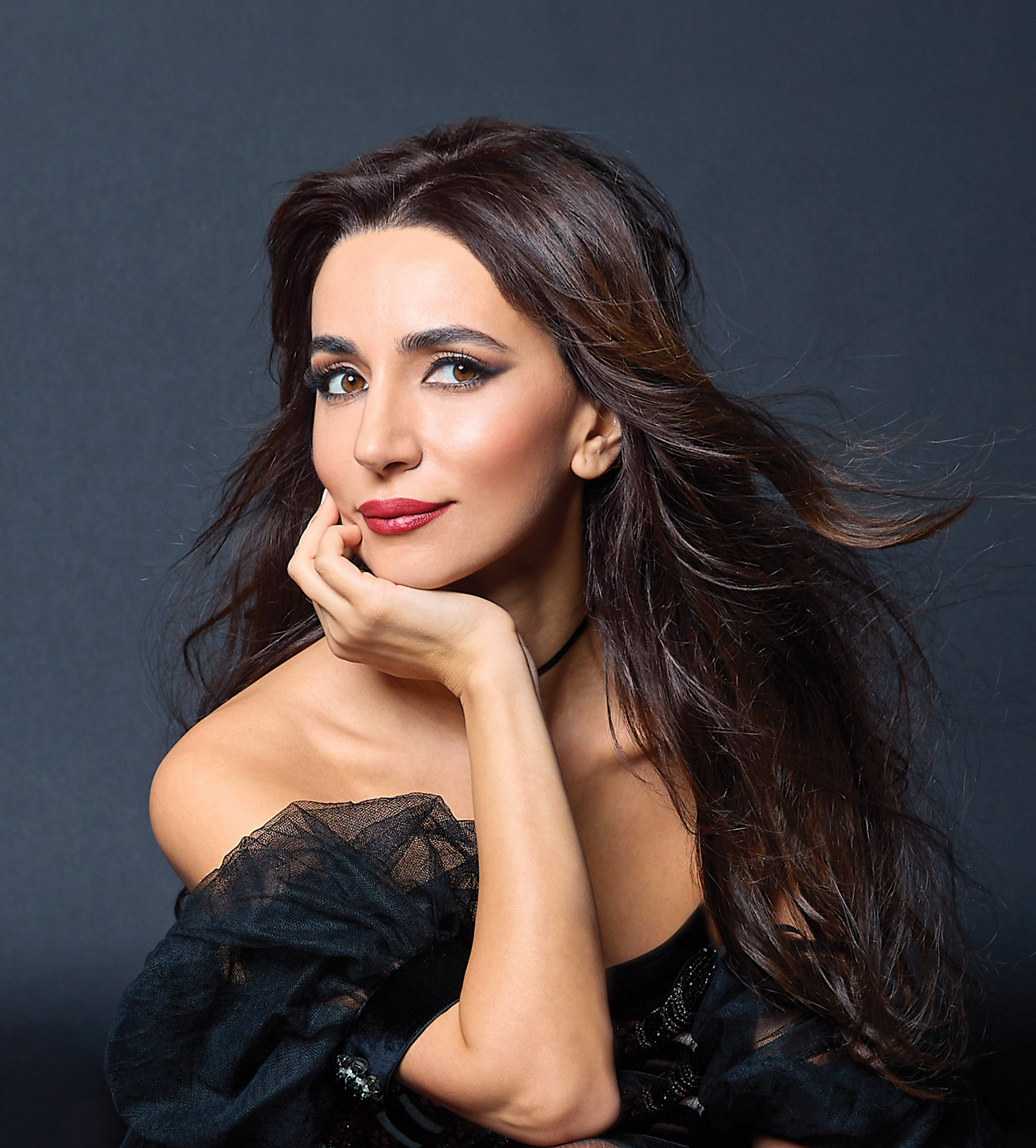
Zara

- Najm ad-Din Ayyub and his brother, Shirkuh, who were born near the ancient city of Dvin (near the present-day village of the same name). Ayyub's son Saladin would establish a dynasty under his father's name and led the Islamic opposition to the Franks and other European Crusaders in the Levant.
- Aziz Tamoyan, Yazidi politician
- Amar Suloev, American mixed martial arts fighter of Yazidi origin
- Aziz Shavershian, Russian-born Australian bodybuilder and internet celebrity
- Roman Amoyan, Armenian wrestler of Yazidi origin
- Zara Mgoyan, Russian singer of Yazidi origin
- Emerîkê Serdar, Armenian Kurdish-Yazidi writer (1935–2018)
- Emînê Evdal, Kurdish writer, linguist and poet based in Armenia
- Nado Makhmudov, Kurdish writer and public figure of the Soviet Union
- Arab Shamilov, Soviet Yazidi Kurdish novelist
- Eskerê Boyîk, Yazidi Kurdish poet and writer
- Heciyê Cindî, Soviet Yazidi Kurdish writer and literary scholar.
- Têmûrê Xelîl, journalist, writer and translator
- Tosinê Reşîd, contemporary Kurdish Yazidi writer, poet and playwright
- Xelîlê Çaçan Mûradov, writer and journalist
- Jalile Jalil, historian, writer and Kurdologist
- Jangir Agha, prominent military and social figure of Armenia in the early 20th century
- Ordîxanê Celîl, Kurdish scholar
- Khanna Omarkhali, an academic born in Armenia but now residing in Germany
- Kyaram Sloyan, a Artsakh Defense Army soldier of Yazidi origin who was killed during the 2016 Armenian–Azerbaijani clashes.
- Usuv Beg, member of the parliament of the First Republic of Armenia, a major political, national, and a military leader

== See also ==
- Armenian–Kurdish relations
- Armenian genocide
- Hamidiye (cavalry)
- Qulp (Kurdish Emirate)
- Yazidis in Armenia
- Place name changes in Armenia
