= Yezidis in Armenia =

Ethnic group in Armenia

Yazidis in Armenia
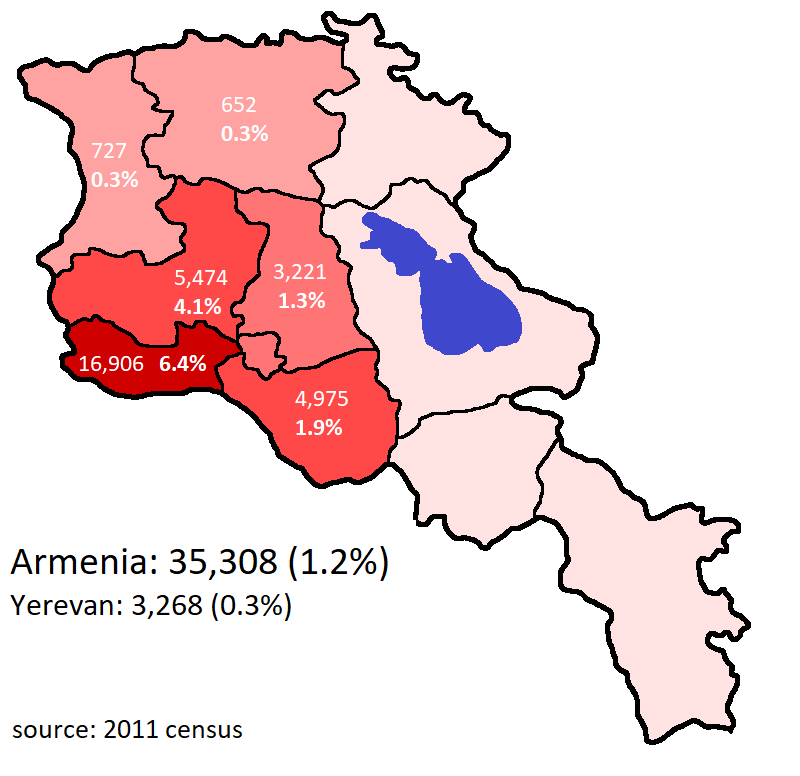
- Map of Yazidis in Armenia by province

Total population
- 31,079 (2022, census)

Regions with significant populations
- Armavir, Aragatsotn, Ararat, Kotayk provinces and Yerevan

Languages
- Kurmanji, Armenian

Religion
- Yazidism

Yazidis form the largest ethnic minority in Armenia. Yazidis settled in the territory of modern-day Armenia mainly in the 19th and early 20th centuries, fleeing religious persecution by the Ottoman Empire. While Yazidis were counted as Kurds in censuses for much of the Soviet period, they are currently recognized as a separate ethnic group in Armenia (for more on the relationship between Yazidis and Kurdish identity, see Yazidis). According to the 2022 census, around 31,079 Yazidis live in Armenia.

The Election Code of Armenia guarantees one seat in the National Assembly for a representative of the Yazidi community. Several religious Yazidi temples exist in Armenia, including the world's largest Yazidi temple Quba Mere Diwane in Aknalich, which was opened in 2020. In 2021, a Yazidi national theater was opened in Vagharshapat.

Flag of the Yezidi National Union in Armenia

== History ==
=== Early 20th century ===
Many Yazidis came to the Russian Empire (now the territory of Armenia and Georgia) under their leader Temur Agha during the 19th and his grandson Usuv Beg in late 19th and early 20th centuries to escape religious persecution, as they were oppressed by the Ottoman Turks and the Sunni Kurds who tried to convert them to Islam. The Yazidis were massacred alongside the Armenians during the Armenian genocide, causing many to flee to Russian-held parts of Armenia. In a letter from Usuv Beg to the Russian tsar, Usuv Beg expressed gratitude to the Romanovs for sheltering Yazidis, who had fled from the Ottoman Empire 60 years previously, under the leadership of his grandfather, Temur Agha. In addition, he writes that his people are Yazidi Kurds. He indicates his nationality as Kurdish, but specifies that they are Yazidi by religion:

I am happy on behalf of 3,000 Families of Yezidi-Kurds, who 60 years ago, led by my Grandfather Temur Agha, left Turkey and sought refuge in Russia[.] I would like to express my gratitude and wish success to you and your family[.] We live very well on earth and under your rule.

The first Yazidi school in Armenia was opened in 1920.

=== Nagorno-Karabakh War ===
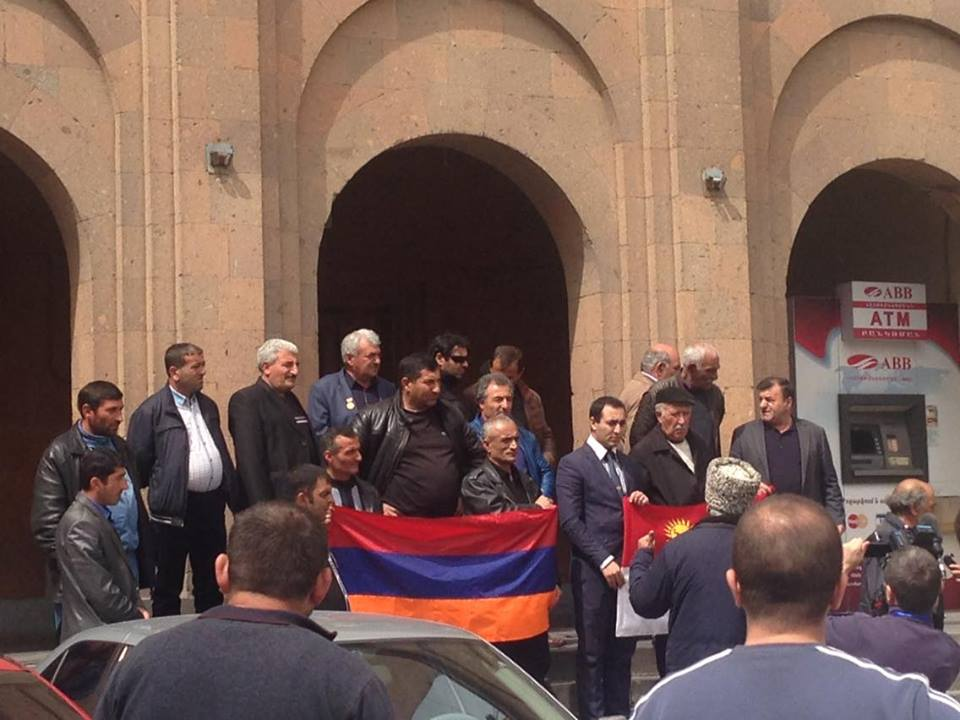
Yazidis in Yerevan condemning Azerbaijan's actions against Artsakh during the 2016 Nagorno-Karabakh conflict.

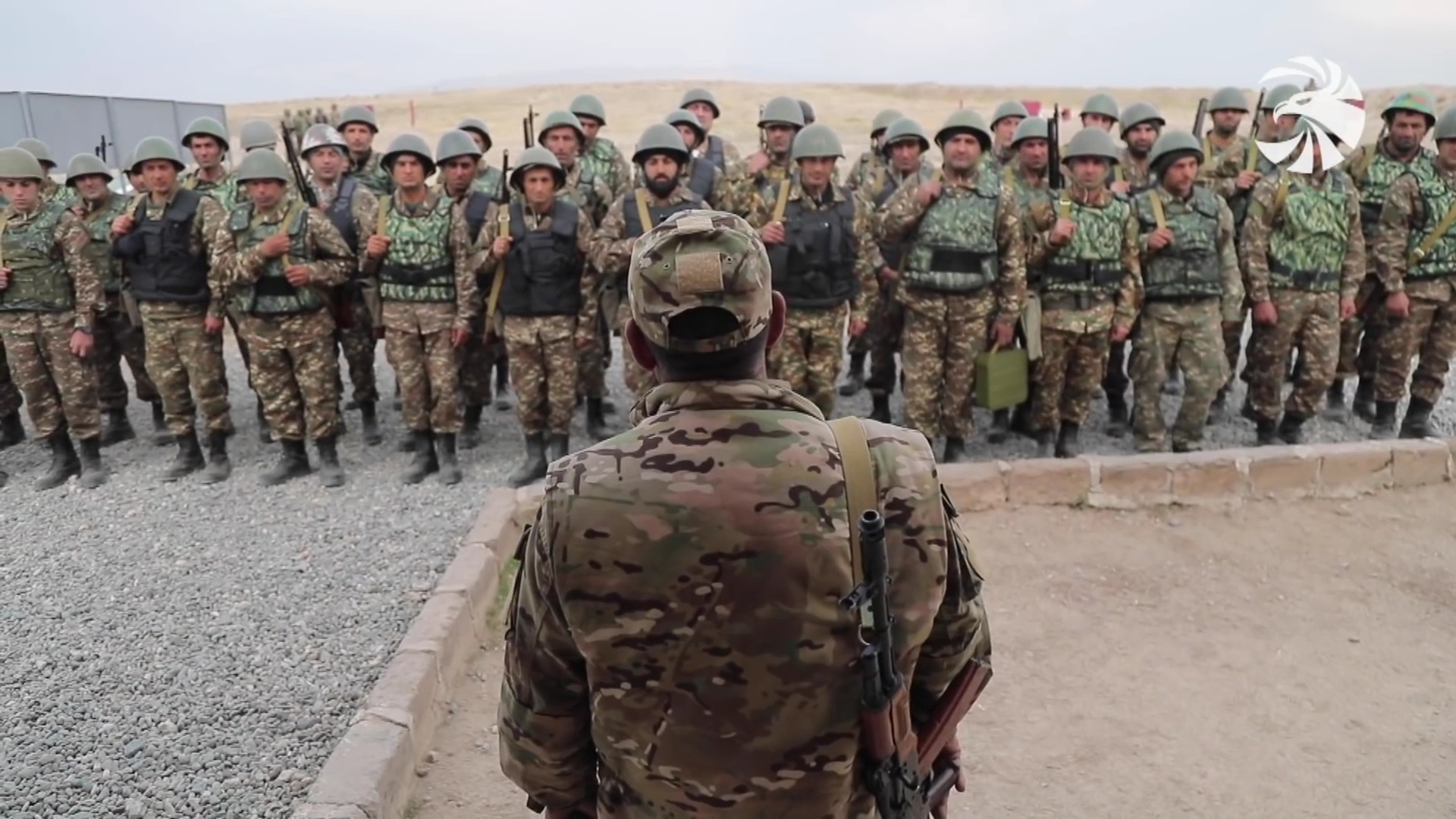
A detachment of volunteering Yazidis in Armenia for the Second Nagorno-Karabakh War in 2020.

In 1988, the 3rd All-Armenian Yazidi Assembly, (convened on 30 September 1989 - the two previous assemblies occurred at the dawn of the Armenian SSR's history, in 1921 and 1923) asked for official recognition of their identity by the government. As a result, Yazidis were presented as a separate minority in the USSR population census of 1989. According to this census, the total count of Yazidis in Armenia was 52,700.

Many Yazidis volunteered during the First Nagorno-Karabakh War to fight on the Armenian side. In particular, a volunteer detachment of 500 Yazidis named after Jangir Agha was commanded by Aziz Tamoyan․

In 2020, after the break out of the Second Nagorno-Karabakh war, many Yazidis in Armenia again volunteered to defend Artsakh.

== Soviet intellectualism ==
Yazidi intellectuals played a crucial role in fostering a secularized idea of Kurdish nationalism that would bridge across the religious divide which had historically separated Yazidi communities from their fellow Kurdish-speaking Muslims. These vanguards of Soviet Kurdish culture consisted of Yazidis such as the linguist Arab Shamilov who published the first novel in Kurmancî by the title of Şivanê Kurmanca. It also included many other famous intellectuals such as Qanatê Kurdo, Casimê Celîl, Emînê Evdal, Ferîkê Ûsiv, Celîlê Celîl, Ordîxanê Celîl, Hecîyê Cindî and the poet Shikoye Hasan. The years 1932-1938 are considered the golden period for the development of Kurdish culture in Soviet Armenia. In 1934, a conference was held in Yerevan between the Kurdish writers about writing in Kurdish where topics such as the creation of Kurdish neologisms for new technical devices and concepts were discussed.

=== Literature ===
In 1922, a Kurdish alphabet based on the Armenian script was created in Yerevan. Five years later, the first Kurdish alphabet based on the Latin script was created in 1927 by the Yazidi Kurdish intellectual Arab Shamilov and the Assyrian intellectual Îshak Margulov. Another Kurdish alphabet based on the Cyrillic script was created in 1945.

From 1929 onwards, the number of printed books in the Kurdish language increased rapidly in Armenia, and in 1932, a branch of the within Writers' Union of the Armenian SSR was founded for Kurdish authors who were strongly influenced by Armenian and Russian literature.

The Kurdish-Yazidi intellectuals Emînê Avdal, Heciyê Cindî and Casimê Celîl published their works in the famous Kurdish newspaper Riya Teze (The New Way), which began its publication in Yerevan in 1930.

The first theatre play Qitiya du dermana (The Medicine Box, 1932) was written by Heciyê Cindî, who dedicated his life to collecting material related to Kurdish folklore and publishing them. Wezirê Nadir wrote a second play, titled Reva Jin (The Abduction) in 1935. A few years later, Wezîrê also wrote a long poem titled Nado û Gulizer, which narrated a heroic story about a young Kurd and his fiancée during the war.

The most famous Kurdish novelist of this period was Arab Shamilov, who in 1929 published Şivanê Kurmanca (The Kurdish/Kurmanji Shepherd), which is considered to be the first novel in Kurmancî. In this novel, Shamilov writes about his early life living as a shepherd and describes how he joined the Communist movement and participated in the Russian Revolution of 1917.

=== Cinema, Theatre and Radio ===
The first Kurdish film was titled Zare (Zerê) and was produced in Soviet Armenia by Arme-Kino in 1926. It was a silent and black-and-white movie which was 72-minutes long and was directed by Hamo Beknazarian (sound was added in the 1970s). This film is about 1915 love story between a Yazidi couple, the young and beautiful Zare, and the shepherd Saydo. In line with the communist ideology which dominated in the 1920s, the film shows how the administration of the tsar takes advantage of the ignorance of Kurds to exploit them with the help of spiritual and tribal leaders.

In 1933, another film about Yazidi Kurds was produced in Armenia. It was titled "Krder-ezidner" (Kurds-Yazidis) and was also a silent film, it was 52-minute long and recorded in black-and-white. The director was Amasi Martirosyan. The film documented and exhibited the establishment of a kolkhoz in an Armenian Yazidi village

In 1937, Armenian Yazidis created the first and only state-supported Kurdish theater in the world. The theater was founded in the village of Alagyaz as "Kurdish Folk Theatre of Alagyaz". The theatre group consisted of young Kurds from Alagyaz district and it was managed by two directors, the Armenian Tsolak Nikoghosyan and the Kurd, Celatê Koto. This Kurdish Theatre launched its first production in November 1937 with Samson Kajoyan's Xuliqandina Rojê (The Sun Rises), a play dedicated to the 20th anniversary of the 1917 October Revolution. The Kurdish Theatre was supported by numerous Armenian artists including the actor Mkrtich Djanan, director Amo Kharazyan and the playwrights including but not limited to Suren Ginosyan and Vardges Shogheryan. These theatre artists trained the young Kurdish actors who, within a few years, acquired a great reputation by participating in the national theatre festival and performing in other places such as in Georgia's capital city of Tbilisi.

During the ten years of its existence, the Kurdish Theatre of Alagyaz staged around thirty plays, some of which were written by famous Kurdish intellectuals such as Heciyê Cindî, Cerdoyê Genco and Celatê Koto. The theatre was also often supported by famous Kurdish intellectuals such as Emînê Evdal, Casimê Celîl, Usivê Beko, Semend Siyabendov and also the writer and editor-in-chief of the Kurdish newspaper Ria Taza, Mîroyê Esed.

During World War II, the theatre produced plays that displayed pro-Soviet propaganda and depicted the Soviet Kurds' loyalty for their country. However, there were also plays related to Kurdish folklore and tradition. Such as Keça Mîrakê (The Girl from Mirak), Ker û Kulik (Kar and Kulik; based on an old Kurdish epic), Xecêzerê û Siyabend (Khaj and Siyaband), Ewledê Çiyayê Reş (The Son of Black Mountain) and Mêrxasê Bajarê Cizîrê (The Hero of the City of Jazira), all of which were produced by Suren Ginosyan. However, in 1947, due to financial problems, the theatre had to close down together with many other theatres across the country.

In the 1930s, Radio Yerevan had begun to broadcast programmes in Kurdish, but stopped in 1937 due to the Great Purge under Joseph Stalin. However, the broadcasts in Kurdish began again under Khrushchev when Casimê Celîl took on the position of being the Head of Radio Yerevan's Kurdish department in 1954, shortly before it officially began broadcasting on 1 January 1955. The Kurdish programs on the radio were broadcast 3 times weekly, 15 minutes per day, however the topics were directly regulated by the Communist government, thus, the programs mainly focused on culture, broadcasting music and radio plays rather than Kurdish nationalism and politics. In 1961, the Kurdish programs started being broadcast for 1.5 hours every day; the broadcasts reached outside Armenia's borders to Iraq, Iran, Turkey, Syria as well as several other regions within Soviet Union. The number of listeners started growing and the Radio's staff were able to establish contacts with other Kurdish communities across the Middle East and Soviet Union.

After Armenia's independence and the fall of Soviet Union in 1991, Radio Yerevan was not financed anymore due to the social and economic challenges the country was facing. Almost the entire staff of the Kurdish department lost their jobs and had to immigrate abroad due to the rampant unemployment plaguing the country. Keremê Seyad, one of the staff who remained, took over the position as the head and started implementing reforms in the department and thanks to the ideological restrictions being lifted by the fall of Soviet Union, he was able to broadcast a wider range of topics related to Kurds including news and political commentary alongside Kurdish history, culture and language. On Mondays, the radio broadcast a program called "Cultural Diary" where people could listen to radio plays and call the department to request music. Tuesdays and Wednesdays focused on Kurdish heritage, broadcasting topics related to Kurdish language, literature and history through the programs "Your Native Language" and "The History of Kurds and Kurdistan" programs. Keremê Seyad also established a program called "Looking for Relatives", where he was able to help in reuniting many Kurdish families from Turkey and Armenia who had been separated in the early 20th century.

Radio Yerevan significantly helped in preserving and raising self-awareness among many Kurdish communities across the Middle East, Europe and the former Soviet territories. Especially for Kurds in Turkey, where there was systemic suppression against Kurdish language and culture by the state. Because of the radio, Kurds in Turkey were able to have an opportunity to hear the Kurdish language on the radio as well as listen to material related to Kurdish culture, especially music. Today, there are approximately over 10,000 recordings of Kurdish folk songs and theatrical plays in the archives of Yerevan Radio.

== Present situation ==
=== Demographics ===
According to the 2022 census, there are 31,079 Yazidis in Armenia. There were 35,272 Yazidis registered in the 2011 census, while there were 40,620 Yazidis registered in the 2001 census. Media have estimated the number of Yazidis in Armenia as between 30,000 and 50,000. Most of them are descendants of refugees to Armenia following the persecution during Ottoman rule, including during the Armenian genocide, when many Armenians found refuge in Yazidi villages. A minority of Yazidis in Armenia (around 3,600) converted to Christianity, but they are not accepted by the other Yazidis as Yazidis, and often are the result of mixed Armenian-Yazidi marriages, since the Yazidi religion does not accept outsiders. Yazidis in Armenia are recognized as an ethnic group, which according to a report has been perceived as an attempt to promote a non-Kurdish identity and has angered many in the community. Sympathy for the Kurdistan Workers' Party is also widespread.

==== Age structure ====
Ethnic Yazidis have a slightly younger population compared to ethnic Armenians. Almost 54 percent is under thirty years old, while 8 percent is aged sixty or older.

Population (urban, rural) by Ethnicity, Sex and Age as of 2011 census
Ethnic group	Total	0 – 9	10 – 19	20 – 29	30 – 39	40 – 49	50 – 59	60+
Yazidis	35,308	5,984	6,236	6,795	5,193	4,645	3,624	2,831
Share per age group (%)	100.0	16.9	17.7	19.2	14.7	13.2	10.3	8.0

=== Political rights ===
Election Code of Armenia guarantees one seat in the National Assembly to represent the country's Yazidi population. The seat is currently held by Rustam Bakoyan, a member of the ruling Civil Contract Party.

=== Culture ===
In January 2021, the national theater of Yazidis was opened in Vagharshapat, with the first play being about the fallen Yazidi soldiers of the 2020 Nagorno-Karabakh war.

==== Memorials and religious sites ====
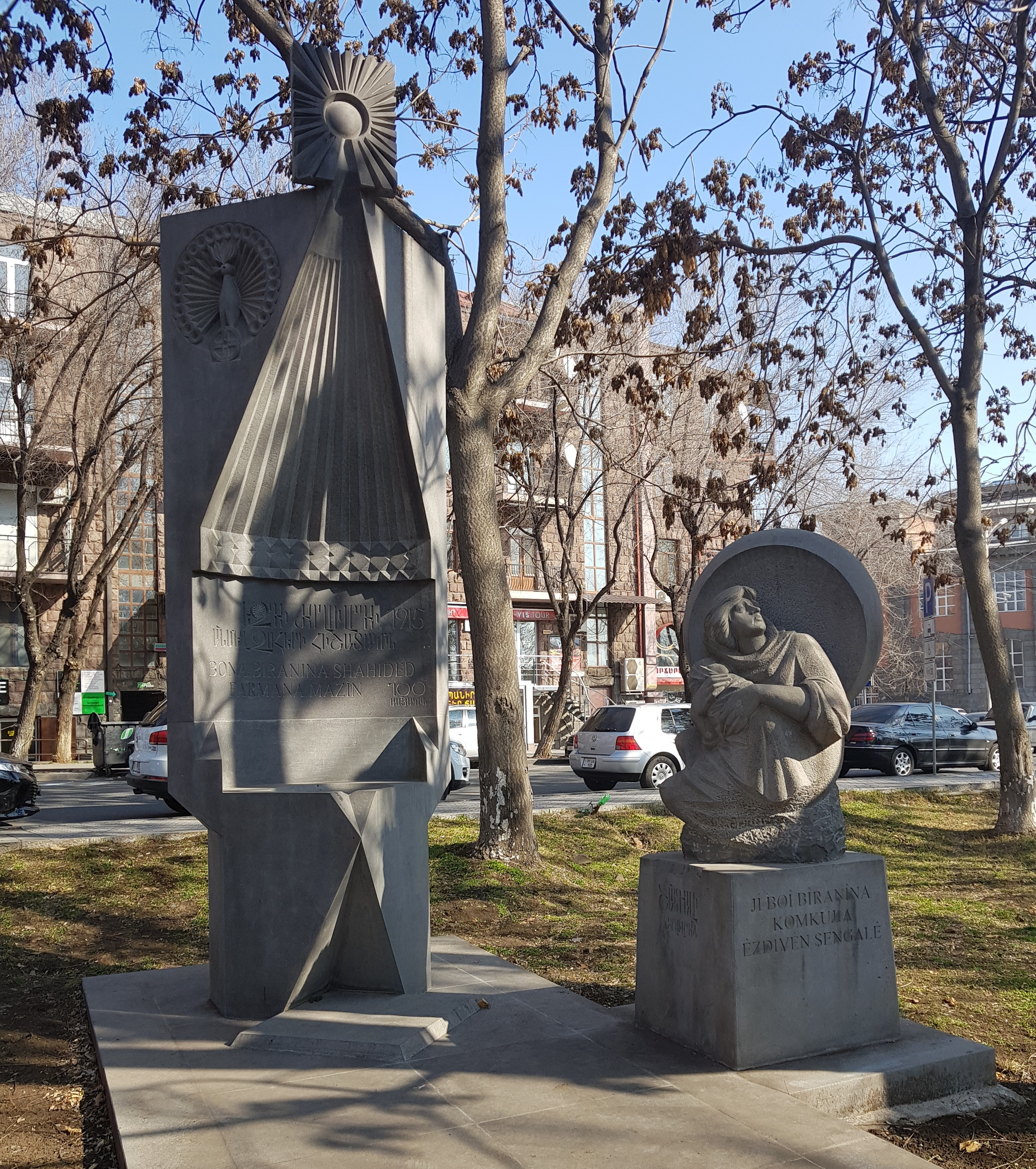
A memorial dedicated to fallen Yazidis in Yerevan.

In 2016 a memorial to fallen Yazidis was installed in downtown Yerevan downtown in a park at the intersection of Isahakyan and Nalbandyan streets.

The world's largest Yazidi temple, Quba Mere Diwane in Aknalich, was opened in 2020. Another temple named Quba Mere Diwane opened on 2 September 2019, and is dedicated to Melek Taus, one of seven angels in Yazidi theology.

=== Religion ===
The vast majority of Yazidis in Armenia are followers of the Yazidi religion, which they call Sharfadin. In recent years, some Yazidis have converted to proselytizing neo-Protestant Christian denominations, namely the Jehovah's Witnesses. According to one study from 2018, the Yazidi-populated village of Sadunts consists entirely of Yazidis who have become members of the Jehovah's Witnesses.

=== Foreign evaluations of Yazidi rights ===
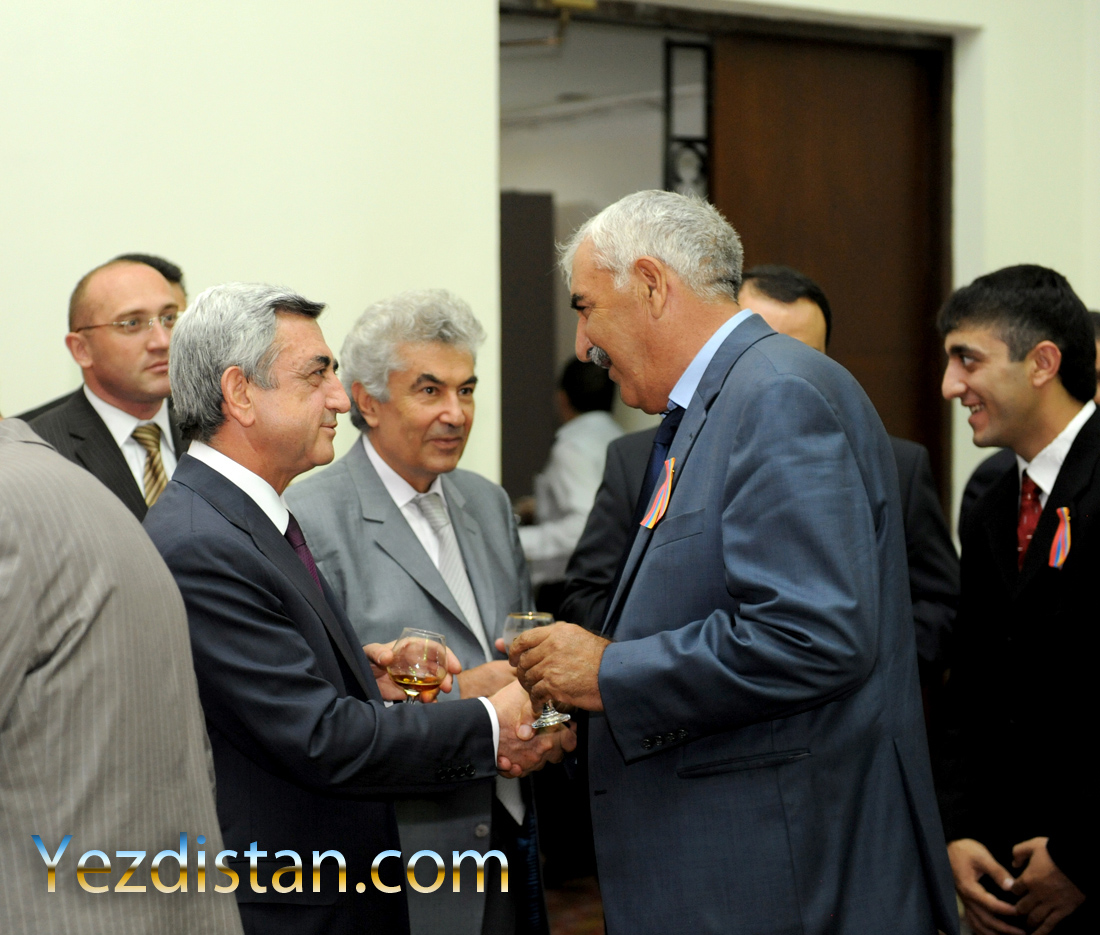
The president of the National Union of Yazidis, Aziz Tamoyan with Armenia's third president Serzh Sargsyan in 2011.

US reports on the relations between Yazidis and the Armenian government have been mixed. According to a 1998 United States Department of State report, Yazidis were subjected to some harassment in Armenia. Attendance school rates among children in the Yazidi ethnic minority continued to be lower than average, partially due to economic reasons, a lack of Yazidi teachers and books, and the early removal of teenage girls from schools for marriage. In 2006, UNICEF supported the government's effort to publish textbooks for ethnic minorities, and in 2007 new Yazidi language textbooks appeared in some Yazidi schools around the country. Also through Armenian government support the first Yazidi newspaper was published named Ezdikhana (formerly called Denge Ezdia or Yazidi Voice).

Armenia has been described as "the best country for their survival as a community" by some Yazidis. However, according to several reports, harassment against Yazidis exists in the country at non-state level. In a 2007 U.S. Department of State human rights report states that "as in previous years, Yazidi leaders did not complain that police and local authorities subjected their community to discrimination".

In August 2021, the Office of the United Nations High Commissioner for Human Rights released a statement urging Armenian authorities to stop intimidating Sashik Sultanyan, the founder of the Yazidi Center for Human Rights. Sultanyan faces charges of "criminal incitement of hatred and violence" in connection with an interview he gave about Yazidi issues in Armenia.

== Distribution ==
Yazidis in Armenia by provinces
Province (marz)	Yazidis	% of Yazidis in Armenia
Armavir	17,665	43.5%
Aragatsotn	6,405	15.8%
Ararat	5,940	14.6%
Yerevan	4,733	11.6%
Kotayk	4,097	10.1%
Shirak	974	2.4%
Lori	793	1.9%
Gegharkunik	8	
Syunik	4	
Tavush	1	
Vayots Dzor	0	
Total	40,620	100%

There are 22 rural settlements in Armenia with Yazidi majority. The biggest Yazidi village in Armenia is Verin Artashat in Ararat Province with 4,270 residents.

=== Aragatsotn Province ===
There are 19 Yazidi-inhabited villages in Aragatsotn Province.

Aragats district
- Sadunts (Amre Taza)
- Avshen
- Derek
- Mirak
- Shenkani
- Jamshlu
- Rya Taza
- Sangyar
- Sipan
- Ortachya
Talin district
- Metsadzor (Avtona)
- Baysz
- Barozh
- Gyalto
- Tlik
- Hakko
- Ghabaghtapa
- Sorik
Ashtarak district
- Shamiram

=== Armavir Province ===
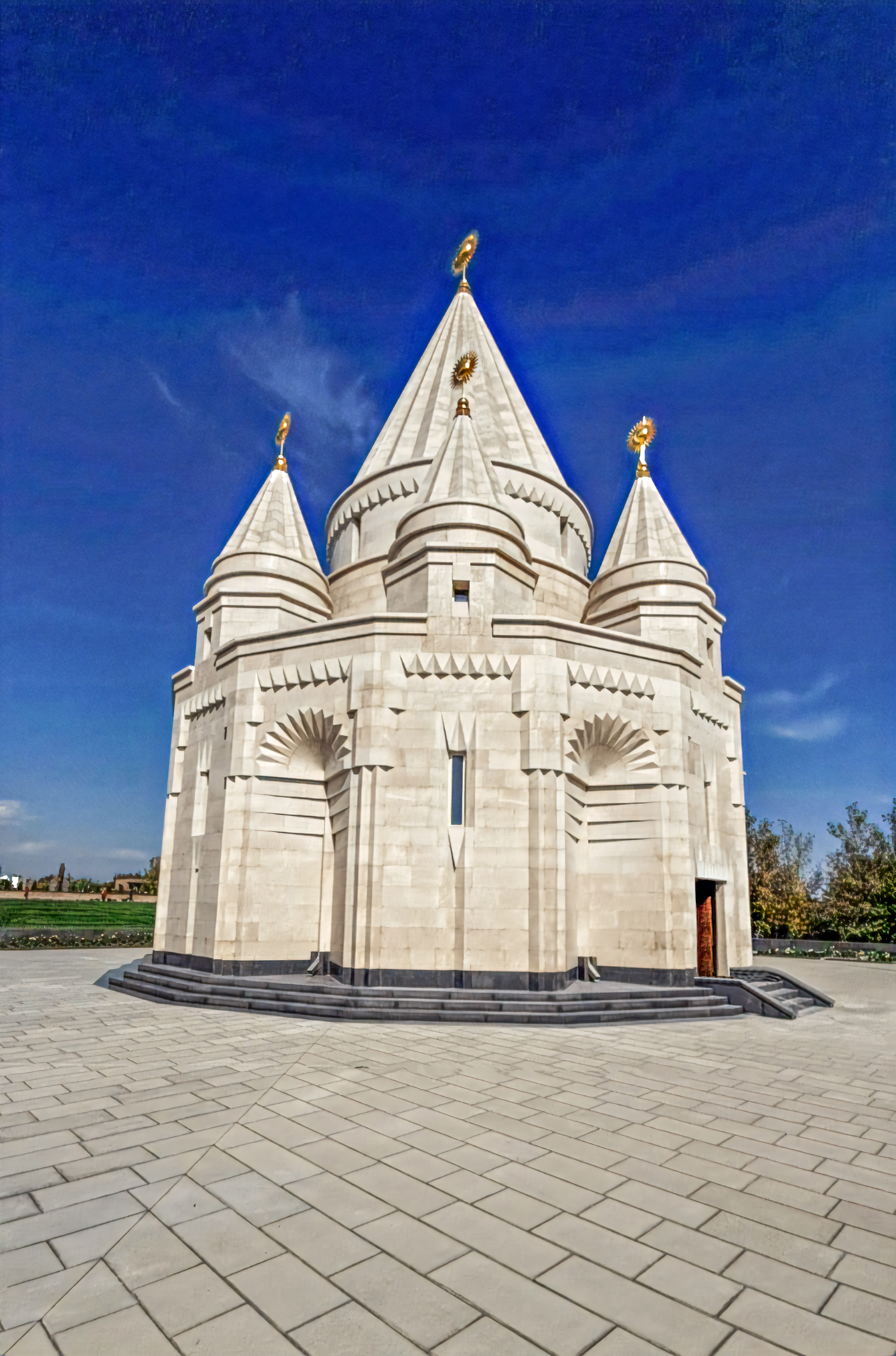
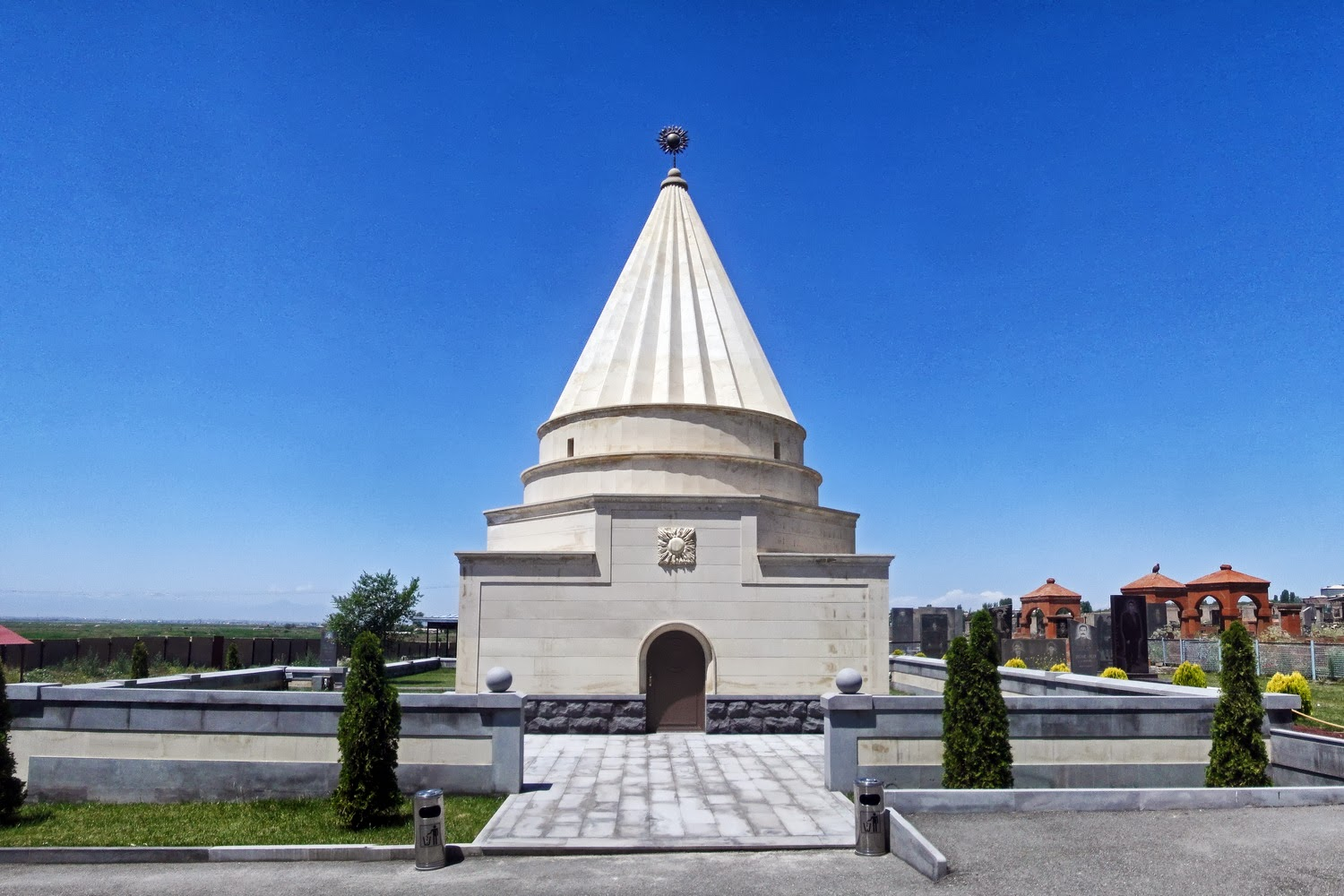
Quba Mere Diwane (left) and Ziarat (right) temples in Aknalich, Armavir Province.

There are two Yazidi villages in Armavir Province: Yeraskhahun and Ferik, both in the former Ejmiatsin district.

On 29 September 2012, Yazidis opened their first temple outside their Lalish homeland, the temple of Ziarat in Aknalich in the Armavir Province of Armenia. In September 2019, the world's largest Yazidi temple was opened next to the temple of Ziarat under the name Quba Mere Diwane.

=== Ararat Province ===
The only Yazidi village in Ararat Province is Verin Artashat, near Artashat.

== Notable Armenian-Yazidi people ==
- Aziz Tamoyan
- Amar Suloev
- Roman Amoyan
- Zara Mgoyan
- Emerîkê Serdar
- Emînê Evdal
- Arab Shamilov
- Eskerê Boyîk
- Heciyê Cindî
- Faizo Shamoyan
- Têmûrê Xelîl
- Tosinê Reşîd
- Xelîlê Çaçan Mûradov
- Jalile Jalil
- Jangir Agha
- Ordîxanê Celîl
- Khanna Omarkhali
- Kyaram Sloyan
- Usuv Beg
- Haje Bakoyan

== See also ==
- Index of articles related to the Yezidis
- Kurds in Armenia
- Yezidi National Union ULE
