= Freedom of religion in Armenia =

The Constitution of Armenia as amended in December 2005 provides for freedom of religion; however, the law places some restrictions on the religious freedom of adherents of minority religious groups, and there were some restrictions in practice. The Armenian Apostolic Church, which has formal legal status as the national church, enjoys some privileges not available to other religious groups. Some denominations reported occasional discrimination by mid- or low-level government officials but found high-level officials to be tolerant. Jehovah's Witnesses reported that judges sentenced them to longer prison terms for evasion of alternative military service than in the past, although the sentences were still within the range allowed by law. Societal attitudes toward some minority religious groups were ambivalent, and there were reports of societal discrimination directed against members of these groups.

== Religious demography ==
The country has an area of 11,500 square miles (30,000 km^{2}) and a population of 3 million.

Approximately 98 percent of the population is ethnically Armenian. As a result of Soviet-era policies, most people are religious practitioners who are not active in church, but the link between Armenian ethnicity and the Armenian Church is very strong. An estimated 90 percent of citizens belong to the Armenian Church, an independent Eastern Christian denomination with its spiritual center at the Etchmiadzin Cathedral and monastery. The head of the church is Catholicos Garegin (Karekin) II.

There are small communities of other religious groups. There was no reliable census data on religious minorities, and estimates from congregants varied significantly. The Catholic Church, both Roman and Mekhitarist (Armenian Uniate), estimated 120,000 followers. The Jehovah's Witnesses estimated their membership at 9,000. Groups that constitute less than 5 percent of the population include Yazidis, an ethnic Kurd cultural group whose religion includes elements derived from Zoroastrianism, Islam, and animism; unspecified "charismatic" Christians; the Armenian Evangelical Church; Molokans, an ethnic Russian pacifist Christian group that split from the Russian Orthodox Church in the 17th-century; Baptists; the Church of Jesus Christ of Latter-day Saints (Mormons); Orthodox Christians; Seventh-day Adventists; Pentecostals; Jews; and Baha'is. Levels of membership in minority religious groups remained relatively unchanged. There was no estimate of the number of atheists.

Yezidis are concentrated primarily in agricultural areas around Mount Aragats, northwest of the capital Yerevan. Armenian Catholics live mainly in the northern region, while most Jews, Mormons, Baha'is, and Orthodox Christians reside in Yerevan. In Yerevan there is also a small community of Muslims, including Kurds, Iranians, and temporary residents from the Middle East.

Foreign missionary groups are active in the country, however, most Armenians think that it is incompatible with their values.

== Status of religious freedom ==
=== Legal and policy framework ===
The Constitution as amended in 2005 provides for freedom of religion and the right to practice, choose, or change religious belief. It recognizes "the exclusive mission of the Armenian Church as a national church in the spiritual life, development of the national culture, and preservation of the national identity of the people of Armenia." The law places some restrictions on the religious freedom of religious groups other than the Armenian Church. The Law on Freedom of Conscience establishes the separation of church and state but grants the Armenian Church official status as the national church.

Extended negotiations between the government and the Armenian Church resulted in a 2000 framework for the two sides to negotiate a concordat. The negotiations resulted in the signing of a law March 14, 2007, that codified the church's role.

The law establishes confessor-penitent confidentiality, makes the church's marriage rite legally binding, and assigns the church and the state joint responsibility to preserve national historic churches. The law does not grant the church tax-exempt status or establish any state funding for the church. The law formally recognizes the role that the Armenian Church already plays in society, since most citizens see the church as an integral part of national identity, history, and cultural heritage.

January 6, the day on which the Armenian Church celebrates Christmas, is a national holiday.

The law does not mandate registration of nongovernmental organizations (NGOs), including religious groups; however, only registered organizations have legal status. Only registered groups may publish newspapers or magazines, rent meeting places, broadcast programs on television or radio, or officially sponsor the visas of visitors, although there is no prohibition on individual members doing so. There were no reports of the Government refusing registration to religious groups that qualified for registration under the law. To qualify for registration, religious organizations must "be free from materialism and of a purely spiritual nature," and must subscribe to a doctrine based on "historically recognized holy scriptures." The Office of the State Registrar registers religious entities. The Department of Religious Affairs and National Minorities oversees religious affairs and performs a consultative role in the registration process. A religious organization must have at least 200 adult members to register. By the end of the reporting period, the Government had registered 63 religious organizations, including individual congregations within the same denomination.

According to the Department of Religious Affairs and National Minorities, some minority religious groups, including the Molokans and some Yezidi groups, have not sought registration. Although it was not registered as a religious facility, Yerevan's sole mosque was open for regular Friday prayers, and the Government did not restrict Muslims from praying there.

The Law on Education mandates that public schools offer a secular education but does not prohibit religious education in state schools. Only personnel authorized and trained by the Government may teach in public schools. Classes in religious history are part of the public school curriculum and are taught by teachers. The history of the Armenian Church is the basis of this curriculum; many schools teach about world religions in elementary school and the history of the Armenian Church in middle school. Religious groups may not provide religious instruction in schools, although registered groups may do so in private homes to children of their members. The use of public school buildings for religious "indoctrination" is illegal.

The law on alternative military service allows conscientious objectors, subject to government panel approval, to perform either noncombatant military or civilian service duties rather than serve as combat-trained military personnel. The law took effect in 2004 and applied to subsequent draftees and those serving prison terms for draft evasion. An amendment to the law on military service that took effect in January 2006 criminalizes evasion of alternative labor service. Conscientious objectors maintained, however, that military control of the alternative labor service amounted to unacceptable military service.

The military employs Armenian Church chaplains for each division, but no other religious groups are represented in the military chaplaincy. The Armenian Church runs a prison ministry program but does not have permanent representatives in prisons. The Armenian Evangelical Church has chaplains in seven prisons.

The Government's human rights ombudsman and the head of the Department of Religious Affairs and National Minorities met with minority religious organizations during the reporting period.

=== Restrictions on religious freedom ===
The law places some restrictions on the religious freedom of adherents of minority religious groups, and there were some restrictions in practice.

The Law on Freedom of Conscience prohibits "proselytizing" but does not define it. The prohibition applies to all groups, including the Armenian Church. Most registered religious groups reported no serious legal impediments to their activities during the reporting period.

Although the law prohibits foreign funding of foreign-based denominations, the Government did not enforce the ban and considered it unenforceable.

During the reporting period, the Jehovah's Witnesses and Seventh-day Adventists reported that low-level government officials denied them the use of public space for religious gatherings. However, the Jehovah's Witnesses noted that, in general, they were free to assemble without harassment by police or other government entities.

A customs issue pertaining to the Jehovah's Witnesses ability to obtain shipments of religious literature was not resolved at the end of the reporting period. On March 29, 2007, customs officials in Yerevan reevaluated a shipment of religious periodicals received by the Jehovah's Witnesses at a significantly higher rate than the group expected, making it financially difficult for them to arrange clearance of the shipment. Customs officials maintained that the reevaluation complied with the customs code.

At the end of the reporting period, the Jehovah's Witnesses reported that following complaints to high-ranking officials, the military commissariat had issued certificates of registration (necessary for obtaining passports) to the majority of a group of Witnesses who had completed prison sentences for conscientious objection to military service.

According the Foreign Policy Centre, "The church's problems mirror that of the wider elite: the lack of transparency and atmosphere of corruption which will undermine public trust over the longer term."

What is quite interesting is that according to a survey conducted by Caucasus Research Resource Centers (CRRC),"The trust in religious institutions is high despite low rates of religiosity (as measured by religious practice) in Armenia".

=== Abuses of religious freedom ===
According to leaders of Jehovah's Witnesses in Yerevan, as of the end of the reporting period, 69 Witnesses remained in prison for refusal, on conscientious and religious grounds, to perform military service or alternative labor service. Two additional members were awaiting trial. Representatives of the Jehovah's Witnesses stated that all of the prisoners were given the opportunity to serve an alternative to military service rather than prison time, but that all refused because the military retained administrative control of alternative service.

Jehovah's Witnesses complained that the courts handed down tougher sentences for evasion of alternative labor service during the reporting period. In the period covered by this report, of the 48 Jehovah's Witnesses sentenced, 24 received 30-month sentences and 5 received 36-month sentences, the maximum allowed by law. Of the remaining 19 Jehovah's Witnesses sentenced during the reporting period, 15 received sentences ranging between 22 and 27 months, and 4 received 18-month sentences. Of 36 Jehovah's Witnesses convicted during the previous reporting period, only 1 received a 30-month sentence, and none received 36-month sentences; the majority were sentenced to either 18 or 24 months of imprisonment.

Unlike during the previous reporting period, there were no reports that military hazing of new conscripts was more severe for minority group members. Yezidi representatives reported no harassment or discrimination.

During the reporting period there was no reported officially sponsored violence against minority religious groups. Other than Jehovah's Witnesses who were conscientious objectors, there were no reports of religious prisoners or detainees in the country.

=== Improvements and Positive Developments in Respect for Religious Freedom ===
Nineteen Jehovah's Witnesses who had begun and then abandoned alternative military service were acquitted, and criminal proceedings against them were terminated by a decision of the Prosecutor General on September 12, 2006. The individuals were charged with desertion or absence without leave. Seven of the 19 had been in pretrial detention or agreed not to leave the country before their trials at the time of their acquittal. The others had received sentences ranging from 2 to 3 years in prison and served between 5 and 9 months of their sentences.

On October 27, 2006, Yerevan's Holocaust memorial, which had been inexplicably vandalized earlier in the year, was replaced and rededicated to the memory of both Jews and Armenians who had been the victims of "heinous crimes." A gesture of respect and national empathy, the memorial was erected with the cooperation of international donors, the Jewish community, Armenian Diaspora organizations, and the Government.

== Societal abuses and discrimination ==
Societal attitudes toward most minority religious groups were ambivalent. Most Armenians think that only the Armenian Apostolic Church is compatible with their values, because the link between Armenian ethnicity and the Armenian Church is very strong.

According to some observers, the general population expressed negative attitudes about Jehovah's Witnesses because the latter refused to serve in the military, engaged in little-understood proselytizing practices, and because of an inaccurate but widespread belief that they pay the desperately poor to convert. Jehovah's Witnesses continued to be targets of hostile sermons by some Armenian Church clerics and experienced occasional societal discrimination. Unlike in the previous reporting period, the press did not report complaints of allegedly illegal proselytizing lodged by citizens against members of Jehovah's Witnesses.

On June 1, 2007, in the village of Lusarat, a passing Armenian Apostolic priest verbally harassed and assaulted two Jehovah's Witnesses having a Bible discussion with a woman in the central square. While the Witnesses agreed to drop assault charges pending the priest's apology, none was forthcoming. Police closed the case for lack of evidence after the priest denied the incident.

Two Jehovah's Witnesses filed a complaint with local police after they were allegedly threatened by a man with a pistol while they engaged in public ministry on April 15, 2007. Police did not investigate the incident, citing lack of evidence.

At the end of the reporting period, a Witness dropped his case against a co-worker who had attacked him. Police had taken no action on the matter. On March 29, 2007, the co-worker had attempted to choke the Witness at their place of work after discovering that the latter was a member of the religious group.

The group also reported that an Armenian Church priest assaulted two female Jehovah's Witnesses on August 21, 2006. According to the group, one of the victims suffered a broken arm. Police refused to initiate an investigation, in part because the priest expressed remorse, and the women were unable to appeal the decision.

In isolated incidents, some members of the press stoked suspicion of "nontraditional" religious organizations. On February 14, 2007, online news source Panorama published an article based on an e-mail from a reader that accused several famous Armenian singers and a television commentator of being "followers of religious sects." On February 13, 2007, online news source A1+ published an article warning readers about "false Bibles" distributed by "sectarian organizations."

The Jewish community reported no incidents of verbal harassment during the reporting period. In the summer and fall of 2006, a number of spray-painted swastikas of unknown origin, accompanied by the words "No Arabs," "Sieg Heil," and "Russians out of our country," were observed on kiosks and construction site walls in downtown Yerevan; the symbols appeared to express general xenophobia.

== 2020s ==
In 2020, the National Security Service opened an investigation into Yazidi activist Sashik Sultanyan after he publicly stated that Yazidis experience discrimination in Armenia. The trial was in progress in 2022.

In 2023, Armenia was scored 2 out of 4 for religious freedom by Freedom House, an organization associated with the US State Department.

== See also ==
- Religion in Armenia
- Human rights in Armenia
