= Yeraskhahun =

Village in Armavir, Armenia

Yeraskhahun Երասխահուն
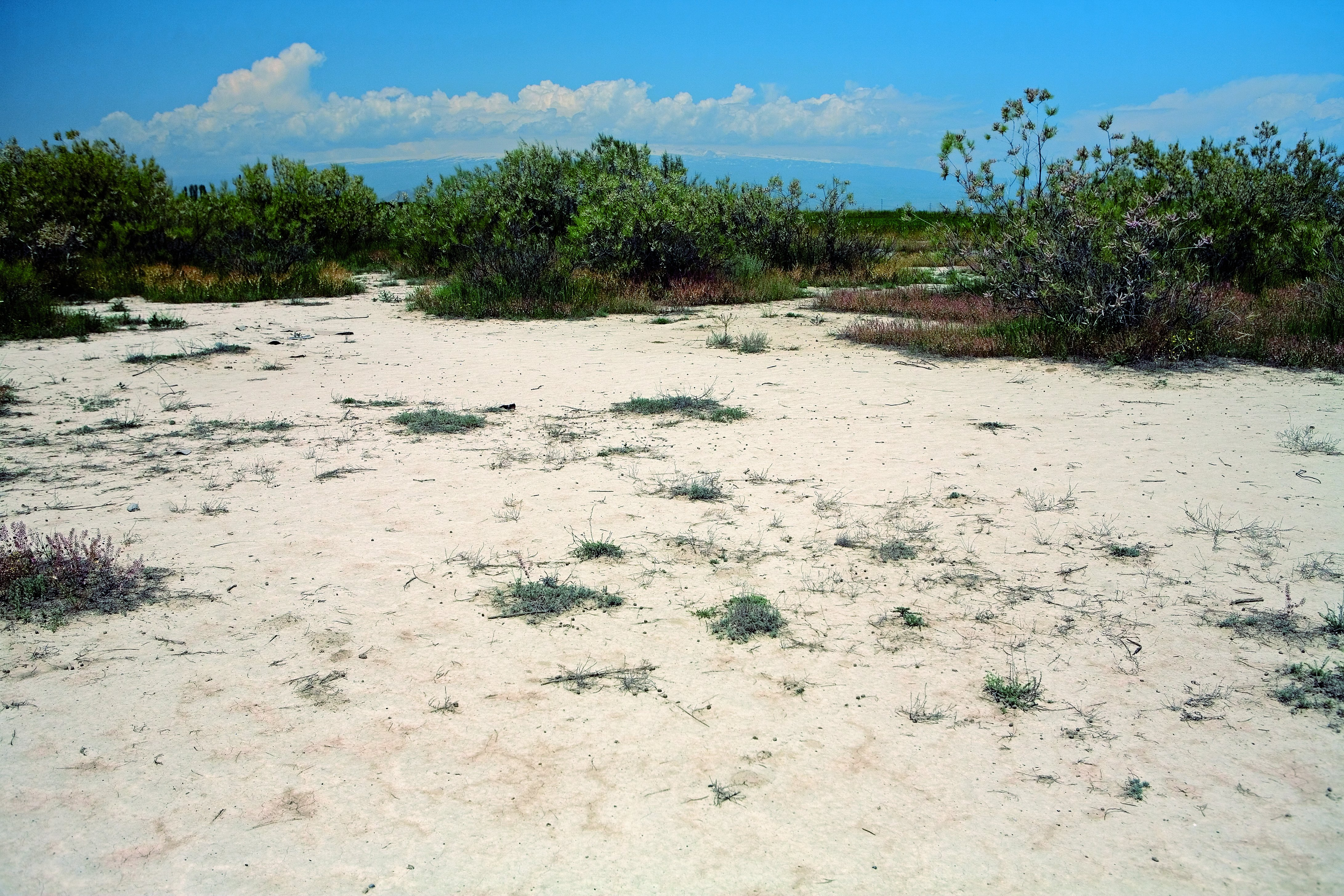
- Salt desert in Yeraskhahun

- Location within Armenia
- Coordinates: 40°04′20″N 44°12′57″E
- Country: Armenia
- Marz (Province): Armavir
- Founded: 1920

Population (2011)
  - Total: 1,834
- Time zone: UTC+4 ( )
  - Summer (DST): UTC+5 ( )

Yeraskhahun (Armenian: Երասխահուն, until 1950, Kuru-Araz) is a village in the Armavir Province of Armenia. Half of the population (around 930) of the village are Yazidis.

== See also ==
- Armavir Province
