= Hrachya Kochar =

Armenian writer (1910–1965)

Hrachya Kochar Հրաչյա Քոչար
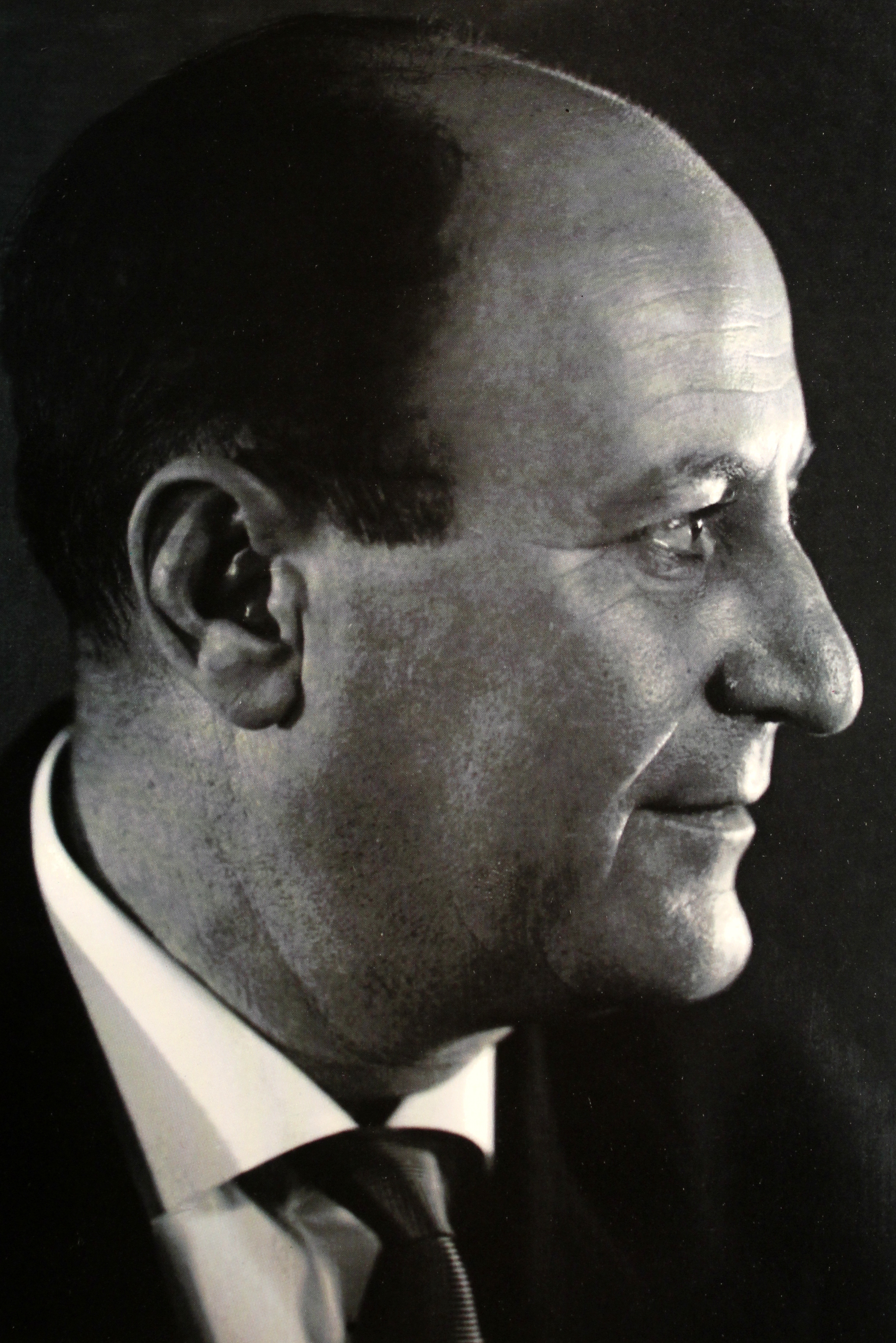
- Born: Hrachya Gabrielyan; 19 January 1910; Kumlubucak, Erzurum vilayet, Ottoman Empire
- Died: 2 May 1965; Yerevan, Armenian SSR, Soviet Union
- Education: Yerevan State University
- Occupations: Writer, publicist
- Writing career
- Notable awards: Red Star Award, National Prize of Armenian SSR

Hrachya Kochar (Armenian: Հրաչյա Քոչար; 19 January 1910 – 2 May 1965), born Hrachya Kochari Gabrielyan, was an Armenian writer and publicist. He won the first state prize of the Armenian SSR for his novella Patriarch (Nahapet), which was adapted into a film of the same name in 1977.

== Biography ==
Hrachya Gabrielian was born in 1910 in the Ottoman Empire, in the village of Kumlubucak (now located in the Taşlıçay district of the Ağrı Province of Turkey), historically located in the province of Bagrevand in Western Armenia. He lost both of his parents in the Armenian genocide: his mother died during their flight to Eastern Armenia, while his father, Kochar, also known as Kocho, who fought in Andranik's army, died in 1918. Hrachya Kochar chose his pseudonym in honor of his father. Along with other people from his village, Hrachya managed to escape the massacres and reach the Ejmiatsin region. He worked as a shepherd and as a pitman in the mines of Alaverdi.

In 1927, Kochar moved to Yerevan. He was accepted to the faculty of philology of Yerevan State University and published his first story, titled "Khaje", in 1931 in the monthly Nor Ughi (New Path). In 1934, he edited the Kurdish-language newspaper Ria Taza. He became a member of the Union of Soviet Writers in 1934 and of the Communist Party in 1939.

He denounced the poet Yeghishe Charents during the Great Purge in 1937; Charents died in custody. In 1939, Kochar was penalized by the Party and left unemployed until Martiros Saryan found him work in the Committee for the Preservation of Historical Monuments. Kochar traveled around the Armenian republic to investigate the state of Armenian monasteries and chapels, summarizing his findings in the Album-Guidebook of the Goris and Sisian Regions.

From 1941 to 1945, Kochar served as a newspaper correspondent in the Red Army and participated in World War II. Kochar's writings from the front were published in a series of collections, starting with The Birth of Heroes (Herosneri tsnunde) in 1942. One of his short stories written during the war, "The General's Sister", was published in Pravda in 1945 and later translated into 24 languages. In his last years, he published White Book, a collection of stories that included the novellas Patriarch (Nahapet), The Yearning and Euphrates Bridge.

From 1946 to 1951, he was the secretary of the Writers Union of Armenia and the editor of the monthly Sovetakan Grakanutyun (Soviet Literature). In 1954 he edited the satirical magazine Vozni. That same year, Kochar chaired the rehabilitation committee for Charents. He also called for a reassessment of the poet's legacy in a speech before the 17th Armenian Party Congress in February 1954, likely with the "backstage encouragement" of Anastas Mikoyan. The latter would call for the rehabilitation of Charents in Yerevan one month later. Nevertheless, Kochar was "one of the very few public intellectuals in Armenia" who criticized de-Stalinization and expressed his "disagreement" with the 20th Party Congress and Nikita Khrushchev's "Secret Speech".

Kochar worked on another novel, Children of the Great House, which was published in two volumes in 1959. An Armenian Sketchbook, Vasily Grossman's account of the two months he spent in Yerevan in late 1961, recounts his experience in helping to polish up the Russian translation of the novel. Throughout the book, Grossman refers to Kochar as "Martirosyan" and reflects upon his apparently difficult relationship with him.

Kochar wrote the script for the film Hyusisayin Tsiatsan (Northern Rainbow, Hayfilm, 1961). His works have been translated into Russian and other languages. He died in Yerevan in 1965.

== Prizes ==
- Order of the Red Star
- State Prize of Armenian SSR for Patriarch
