= Heciyê Cindî =

Yazidi writer

Heciyê Cindî (Armenian: Հաջիե Ջնդի Ջաուարի; March 18, 1908 – May 1, 1990) was a Kurdish linguist and researcher from Armenia.

Cindî was born into a Yazidi Kurdish family in the village of Yemençayir (Emançayîr) near Kars in modern Turkey. During World War I and Turkish and Soviet invasions, his family fled to Armenia and settled in the village of Elegez. Later on, he lost all his family (except for one brother) to disease and massacre. In 1919, he stayed in the American orphanage in Alexandropol, and in 1926 was transferred to the orphanage in Leninakan, Armenia.

During 1929–30, Cindî taught in the villages of Qundexsaz and Elegez, and was head of the cultural section of the Kurdish newspaper Riya Teze in 1930. He also worked as a news anchor in the Kurdish section of Radio Yerevan. In 1933, he joined the Writers Union of Armenia and attended the meeting of the Congress of the Soviet Writers the following year. In 1937, during Joseph Stalin's purges, he was imprisoned on March 18, 1937, on charges of spying, nationalism, being a Yezidi and helping counter-revolutionaries. After one year, several Armenian intellectuals campaigned for his release and he was pardoned, but was not allowed to work; however, with Alexander Fadeyev's help and support, he was able to resume his literary work.

In 1940, Cindî received his PhD in Kurdish folklore, and in 1941 the Armenian government, put him in charge of changing Kurdish alphabet from Latin to Cyrillic. The new alphabet was approved and published in 1946, and it was used in Kurdish education in Armenia, Georgia and several Central Asian republics. In 1959, he was employed in the Oriental department of Armenian Academy of Sciences, where he headed the Kurdology section for the next eight years.

In 1940 and 1952 his book Kurdish Fairy Tales was published in Armenian, in 1959 in Kurmanji Kurdish (Һ’ьк’йа̄тед щьмаә’тә к’ӧрдие; Latin transliteration: ḧikyatêd cime'ete kurdîê).

From 1968 to 1974, Cindî taught Kurdish literature and language at the Oriental Faculty of the University of Yerevan. He wrote and translated many books, among them 15 books on folklore and literature, 33 textbooks for schools, 19 translations and 7 books in pedagogy.

== See also ==
- List of Kurdish scholars
- Yazidis in Armenia

== Books ==
1. Kurmanji Folklore, with Emînê Evdal, 1936.
2. Hikayetên Civata Kurdan (Kurdish Social Stories), Yerevan, 1959. (Re-published by Apec, 112 pp., Sweden, 1996. ISBN 91-87730-94-4 )
3. Mesele û Xeberokên Cimeta Kurda (Proverbs of the Kurdish Society), 800 pp., 1985.
4. Hewarî, Novel, 422 pp., Roja Nû Publishers, Stockholm, 1999. ISBN 91-7672-045-4
