= Xelîlê Çaçan Mûradov =

Kurdish journalist (1924–1981)

Xelîlê Çaçan Mûradov (1924–1981), was a Kurdish writer and journalist in the Soviet Union. He was head of Kurdish section of Radio Yerevan for almost 24 years, where more than 1400 folkloric Kurdish songs were recorded under his supervision. He has also authored several books on Kurdish folklore. He was the father of Kurdish writer and journalist Têmûrê Xelîl.

== See also ==
- Yazidis in Armenia

== Books ==
1. Kilamên Cimaeta Kurdan, 1963.
2. Du Poêm (Folk stories of Memê û Eyşê and Zembîlfiroş in poetry), 1965.
3. Qisên Cimaetê (Collection of Folklore), 1969.
4. Morîyê Nenê, Novel, 1972.
