= Sashik Sultanyan =

Armenian Yazidi human rights activist

Sashik Sultanyan (Armenian: Սաշիկ Սուլթանյանի) is an Armenian human rights activist. A member of Armenia's Yazidi minority, Sultanyan founded the Yezidi Centre for Human Rights, which advocated for the preservation of Yazidi culture and language, as well as the integration of Yazidis and other ethnic minorities into Armenian society.

== Activism ==
Sultanyan was born into a Yazidi family in Armenia, where Yazidis constitute the largest ethnic minority in the country. He first began publicly advocating for the rights of Yazidis in 2013, first as a youth activist and subsequently as a minority fellow at the Office of the United Nations High Commissioner for Human Rights. In 2018, Sultanyan founded the nongovernmental organisation, the Yezidi Centre for Human Rights, which focused on community mobilisation and education and integration activism for ethnic minorities living in Armenia.

=== Criminal investigation and subsequent trial ===
==== Investigation ====
In June 2020, the Iraq-based Yazidi News website published an interview with Sultanyan in which he spoke about the difficulties facing Yazidis living in Armenia. He stated that Yazidis faced discrimination by Armenian authorities; that they were unable to properly study their language and culture; and that they were underrepresented in local government. Sultanyan also accused oligarchs of seizing Yazidi properties and described how Yazidis were living in fear and poverty as a result.

On 3 October 2020, the National Security Service launched a criminal investigation into Sultanyan following a complaint made by Narek Malyan, the leader of the far-right Veto Movement. Malyan accused Sultanyan of being affiliated with George Soros after receiving a grant from Soros' Open Society Foundations, and that Sultanyan sought to "sow ethnic conflict" in an attempt to overthrow the Armenian government.

While Sultanyan was aware of an NSS investigation, he was not told the reasoning behind the investigation until 20 May 2021, when the NSS searched his home, as well as the offices of the Yezidi Centre for Human Rights in Yerevan, confiscating three computers. This led to the temporary halting of the centre's work due to the loss of its technical equipment. Sultanyan stated that his interview with Yazidi News had been a private conversation that had been published without his consent.

On 29 July 2021, the NSS submitted their investigation to the Prosecutor General's Office, issuing an indictment against Sultanyan for inciting national enmity among Yazidis, in breach of article 226 of Armenia's criminal code.

==== Trial ====
Sultanyan's trial commenced in November 2021 at the Yerevan General Jurisdiction Court. Prosecutors stated that Yazidis did not experience discrimination in Armenia, and accused Sultanyan of attempting to "hoodwink" Yazidis. They cited evidence including previous comments made by Sultanyan in which he described some Yazidis as living "prosperously", as well as several Yazidi witnesses who disputed Sultanyan's claims.

Sultanyan's defence was led by lawyers from the Helsinki Citizens' Assembly–Vanadzor, a local human rights organisation; he pled not guilty to the charges. They stated that the NSS began wiretapping Sultanyan in April 2020, five months prior to the start of their official investigation, and that there was no evidence of criminality by Sultanyan during that time. They also criticised the NSS' focus on Malyan's "suspicious" criminal complaint, citing both Malyan's previous targeting of human rights activists on dubious charges, in addition to describing Malyan's translation of the Yazidi News article (which had originally been published in Arabic) as being inaccurate and not professionally translated into Armenian. Sultanyan stated that his criticisms had been aimed at Armenian authorities, and not Armenian people.

==== Response ====
Human Rights Watch accused Armenian authorities of attempting to interfere with Sultanyan's human rights activism, by falsely equating his freedom of speech with criminal incitement, and called for the charges against Sultanyan to be dropped. Both the Council of Europe and the United Nations released public statements calling for the charges to be reversed.
