= Jangir Agha =

National hero of the Yazidis (c. 1874–1943)

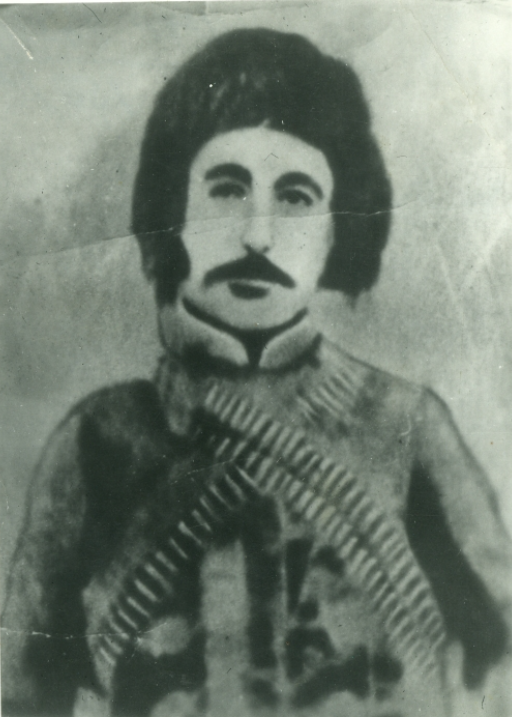
- Born: 1874; Çubuklu, Van vilayet, Ottoman Empire
- Died: 1943 (aged 68–69) Saratov, Soviet Union
- Conflicts: World War I; Caucasus campaign; Battle of Bash Abaran; February Uprising

Jangir Agha (Kurdish: Cangîr Axa, Cîhangîr Axa, Armenian: Ջահանգիր Աղա, Russian: Джаангир Ага, c. 1874–1943) was a prominent Yazidi military and social figure of Armenia in the early 20th century. He is considered a national hero of the Kurdish Yazidi people. He died in prison in 1943 after being arrested during the Great Purge in 1938; he was posthumously rehabilitated.

== Early life ==
He was born to a Kurds-Yazidi family in Çubuklu village of Van Vilayet of Ottoman Empire. A number of songs are written about Jangir Agha in Kurmanji Kurdish by the Kurds-Yazidis.

== Early revolutionary activities ==
Around 1909, Jangir Agha met with Andranik, the champion of Armenian independence from the Turkish Empire. Jangir Agha supported the Armenian nationalists, providing them with military and material aid.

== World War I ==
During the First World War, he was the commander of the irregular cavalry as a tribal leader. At the beginning of the war, Jangir Agha's First Nodist Yezidi regiment tried not to engage in combat operations against the Russian army. In 1915, after the capture of Van by the Russian army, Jangir Agha with his regiment and four other Kurdish and Yezidi regiments led by Usub Bek Temuryan, Najid Bey, Osman Agha and Husein Bey went over to the side of the Russians.

During the Armenian-Turkish battles in 1918 he greatly helped in the Armenian victory over the Turks and Sunni Kurds in the village of Molabalzet. Agha participated in the Battle of Bash Abaran, which took place on May 16-18, 1918, with his Yazidi battalion of three hundred horsemen against the Turkish Army, which had invaded Armenia.

== February uprisings ==
He welcomed the establishment of Soviet power in Armenia in 1920. He later joined in the anti-Bolshevik revolts of February 18, 1921 and participated in battles for Yerevan.

== Last years ==
He was arrested in 1938 during the Great Purge and died in 1943 at the age of 69 in one of the Saratov prisons. His body was posthumously rehabilitated in 1959 to be buried in his native village.

== See also ==
- Yazidis in Armenia
