= Eskerê Boyîk =

Armenian Yazidi writer and poet

Eskerê Boyîk (born 1941) is a Kurdish poet and writer. He was born into a Kurds–Yazidi family at the village of Qundexsaz in Armenia. He went to school in his village and later in the village of Elegez. He continued his studies in economics in Yerevan, and graduated in 1966. He has written many articles in Armenian and Russian. He is noted for his review of Soviet Kurdish literature. In the 1960s, he began writing poetry and articles in Kurdish. He is now living in Germany.

== See also ==
- Yazidis in Armenia

== Books ==
1. Şiverê, Poem, Yerevan, 1966.
2. Kulîlkên Çiya, Poem, Yerevan, 1975.
3. Sinco keça xwe dide mêr, Play, Yerevan, 1980.
4. Tîrênc, Poem, Yerevan, 1987.
5. Mem û Zîn, Play, Roja Nû Publishers, Stockholm, 1989, ISBN 91-7672-026-8.
6. Li Çiya, Short Story, Yerevan, 1991.
7. Duaya Serê Sibê, Poem, 80 pp., Roja Nû Publishers, Sweden, 1997.
8. Oda Çîrokan 1, Poems for Children, 104 pp., Roja nû Publishers, 1997, ISBN 91-7672-036-5.
9. Kulîlkên Birîndar, Poem, 288 pp., Stockholm, 1998, ISBN 91-7672-043-8.
10. Govenda Herfan, Poems for Children, Stockholm, 2002.
