= Emînê Evdal =

Armenian Kurdish writer, linguist, and poet

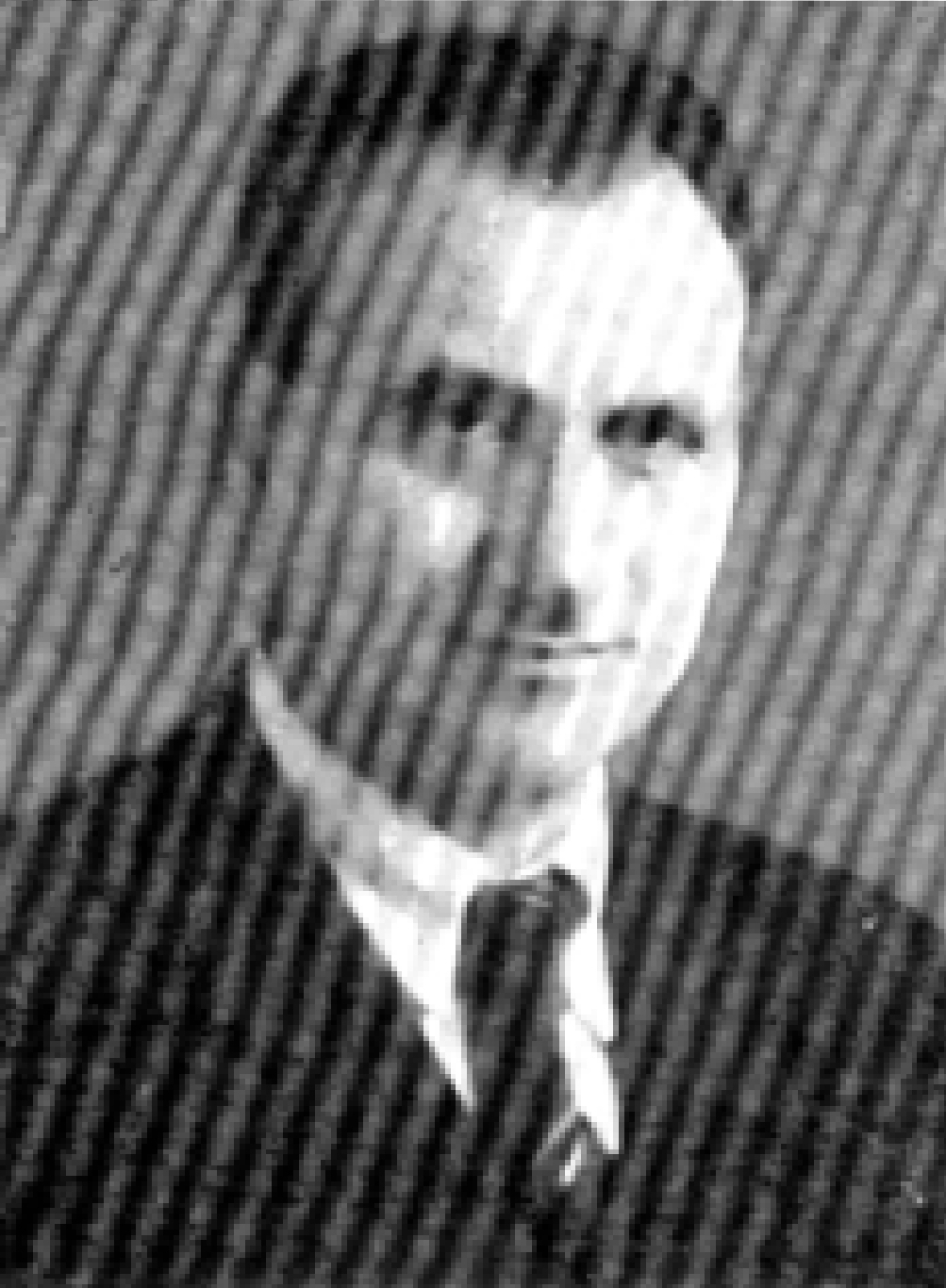
Emînê Evdal

Emînê Evdal (b. in 1906 in Yamançayir, Kars – 1964), was a Kurdish writer, linguist and poet who was based in Armenia. He was born into a Kurds–Yezidi family in the village of Yamançayir near Kars which at the time was under Russian control. His village was destroyed during the Armenian genocide where he lost both his parents and his brother. In 1924, he attended the workers' school in Tbilisi, and in 1926 he began teaching in the Kurdish villages near Mount Elegez (Alagyaz). In 1931, he entered the Philology department of University of Yerevan, and began working in the Kurdish newspaper Rya Taza around the same period. He published his first book on the Kurdish language in 1933. From 1933 to 1937, he published several textbooks on Kurdish language education. He received his PhD in Kurdology in 1944 and his thesis was entitled Kurdish woman in traditional family: An analysis based on study of folklore and nation. After graduation, he worked in the Kurdology field at the Armenian Institute of History, and he was hired by the Department of Oriental Studies, Armenian Academy of Sciences in 1959. He was awarded the title of Best Retired Teacher by the Parliament of Armenia in 1960.

In addition to Kurdish, he published many research articles and books in Armenian and Russian. He also contributed to Kurdish literature, and his first collection of short stories titled Casim û Tosin was published in 1924. The Kurdish school in the village of Qundesaz, where he taught for many years, has been named after him by the Armenia's government and his statue has been erected at the entrance of the school.

== Books ==
Books of Evdal:

1. Casim û Tosin, koma çîrokên kurt, 1924.
2. Kitêba Zimanê Kurmancî Bona Koma Çara, 1933.
3. Kitêba zimanê Kurmancî Bona Koma Pênca, 1934.
4. Bihar, Collection of Poems, 1935.
5. Kitêba Zimanê Kurmancî Bona Dersxana Çara, 1936.
6. Mêtodîka Hînkirina Xwendin û Nivîsandinê, 1936.
7. Folklora Kurmanca, 1936, (with Hecîyê Cindî).
8. Mêtodîka Zimanê Kurmancî, 1937.
9. Kitêba Zimanê Kurmancî, Bona Dersxana Şeşa, 1937, (with Casimê Celîl).
10. Tolhildana Xûnê Li Nav Kurdada û Dewî Anîna Bermayên Wê Li Ermenistana Sovêtê, 1952.
11. Deba kurdên Ermenistana Sovêtê, 1953.
12. Gulîzer, 1956. (in Armenian).
13. Patronîma cem kurdên Ermenistanê di sedsala 19 da, 1957.
14. Deba kurdên Pişkovkazê, 1957.
15. Çîrokên gelê kurd, 1957. (in Armenian).
16. Ferhenga Kurdîyê rastnivîsaryê, 1958.

== See also ==
- List of Kurdish scholars
