= Arab Shamilov =

Soviet Yazidi Kurdish novelist

Arab Shamoevich Shamilov
- Erebê Şemo
- Born: 23 January 1897; Susuz, Kars oblast, Russian Empire
- Died: 21 May 1978 (aged 81); Yerevan, Armenian SSR, Soviet Union
- Occupations: Writer, poet, journalist, interpreter
- Writing career
- Genres: Novel, story
- Notable awards: Honored Cultural Figure of the Armenian SSR (1967); Order of the Red Banner; Order of Friendship of Peoples; Jubilee Medal "In Commemoration of the 100th Anniversary since the Birth of Vladimir Il'ich Lenin"

Arab Shamilov (Kurdish: Ә'рәб Шамилов, also known as Erebê Şemo; 23 January 1897 – 1978) was a Yazidi-Kurdish novelist and scholar who lived in the Soviet Union.

== Early career ==
Arab Shamilov was born on 23 January 1897 in the village of Susuz in the Kars oblast, now located in eastern Turkey but then part of the Russian Empire. During World War I, from 1914 to 1917, he served as an interpreter for the Russian army. Later on, he became a member of the central committee of the Armenian Communist Party. In 1931, he began working on Kurdish literature at the Leningrad Institute of Oriental Studies. He assisted in developing a Latin-based alphabet for the Kurdish language in 1927.

He became a member of the editorial board of the Kurdish newspaper Ria Taza (The New Path), published in Yerevan from 1930 to 1937. In Leningrad, he also met the Kurdish linguist Qanate Kurdo and published his work as a document about Kurdish language in Armenia.

== Literary output ==
His first and most celebrated work, the story Şivanê kurmanca (The Kurdish Shepherd), based on his own life, was published in 1931. It is considered the first Kurmanji novel. It treated his early life as a shepherd and how he then became a communist and took part in the Russian Revolution of 1917. In 1937, he was exiled during Joseph Stalin's Great Purge and was only allowed to return to Armenia after 19 years, in 1956, during the Khrushchev Thaw.

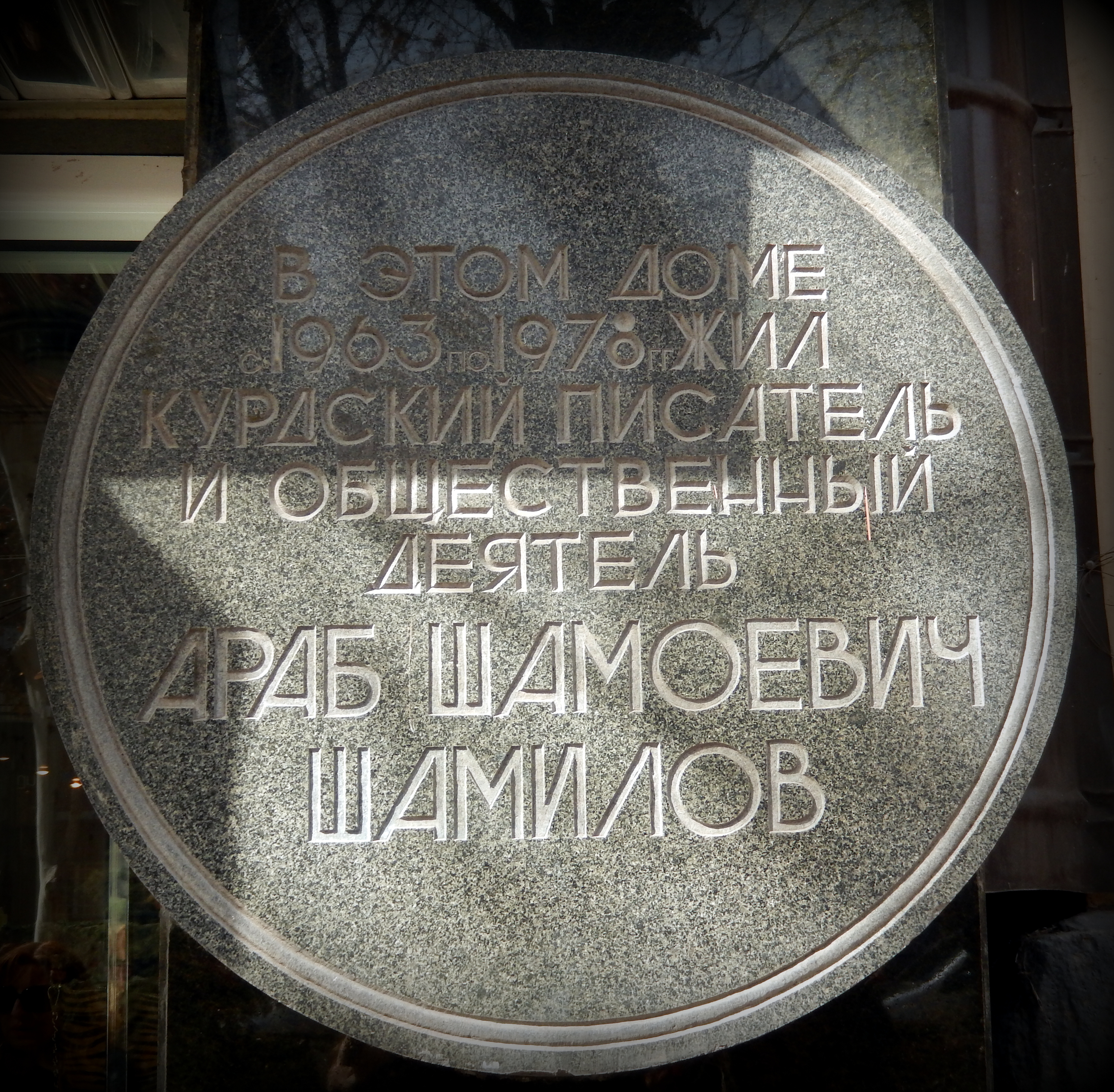
Arab Shamilov's plaque on Abovyan street of Yerevan

In 1959, he published another novel, Jiyana Bextewer (Happy Life) that was then translated into Armenian and later also into Russian (1965). In 1966, he published a historical novel, Dimdim, inspired by the old Kurdish folk tale of Kela Dimdimê about the Battle of Dimdim. It has been translated into Italian as Il castello di Dimdim. In 1967, he published a collection of Kurmanji folk stories in Moscow.

== Books ==
1. Şivanê kurmanca, the first Kurdish novel
2. Barbang (1958) (published in Yerevan by Haypetrat, 1959)
3. Jiyana Bextewer (1959) (re-release: Roja Nû Publishers, 1990, 253 p.)
4. Dimdim (1966) (re-release: Roja Nû Publishers, 1983, 205 p.)
5. Hopo (1969) (re-release: Roja Nû Publishers, 1990, 208 p.)

== See also ==
- List of Kurdish scholars
- Yazidis in Armenia
- Armenian victims of the Great Purge
