= Emerîkê Serdar =

Armenian Kurdish-Yezidi writer (1935–2018)

- Born: 8 February 1935 Pampa Kurda (Sipan, Armenia)
- Died: 19 February 2018 (aged 83)
- Occupation: Writer, journalist, publicist, translator

Website
- kurd.amarikesardar.com (Kurdish)

Emerîkê Serdar (Amarik Davreshovich Sardaryan) (8 February 1935 – 19 February 2018) was a Kurdish–Yazidi writer from Armenia. He was born in the village of Pampa Kurda (Sîpan) in Armenian SSR.

== Life and career ==
Emerîkê Serdar's parents, Dewrêşê Serdar and Seyra Khudo, were villagers. His father died in World War II when Serdar was less than six years old, leaving his mother, Seyra, to raise him alone. By the age of 15, Serdar had developed an interest in writing and journalism,

Serdar received his secondary education in the village of Alagyaz and graduated from the Faculty of History and Philology of an Armenian Pedagogical Institute named after Khachatur Abovyan.

He worked for three months in the village of Alagyaz, where he taught Armenian as well as Kurdish language and literature. In the same year in 1959, he began working for the Kurdish department of Radio Yerevan until 1962.

He was employed as a journalist for the Kurdish newspaper, Rya Taza, where he worked from 1962 until 2006. Throughout the years of working there, he also became a translator, head of the department of culture, executive secretary, deputy editor, and after 1991 he became chief editor of the newspaper until he retired in 2006.

Serdar was a member of the Union of Journalists of Armenia since 1965, and in 1995 a member of the Union of Writers of Armenia. He also was a member of the international club PEN Kurd. In 1980, Serdar was awarded the Certificate of Honor of the Presidium of the Supreme Soviet, for his active contributions and work as a journalist. In 1986 he was awarded the honorary title "Honored Journalist of the Armenian SSR". Serdar was twice appointed a delegate to the congresses of the Union of Journalists in the USSR, which were held in Moscow. After 1992, he was the chairman of the Board of the Council of the Kurdish Intelligentsia of Armenia.

== Works ==
Emerîkê authored hundreds of articles related to Kurdish culture, he also published a dozen of storybooks, many of which were in Kurdish.

1. "Destê dê" (Mother's hand) (1974)
2. “Îdî dereng bû” (It's too late) (1979)
3. “Dengê dil” (Voice of the Heart) (1985)
4. “Gundê me” (Our Village) (2006)
5. “Hisreta emir” (2008)
6. “Bijare” (2011)
7. “Keşkûl” (2013)
8. “Mukurî” (2014)
