= Têmûrê Xelîl =

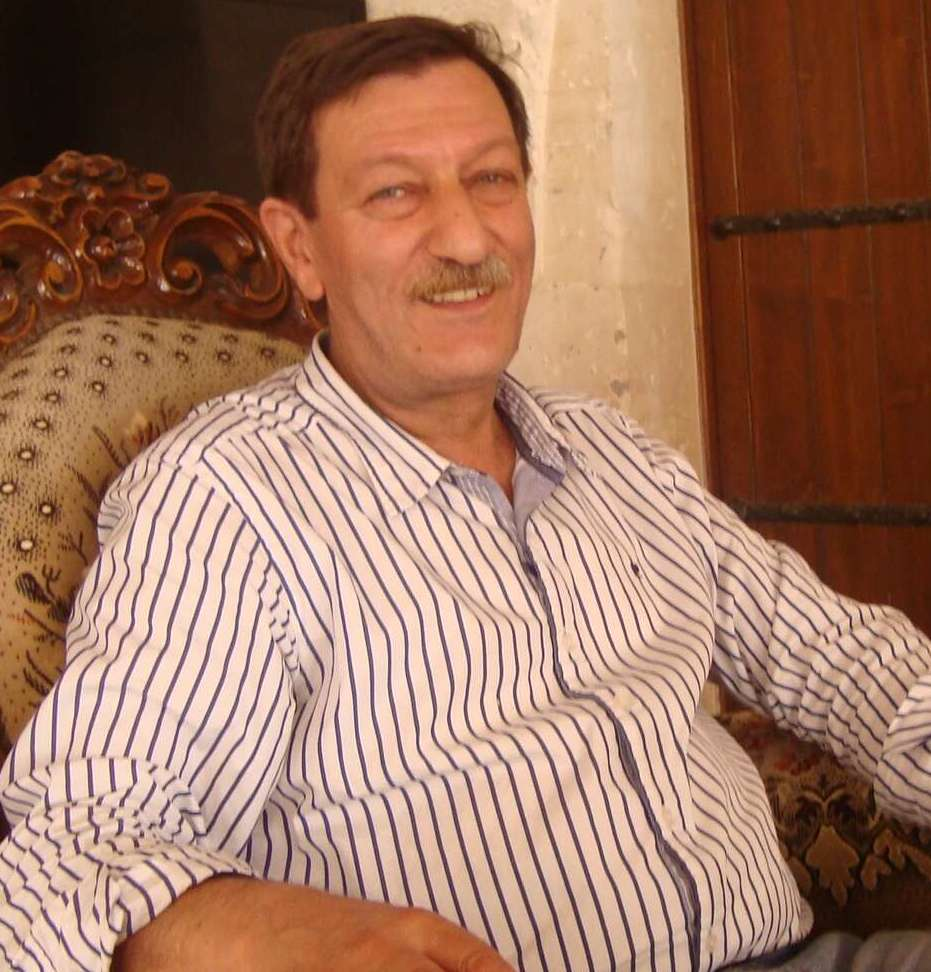
- Têmûrê Xelîl 2013
- Born: Yerevan, Armenian Soviet Socialist Republic

Têmûrê Xelîl (born 1949) is a contemporary Kurdish Yazidi journalist, writer and translator. He is a member of the Kurdish Institute of Paris, editor of the Kurdish journal Roja Nû and lives in Sweden.

== Biography ==
He was born in Yerevan, Armenian Soviet Socialist Republic (Armenian SSR) in family of Yazidi Kurds and after receiving a bachelor's degree in Physics and Mathematics, worked as a math teacher in the Kurdish Yazidi village of Sipan for three years. From 1977 to 1992, he worked as a reporter and later as the head of the cultural section in the Kurdish newspaper Rya Teze. From 1981 to 1984 he also served as the editor of the Kurdish section of Radio Yerevan which was written in the Kurdish dialect of Kurmanji. From 1992 to 1997, he was the deputy of Golos Kurda, a newspaper focused on Kurdish issues published in Russian.

== Translations ==
1. Kurdên Tirkîyê di dema herî nû da (Kurds of Turkey in the Modern Era), translation of M.A. Hasratyan's book, Kurdish Institute of Brussels, 1994.
2. Pirsa Kurdan (1891 - 1917), translation of Курдистан и курдская проблема (Kurdistan and the Kurdish Problem) (1964) by M.S. Lazarev from Russian to Kurdish, Roja Nû Publishers, Stockholm, 1999, 496 p., ISBN 91-7672-049-7
3. Împêrîyalîzm û pirsa Kurdan (1917-1923), translation of Imperializm i Kurdskiy Vopros(Imperialism and the Kurdish Issue (1917–1923))(1989) by M.S. Lazarev from Russian to Kurdish, Roja Nû Publishers, Stockholm, 2002, 388 pp., ISBN 91-7672-058-6

== Books ==
1. Bahar, with Nado Maxmudov, Collection of Kurdish Folklore, Yerevan, 1989, 280 pp., ISBN VF09184

== See also ==
- List of Kurdish scholars
