= Celîlê Celîl =

Kurdish historian, writer and Kurdologist (born 1936)

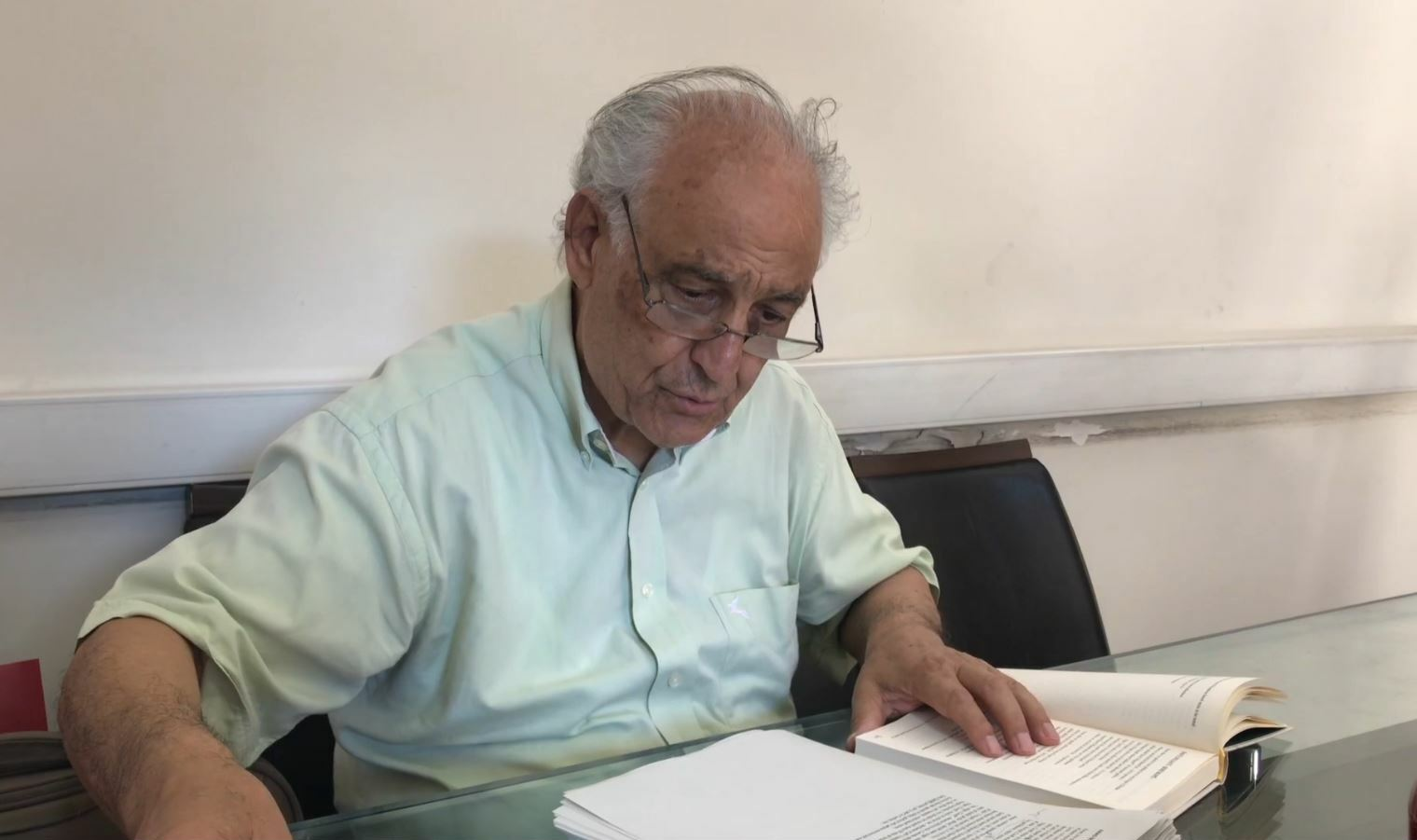
Celîlê Celîl

Celîlê Celîl (born 1936) is a Kurdish historian, writer and Kurdologist. He was born in Yerevan in family of Yazidi Kurds and studied history at the university of Yerevan and Oriental Academy of Leningrad. He wrote his thesis regarding the Kurdish rebellions in the 19th century. He received his PhD in 1963, and worked in the Academy of Sciences from 1963 to 1993. He along with his brother Ordîxanê Celîl, collected Yazidi religious poetry and Kurdish legends and tales. After the collapse of Soviet Union, he moved to Austria, and taught at the University of Vienna, where he taught Kurdish. He is now working at the Academy of Sciences in Vienna.

== Books ==
1. Vosstaniye Kurdov 1880 goda (The uprising of the Kurds in 1880), 132 pp., Nauka Publishers, Moscow, 1966.
2. Zargotina Kurda (Kurdish Folklore), co-authored with Ordîxanê Celîl, Vol. I, II, Nauka Publishers, Moscow, 1978.
3. Jiyana Rewşenbirî û Siyasi ya Kurdan (Intellectual and Political Life of Kurds), 200 pp., Jîna Nû Publishers, 1985.
4. Celîl, O., C. Celîl & Z. Celîl, Kurdskie skazki, legendy i predaniia (Kurdish Fairy Tales and Legends), Nauka Publishers, Moscow, 1989.
5. Zargotina Kurdên Sûriyê (Folklore of Kurds in Syria), co-authored with Ahmet Omer and Ordîxanê Celîl, Jîna Nû Publishers, Uppsala, Sweden, 1989, ISBN 91-970927-3-8.
6. Dastanên Kurdî, coauthored with Ordîxanê Celîl, 244 pp., Zêl Publishers, Istanbul, 1994.
7. Autobîografîya Ebdurrizaq Bedirxan, 72 pp., Havîbûn Publishers, 1999.
8. Dîwaro tera dibêm bûkê tu guhdar be, 158 pp., Pêrî Publishers, Istanbul, 2000.
9. Sîyapûş Seyfulmuluk, 328 pp., Avesta Publishers, 2000.
10. Rûpelên Balkeş Ji Dîroka Gelê Kurd (Important Chapters in the History of Kurdish People), 195 pp., 2002.
11. Keşkûla Kurmancî : sedsalîyên X - XX, 311 pp., Vienna, 2004, ISBN 3-902185-06-6.

== Articles ==
1. Belgek ji pêwendiyên Ermenya Kurda yê dîrokî çandî (A Document on historical and cultural relationship between Kurds and Armenians), Journal of the Oriental Institute of Armenian Academy, p. 105, Vol. XIII, 1985.
