= Tosinê Reşîd =

Kurdish Yazidi writer, poet, and playwright

Tosinê Reşîd at Washington, 2008/Photo :VOA Kurdish

Tosinê Reşîd (also Tosinê Reşît; born 1941) is a contemporary Kurdish Yazidi writer, poet and playwright. He was born in the village of Koorakand (Kûrekend) in Armenia. He studied physics and chemistry at the Pedagogical Institute and graduated in 1964. After a few years of working as a teacher, he continued his studies in 1970 and received his PhD in chemistry in 1975. In the same year, he published his first book entitled Kilamê Rê (Word of the Way). During the 1970s, around 200 of his articles were used under the name of Kurdish Encyclopaedia in cultural programs of Radio Yerevan. He published his first play based on the well known Kurdish folkloric epic Siyabend û Xecê in 1984. In 1993, he left Armenia and settled in Melbourne, Australia.

== Books ==
1. Kilamê rê, Collection of Poems I, 1975.
2. Zozan, Collection of Poems II, 1983.
3. Nîvro, Collection of Poems III, 1987.
4. Siyabend û Xecê, Play, 70 pp., Roja Nû Publishers, 1988. ISBN 91-7672-025-X
5. Şeva bê Xew, Collection of Short Stories, Apec Publishers, Sweden, 2000.
6. In Memory of Qanate Kurdo, with Husên Hebeş, Germany, 2000.
7. Min Bêriya Şevên Spî Kiriye (I Miss the White Nights), Collection of Short Stories, 256 pp., Avesta Publishers, 2005.
