= Sipan, Armenia =

Sipan Սիփան
- Location within Armenia Location within Aragatsotn
- Coordinates: 40°43′18″N 44°16′11″E
- Country: Armenia
- Province: Aragatsotn
- Municipality: Alagyaz

Population (2011)
  - Total: 182
- Time zone: UTC+4 (AMT)

Sipan (Armenian: Սիփան) is a village in the Alagyaz Municipality of the Aragatsotn Province of Armenia.

== Etymology ==
The village was previously known as Tamb (Թամբ), Pamb (Պամբ), Pambak (Պամբակ or Փամբակ), and Pamb Krdi (Փամբ Քրդի). It was renamed Sipan in 1978.

== History ==
During the period of the Russian Empire, the village was part of the Alexandropol Uezd of the Erivan Governorate, and became populated by Yazidi Kurds from the Kars region.

In May 1918, the Ottomans crossed the river of Arpachay (Akhuryan) to wage a brief war against the Yerevan Republic. One column seized the city of Alexandropol and advanced north towards Mount Aragats, where 80 Yazidis got massacred in Pampa Kurda (Sipan).

== Demographics ==
The village is mostly populated by Yazidi Kurds.

Year	Population
1873	292
1897	382
1939	443
1959	350
1979	473
1989	391
2001	264
2011	182

== Notable people ==
- Emerîkê Serdar
