= Ordîxanê Celîl =

Ordîxanê Celîl (Ordikhan Dzhasimovich Dzhalilov or Ordikhan-e Jalil or Ordikhane Dzhalil ) (1932–2007) was a Kurdish scholar. Born in Yerevan to a Kurds–Yazidi family, he entered the philology department of the University of Yerevan in 1951 and graduated in 1956. He was appointed as the Kurdish studies chair of the University of Leningrad in 1957. He worked for three years at the Radio of Yerevan as its first Kurdish anchor. He visited Iraqi Kurdistan in 1958, where he conducted research on the Kurdish language. For many years, he worked on collecting Kurdish folk stories and poetry alongside his brother Jalile Jalil and sister Cemîle Celîl. His archive contains more than 100,000 Kurdish proverbs many of which are still unpublished.

== Books ==
1. Şiyêr û poêm, Poetry, 114 pp., Haip'ethrat Publishers, Armenia, 1959.
2. Stranên Lîrîkên Gelêrîyên Kurd (Kurdish Lyrical and Folkloric Songs), 1964.
3. Курдский героический эпос "Златорукий хан": Дымдым (Dimdim Epic Poetry), 206 pp., Nauka Publishers, 1967.
4. Kurdskie poslovitsy i pogovorki: na kurdskom i russkom iazykakh (Kurdish Proverbs and Sayings, 454 pp., Glavnaia redaktsiia vostochnoi literatury Publishers, Moscow, 1972. (with Celîlê Celîl)
5. Çîrokên Cimaeta Kurda (Tales of Kurdish people), 234 pp., Haiastan Publishers, 1974.
6. Kela Dimdim (Castle of Dimdim).
7. Xanê Dest Zêrîn (Golden hand Khan).
8. Biwêj û Gotinên Pêşiyanên Kurd (Kurdish proverbs).
9. Zargotina Kurda (Kurdish Folklore), co-authored with Celîlê Celîl, Vol. I, II, Nauka Publishers, Moscow, 1978.
10. Celîl, O., C. Celîl & Z. Celîl, Kurdskie skazki, legendy i predaniia (Kurdish Fairy Tales and Legends), Nauka Publishers, Moscow, 1989.
11. Zargotina Kurdên Sûriyê (Folklore of Kurds in Syria), co-authored with Ahmet Omer and Celîlê Celîl, Jîna Nû Publishers, Uppsala, Sweden, 1989, ISBN 91-970927-3-8.
12. Dastanên Kurdî, coauthored with Celîlê Celîl, 244 pp., Zêl Publishers, Istanbul, 1994.
13. Istoricheskie pesni kurdov (Kurdish Folk Songs), 816 pp., Institut vostokovedeniia (Rossiiskaia akademiia), Orientalia Publishers, Saint Petersburg, 2003.
