= Usub Bek Temuryan =

Armenian politician

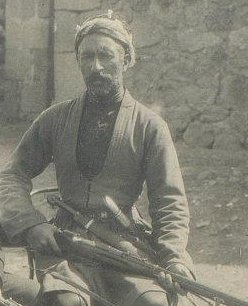
Usub Bek Temuryan

Usub Bek Temuryan (died on January 12, 1934) was a Yezidi Kurd from Armenia and a member of the parliament of the First Republic of Armenia, a major political, national, and a military leader.

== Biography ==
Usub Bek Temuryan was the grandson of Temur Agha.

Since 1896 he had been a leader of the Yazidis of Transcaucasia. Usub Bek also participated in the Battle of Sardarabad in 1918.

In a letter from Usub Bek to the Emperor of Russia from the Romanov dynasty, Usub Bek wrote that his people are Yezidi Kurds. He indicates his ethnicity as Kurdish, but specifies that they are Yezidi by religion:

"I am happy on behalf of 3,000 Families of Yezidi-Kurds, Who 60 years ago, led by my Grandfather Temur Agha, left Turkey and sought refuge in Russia[.] I would like to express my gratitude and wish success to you and your family[.] We live very well on earth and under your rule."

During the period of the First Republic of Armenia, Usub Bek served as a representative of Kurdish communities, including Yazidis, in the first and second Armenian parliaments.

== Legacy ==
In 2007, a school in the village of Shamiram was named in honor of Usub Bek Temuryan. In 2020 a street in Yerevan was named after him.
