= Ria Taza (newspaper) =

Kurdish language newspaper in Armenia

Rya Teze
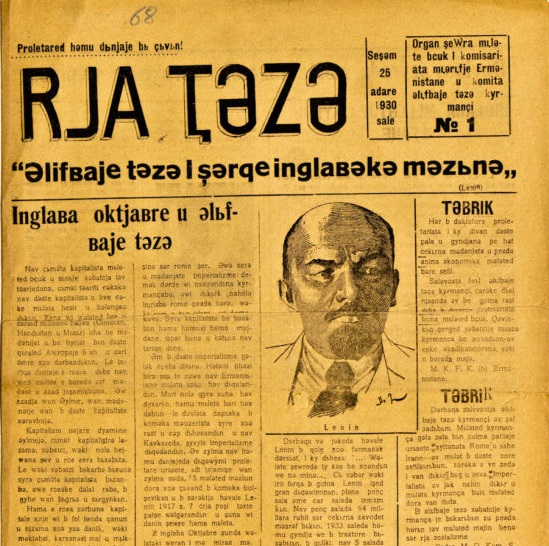
- First issue of Ria Taza
- Founded: 1930
- Ceased publication: 2003
- Language: Kurmanji
- Circulation: 5,000 (as of 1976)

Ria Taza ('New Path', also spelled Rya Teze or Riya Teze) (Note: Written as Rja Ţəzə in the Soviet-era Latin alphabet and Р’йа т'әзә in Cyrillic.) was a Kurdish-language newspaper published in Yerevan, Armenia. The newspaper was founded in March 1930 and the first issue was published on 25 March 1930, printed in Kurmanji Kurdish with the newly designed Latin alphabet of Îsahak Marogûlov and Ereb Şemo. It was the organ of the Kurdish section of the Communist Party of Armenia, and was produced under the auspices of the Central Committee of the Communist Party of Armenia and the Supreme Council and the Council of Ministers of the Armenian SSR. At the time, it was a four-page newspaper, published twice every week and with a circulation of 600 copies. Prior to the Kurdish linguist and author Cerdoyê Genco taking over as editor in 1934, the newspaper was run by three Armenians born in Western Armenia: Kevork Paris, Hrachya Kochar and Harutyun Mkrtchyan, who knew Kurdish. Publication was discontinued in 1937.

In 1955 publication of Ria Taza (in Cyrillic script) was resumed with Miroyi Asad as its editor. As of the early 1970s it was published semiweekly and had a circulation of 2,800. By 1976, circulation had reached 5,000.

In the 1980s, Ria Taza had a weekly circulation of 4,000 and was read by Kurds across the Soviet Union; a smaller number of readers existed among the Kurds in Europe, who sometimes adopted material from it in their own publications published in Germany and Sweden. In 1989 Tital Muradov took over as editor, and in 1991 the editorship was handed over to Emirike Serdar.

Following the disintegration of the Soviet Union the newspaper faced financial difficulties as it no longer received state support. It survived, however. It was converted into a monthly with a circulation of five hundred. In 2000 the script was changed back to Latin alphabet. The newspaper was shut down in 2003 due to economic problems. In total, 4,800 issues of Ria Taza were published between 1930 and 2003.
