= Index of articles related to the Yezidis =

Index of articles about the Yezidis, and their history and culture

Alphabetical index of articles about the Yezidis, and their history and culture.

The Yezidis are a ethnoreligious group, Sub-ethnic group of Kurds found chiefly in Iraqi Kurdistan. Their religion, Yezidism, blends ancient Mesopotamian beliefs with aspects of Islam and Christianity. Throughout history, the Yezidis have experienced numerous persecutions and discrimination, including genocides committed by the Ottoman Empire and the Islamic State group. Due to these events, many Yezidis have been displaced, and the community continues to face many struggles.

Most Yezidis still live in northern Iraq, particularly in the Nineveh Governorate, though there are also smaller communities in other countries such as Armenia, Georgia, Syria, and Turkey. There are also some Yazidi diaspora communities in other nations, such as Sweden, the United Kingdom, Germany, and the United States. These communities have formed due to the repeated violence and persecution that the Yezidis have faced, forcing many to flee their homes and seek refuge elsewhere.

== 0-9 ==
- 1935 Yazidi revolt
- Qahtaniyah bombings
- 2011 Duhok riots
- 2026 Munich Yazidi genocide trial

== A ==
- Abdullah Shrem
- Abovyan
- Ain Sifni
- Aknalich
- Aknashen
- Alagyaz
- Ali Atalan
- Amadin
- Amar Suloev
- Amasia, Armavir
- Amin Farhan Jejo
- Amirkhan Mori
- Apaga, Armenia
- April 2007 Yazidi massacre
- Arab Shamilov
- Aragats, Aragatsotn
- Araks, Armavir
- Araks, Vagharshapat
- Ararat (village), Armenia
- Aratashen
- Arazap
- Arevik
- Arevut
- Arinj
- Armenian–Kurdish relations
- Arshaluys
- Artashar
- Artashat, Armenia
- Artashavan
- Arzni
- Asayîşa Êzîdxanê
- Ashtarak
- Aslan Usoyan
- Avshen
- Aygeshat, Armavir
- Aziz Tamoyan

== B ==
- Baadre
- Babirah
- Baghramyan, Ararat
- Bahçecik, Sur
- Bahzani
- Balaban, Nusaybin
- Balahovit
- Bambakashat
- Bashiqa
- Batel
- Batifa
- Battle of Zakho
- Bazmaghbyur
- Beban
- Berdik
- Berkashat
- Beşpınar, Beşiri
- Borek, Iraq
- Bozan, Iraq
- Bozca
- Burç

== C ==
- Çayırlı, Midyat
- Charchakis
- Çilesiz, Nusaybin
- Claudius Rich

== D ==
- Dalal Khario
- Dalshad Said
- Darkar
- Dayrabun
- Ddmasar
- December 2014 Sinjar offensive
- Değirmencik, Nusaybin
- Delal Bridge
- Deq (tattoo)
- Deveboynu, Beşiri
- Dhu'l-Nun al-Misri
- Dian, Armenia
- Dibek, Nusaybin
- Dinçkök
- Dohula
- Dughata
- Dugure
- Duhok International Airport
- Duhok SC
- Duhok Stadium
- Duhok
- Düzen Tekkal

== E ==
- Emanuel Hana Shaleta
- Emerîkê Serdar
- Emînê Evdal
- Emirate of Kilis
- Erdewan Zaxoyî
- Eskerê Boyîk
- Eyaz Zaxoyî
- Ezdina Mir
- Ezidi Mirza
- Êzîdxan Protection Force
- Êzîdxan Women's Units

== F ==
- Fadhil Barwari
- Farida Khalaf
- Faysh Khabur
- Feast of Ezid
- Feast of the Assembly
- Feleknas Uca
- Ferik, Armenia
- Fexredîn

== G ==
- Gabriel
- Gathering of the spiritual
- Geghakert
- Geghanist, Ararat
- Genocide of Yazidis by the Islamic State
- Getap, Aragatsotn
- Getazat
- Ghazaravan
- Gir Zerk
- Gohbal
- Güneli, Nusaybin
- Guram Adzhoyev (footballer, born 1961)
- Güven, Midyat

== H ==
- Hako, Aragatsotn
- Halamata Cave
- Hardan, Iraq
- Hatsashen
- Haviv Shimoni
- Haydar Shesho
- Hazim Tahsin Beg
- Heciyê Cindî
- Hemoye Shero
- Hesen Begê Cemetery
- History of the Kurds
- Hovtashat
- Human rights in Islamic State-controlled territory

== I ==
- Ibrahim Khalil (singer)
- İkiköprü, Beşiri
- Imad Youkhana Yaqo
- Islamic State
- İsmail Özden
- It's On U

== J ==
- Jamshlu
- Janan Sawa
- Jangir Agha
- Jassim Mohammed Haji
- Jraber
- Jrarat, Armavir
- Jrarat, Kotayk
- Jrvezh

== K ==
- Kaleli, Nusaybin
- Kanakeravan
- Kanch
- Kaniashir
- Kassem Taher Saleh
- Khabur (Tigris)
- Khalid Mushir
- Khalil Rashow
- Khana Sor
- Khanke
- Khanna Omarkhali
- Khatarah
- Khatuna Fekhra
- Khdr Hajoyan
- Khoshaba
- Khurto Hajji Ismail
- Kızılin, Nizip
- Kocadağ, Nusaybin
- Kocho, Iraq
- Kovan Abdulraheem
- Kseniya Borodina
- Kumgeçit, Beşiri
- Kurdistan List
- Kurukavak, Beşiri
- Kuşçukuru, Beşiri
- Kyaram Sloyan

== L ==
- Lalish
- Lamiya Haji Bashar
- Lernamerdz
- List of Yazidi holy figures
- List of Yazidi holy places
- List of Yazidi organizations
- List of Yazidi people
- List of Yazidi settlements
- Louis Raphaël I Sako
- Lukashin
- Lusakn

== M ==
- Mağaraköy, İdil
- Mahad, Iraq
- Mahmoud Ezidi
- Mam Rashan Shrine
- Mam Rashan
- Mamuka Usubyan
- Margara
- Masis, Armenia
- Mayakovski, Armenia
- Mela Huseynê Bateyî
- Metsadzor
- Meyan Khatun
- Mijnatun
- Mikhail Aloyan
- Mirak, Armenia
- Mirza Dinnayi
- Mkhchyan
- Mrganush
- Murder of Du'a Khalil Aswad
- Musa Sor
- Myasnikyan

== N ==
- Nadia Murad
- Nagham Nawzat
- Nalbandyan, Armenia
- Nareen Shammo
- Narsai Toma
- Nasirdîn
- Nimrud Baito
- Nineveh Governorate
- Nineveh Plains
- Nor Artagers
- Nor Geghi
- Nor Gyugh
- Noramarg
- Norashen, Ararat
- November 2015 Sinjar offensive

== O ==
- Oğlakçı
- Oğuz, Beşiri
- Order of the Peacock Angel
- Ordîxanê Celîl
- Oshakan
- Otevan
- Oyuklu, Midyat

== P ==
- Pascal Esho Warda
- Persecution of Yazidis by Kurds
- Persecution of Yazidis
- Pir Ali (Yazidi saint)
- Pir Mehmed Reshan
- Pîr Xidir Silêman
- Principality of Mahmudi
- Proshyan
- Pshatavan

== Q ==
- Qatma
- Qibar
- Qiniyeh
- Quba Mêrê Dîwanê

== R ==
- Rabia of Basra
- Ramzi Garmou
- Ranchpar
- Ravi Singh (humanitarian)
- Rewan Amin
- Ridwan (place)
- Roman Amoyan
- Rya Taza

== S ==
- Sabunchi
- Sadunts
- Saghmosavan
- Saleh Yousefi
- Salih Jaber
- Samand Siabandov
- Seven Archangels
- Shahumyan, Armavir
- Shamiram, Armenia
- Sharaf ad-Din ibn al-Hasan
- Sharanish
- Sharfadin Temple
- Sharya, Iraq
- Shehid ibn Jerr
- Sheikh Adi ibn Musafir
- Sheikh Ali Ilyas
- Sheikh Hasan ibn Sheikh Adi II
- Sheikh Khairy Khedr
- Sheikh Mand
- Sheikh Obekr
- Sheikh Shems
- Shenavan, Aragatsotn
- Shenik, Armavir
- Shenkani
- Shir Sarim
- Shirin Hassani Ramazan
- Siba Sheikh Khidir
- Sicadîn
- Silat Bridge
- Simele District
- Simele massacre
- Simele
- Sinjar Alliance
- Sinjar massacre
- Sinjar Mountains
- Sinjar Resistance Units
- Sinjar
- Sinun
- Sipan, Armenia
- Slavery in 21st-century jihadism
- Soran Emirate
- Sorik
- Souzan Barakat
- Sreshka
- Sultan Ezid Temple
- Sultan Ezid

== T ==
- Tahseen Said
- Tal Banat
- Tal Qasab
- Talin, Armenia
- Tandzut, Armavir
- Tatul Avoyan
- Tatul, Armenia
- Tawûsgeran
- Tawûsî Melek
- Tepeyolu
- The Last Girl (memoir)
- The Liberation of Christian and Yazidi Children of Iraq
- Til Ezer
- Tiwaf
- Tlik
- Tosinê Reşîd
- Turkish airstrikes on Sinjar (2018)
- Turkish airstrikes on Sinjar (2021)
- Tutak, Turkey

== U ==
- Üçgül
- Üçkuyular, Beşiri
- Uğurca, Beşiri
- University of Zakho
- Usuv Beg

== V ==
- Verin Artashat
- Verin Kalakut
- Vian Dakhil
- Vîn TV

== W ==
- Walid Yunis Ahmad
- Wansa

== X ==
- None

== Y ==
- Yazda
- Yazidi Academy
- Yazidi Black Book
- Yazidi Book of Revelation
- Yazidi genocide by the Soran Emirate (1832–1834)
- Yazidi House
- Yazidi literature
- Yazidi Movement for Reform and Progress
- Yazidi New Year
- Yazidi social organization
- Yazidis in Armenia
- Yazidis in Georgia
- Yazidis in Germany
- Yazidis in Syria
- Yazidis
- Yazidism in Iraq
- Yazidism in Russia
- Yazidism in Turkey
- Yazidism
- Yeghegnut, Armavir
- Yemişli, Midyat
- Yenice, Midyat
- Yeraskhahun
- Yezidi National Union ULE
- Yolkonak, Beşiri
- Yolveren, Batman
- Yona Sabar

== Z ==
- Zakhariy Kalashov
- Zakho District
- Zakho SC
- Zakho
- Zana Allée
- Zar, Armenia
- Zara (Russian singer)
- Zartonk
- Zembîlfiroş
- Zeravani SC
- Zorava
- Zovuni

== Categories related to Yezidis ==
- Category:Armenian Yazidis
- Category:Duhok
- Category:Fiction about Yezidis
- Category:German Yazidis
- Category:Iraqi Yazidis
- Category:Mass media in Duhok
- Category:People from Duhok
- Category:People from Zakho
- Category:Persecution of Yazidis by Muslims
- Category:Persecution of Yazidis by the Islamic State
- Category:Persecution of Yazidis in Iraq
- Category:Persecution of Yazidis
- Category:Russian Yazidis
- Category:Simele
- Category:Sinjar Alliance
- Category:Syrian Yazidis
- Category:Turkish Yazidis
- Category:Yazidi communities
- Category:Yazidi communities in Armenia
- Category:Yazidi communities in Iraq
- Category:Yazidi communities in Syria
- Category:Yazidi communities in Turkey
- Category:Yezidi culture
- Category:Yazidi diaspora
- Category:Yezidi history
- Category:Yezidi holy days
- Category:Yezidi holy figures
- Category:Yezidi holy places
- Category:Yezidi mythology
- Category:Yazidi organizations by country
- Category:Yazidi organizations in Iraq
- Category:Yazidi organizations
- Category:Yazidi people by country
- Category:Yezidi people
- Category:Yezidi places
- Category:Yazidi princesses
- Category:Yezidi society
- Category:Yazidi stub templates
- Category:Yazidi stubs
- Category:Yezidi templates
- Category:Yezidi texts
- Category:Yazidi traditions
- Category:Yazidi women
- Category:Yezidis by country
- Category:Yazidis from Georgia (country)
- Category:Yazidis in Armenia
- Category:Yazidis in Georgia (country)
- Category:Yazidis in Germany
- Category:Yazidis in Iraq
- Category:Yazidis in Russia
- Category:Yazidis in Syria
- Category:Yazidis in Turkey
- Category:Yezidism
- Category:Zakho

== Yazidi templates ==
- Template:Yazidi diaspora
- Template:Yazidi-stub
