= Tiwaf =

Yazidi festival

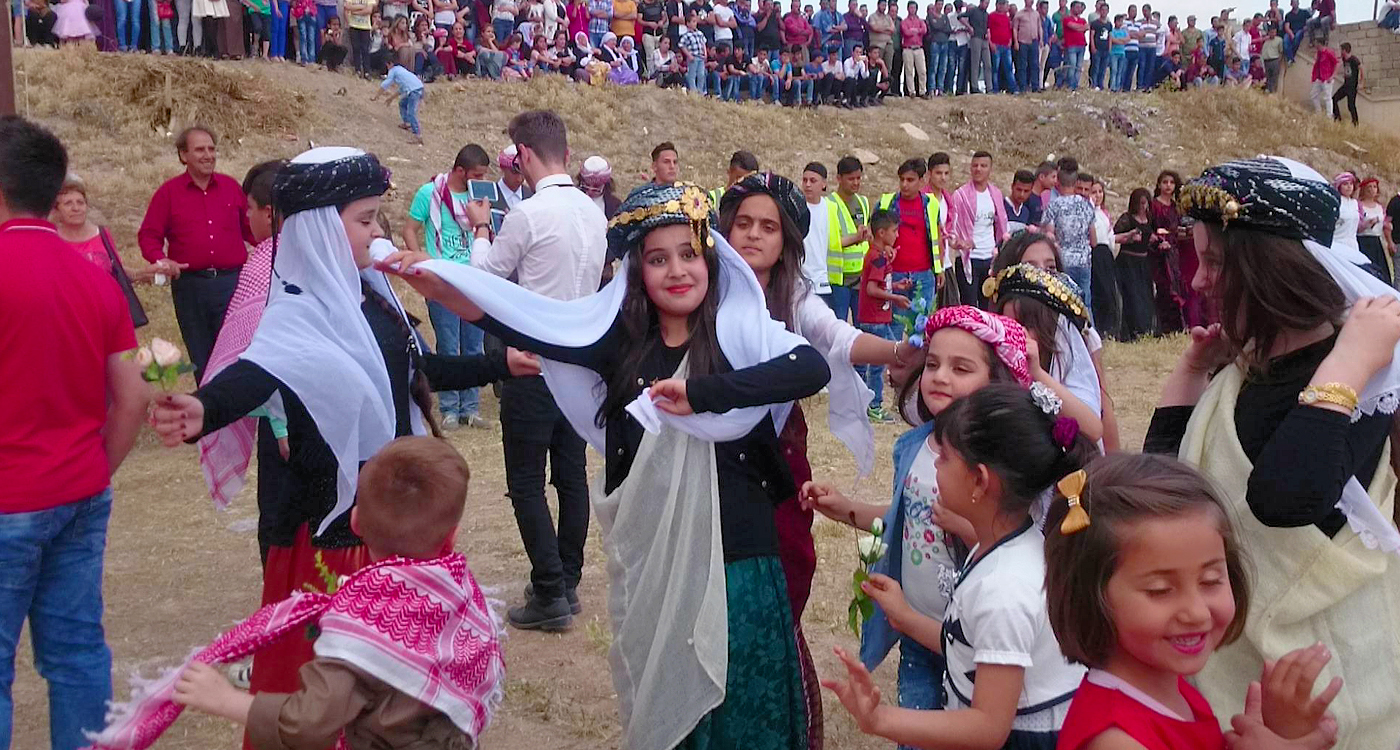
- Tiwaf (Tawwaf) in Bashiqa, Iraq
- Observed by: Yazidis
- Type: Religious

A tiwaf is a type of religious festival in Yazidism.

== Overview ==
Tiwafs are accompanied by numerous rituals which vary from shrine to shrine. These rituals may include performances of the qewwals with their musical instruments, changing and renewing of the coloured strips of cloth (perî) that hang from the spire of the shrine, ritual meals either for the heads of the households or for the whole village, or cooked parts of the sacrificial sheep being auctioned off to bidders among the cheering crowd. The tiwafs in other places also include trips into nature to reach a sacred spot, lending an air of picnic to the occasion, one example is during the tiwaf at the shrine of Kerecal near Sharya, which takes place on a mountain, or at the sacred place of Sexrê Cinê located deep inside the Valley of Jinn near Bozan. In many places, large and communal dances are also included in the tiwafs. Tiwafs are not necessarily attended solely by the locals of the village itself, the participants may also include many of the other Yazidis, particularly the ones who have relatives in the village or have a special attachment with the holy being to which the shrine is dedicated. Together with keeping the Yazidi religious customs alive, tiwafs also serve to strengthen the social ties between families and the communal solidarity, both on the village and inter-village levels.

== History and timing ==
Tiwafs are annual, local, and communal religious festivals mostly celebrated in spring. They generally begin on the first Friday after the Yazidi New Year in April, according to the Eastern calendar, and continue for about a month and a half, though some tiwafs are held during other seasons. According to tradition and elders, tiwafs date back to before the era of Sheikh Adi and are historically linked to the Sersal (the Feast of the Yazidi New Year) history. Yazidis from the Shingal area have similar rituals and ceremonies of the tiwaf called Cema(yê Şingalê), which take place mostly in the summer and autumn seasons.

== Additional practices ==
- Çirahilkirin (Lighting Lamps): On the night before a tiwaf is performed, custodians have a religious obligation to light lamps in religious places, symbolizing the sun and light as a prerequisite for the continuity of life.
- Baptising Perîs: Before changing the perî, the custodian (micêwir) blesses ("baptises") the new strips of cloth with the water of the White Spring (Kanîya Sipî) in Lalish. This act, along with renewing the perî, indicates the renewal of nature and the coming of spring.
