= Bulaglı =

Bulaglı may refer to:

- Bulaqlı, a village and municipality in the Sabirabad Rayon of Azerbaijan.
- Bulagli, a town in the Ararat Province of Armenia.
