= Red Wednesday =

Red Wednesday may refer to:

- the Yezidi New Year
- a fire festival marking the beginning of Persian New Year celebrations, also translated as Scarlet Wednesday
- a Wednesday in November when certain Christian churches call attention to various international persecutions of Christian-believers in other countries
