= List of terrorist incidents in 1995 =

This is a timeline of incidents in 1995 that have been labelled as "terrorism" and are not believed to have been carried out by a government or its forces (see state terrorism and state-sponsored terrorism).

== Guidelines ==
- To be included, entries must be notable (have a stand-alone article) and described by a consensus of reliable sources as "terrorism".
- List entries must comply with the guidelines outlined in the manual of style under MOS:TERRORIST.
- Casualties figures in this list are the total casualties of the incident including immediate casualties and later casualties (such as people who succumbed to their wounds long after the attacks occurred).
- Casualties listed are the victims. Perpetrator casualties are listed separately (e.g. x (+y) indicate that x victims and y perpetrators were killed/injured).
- Casualty totals may be underestimated or unavailable due to a lack of information. A figure with a plus (+) sign indicates that at least that many people have died (e.g. 10+ indicates that at least 10 people have died) – the actual toll could be considerably higher. A figure with a plus (+) sign may also indicate that over that number of people are victims.
- If casualty figures are 20 or more, they will be shown in **bold**. In addition, figures for casualties more than 50 will also be **underlined**.
- Incidents are limited to one per location per day. If multiple attacks occur in the same place on the same day, they will be merged into a single incident.
- In addition to the guidelines above, the table also includes the following categories:

0 people were killed/injured by the incident.
1–19 people were killed/injured by the incident.
20–49 people were killed/injured by the incident.
50–99 people were killed/injured by the incident.
100+ people were killed/injured by the incident.

== List ==
Date	Type	Dead	Injured	Location	Details	Perpetrators	Part of
January 30	Car bombing	42	286	Algiers, Algeria	January 1995 Algiers bombing: A car bomb exploded near police headquarters, killing 42 and injuring another 286.	GIA	Algerian Civil War
February 27	Car bombing	76	123	Zakho, Iraq	1995 Zakho bombing: A car bomb exploded in a crowded marketplace, killing 77 and injuring 123 others. No one claimed responsibility but the Patriotic Union of Kurdistan was blamed.	PUK	Iraqi Kurdish Civil War
March 20	Gassing	13	1,050+	Tokyo, Japan	Tokyo subway sarin attack: Members of Aum Shinrikyo released sarin gas onto five trains of the Tokyo subway	Aum Shinrikyo	
April 19	Truck bombing	168	680+	Oklahoma City, U.S.	The Oklahoma City bombing was a domestic terrorist bomb attack on the Alfred P. Murrah Federal Building. Carried out by Timothy McVeigh and Terry Nichols, the bombing killed 168 people and injured more than 680 others in retaliation for the U.S. federal government's handling of the Ruby Ridge and Waco sieges. The blast destroyed or damaged 324 buildings within a 16-block radius, destroyed or burned 86 cars, and shattered glass in 258 nearby buildings, causing at least an estimated $652 million worth of damage.	Timothy McVeigh and Terry Nichols	
April 20	Massacre	c. 300	unknown	Atiak, Uganda	Atiak massacre	Lord's Resistance Army	Lord's Resistance Army insurgency
April 24	Mail bombing	1	0	Sacramento, California	A mail bomb opened by (then) President of the California Forestry Association, Gilbert Brent Murray, exploded, killing him instantly. The mail bomb was sent by Ted Kaczynski (the Unabomber).	Theodore John Kaczynski (Unabomber)	Ted Kaczynski's 1978 to 1995 mail bombing campaign
April 28	Shootdown	45	0	Jaffna, Sri Lanka	1995 Sri Lanka Air Force Avro 748 (CR835) shootdown: LTTE militants shot down a Sri Lankan Air Force plane with a missile shortly after the plane left Jaffna Airport.	LTTE	Sri Lankan Civil War
April 29	Shootdown	52	0	Jaffna, Sri Lanka	1995 Sri Lanka Air Force Avro 748 (CR834) shootdown: LTTE militants shot down a Sri Lankan Air Force plane that was sent to investigate the previous day's shootdown.	LTTE	Sri Lankan Civil War
May 25	Massacre	42		Kallarawa, Sri Lanka	Kallarawa massacre: LTTE cadres attacked a fishing village, where they hacked and shot to death 42 civilians.	LTTE	Sri Lankan Civil War
June 14–19	Siege	129-166 (+11)	400+	Budyonnovsk, Russia	Budyonnovsk hospital hostage crisis: Dozens of Chechen rebels led by Shamil Basayev attacked the town before taking around 1,500-2,000 hostages at a hospital. After several days of failed negotiations, Russian police stormed the hospital and engaged in heavy gunfire with the militants. Estimates of the number of people killed range from 129 to 166.	CRI	First Chechen War
June 17	Arson	0	0	West Perth, Australia	1995 bombing of the French Consulate in Perth, Western Australia: The French consulate building was firebombed by two eco-terrorists who opposed French nuclear weapons testing .	Bosco Boscovich; Maya Catts	
July 4	Kidnapping	6	0	Pahalgam, India	1995 Kidnapping of western tourists in Kashmir: Six western tourists (two British, two American, one German and one Norwegian) were kidnapped and held for ransom by Islamic radicals and murdered over the following several months.	Al-Faran	Insurgency in Jammu and Kashmir
July 24	Suicide bombing	6 (+1 perpetrator)	30	Tel Aviv, Israel	Ramat Gan bus bombing: A Palestinian suicide bomber detonated on a bus, killing 6 and injuring 30.	Hamas	Israeli–Palestinian conflict
July 25	Bombing	8	80	Paris, France	1995 France bombings: A gas bottle exploded at a train station	GIA	Algerian Civil War
August 17	Bombing	0	17	Paris, France	1995 France bombings: Bombing at the Arc de Triomphe	GIA	Algerian Civil War
August 21	Suicide bombing	5 (+1 perpetrator)	100	Jerusalem, Israel	Ramat Eshkol bus bombing: A Hamas suicide bomber detonated on a bus, killing 5 and injuring 100.	Hamas	Israeli–Palestinian conflict
August 26	Attempted bombing	0	0	Lyon, France	1995 France bombings: Large bomb found and defused near railway tracks.	GIA	Algerian Civil War
August 28	Mortar	43	75	Sarajevo, Bosnia and Herzegovina	Markale massacres#Second massacre: The Army of Republika Srpska launched a mortar targeting Bosniak civilians at a market, similar to an attack they launched the previous year.	VRS	Bosnian War
September 3	Bombing	0	4	Paris, France	1995 France bombings: Bombing at a square	GIA	Algerian Civil War
September 7	Car bombing	0	14	Lyon, France	1995 France bombings: A car bomb exploded outside a Jewish school in Lyon, wounding 14 people.	GIA	Algerian Civil War
October	Massacres	~120		Eastern Province, Sri Lanka	October 1995 Eastern Sri Lanka massacres: The LTTE carried out several massacres of Sinhalese civilians	LTTE	Sri Lankan Civil War
October 6	Bombing	0	13	Paris, France	1995 France bombings: Bombing at a Paris Métro station	GIA	Algerian Civil War
October 9	Sabotage	1	78	Arizona, United States	1995 Palo Verde, Arizona derailment: Amtrak's Sunset Limited train was intentionally derailed by unknown perpetrators. Four typed notes criticizing the FBI and ATF for their handling of the Waco siege were found near the scene and signed with "Sons of the Gestapo". However no group called the "Sons of the Gestapo" has ever been uncovered.	Unknown	
October 18	Bombing	0	29	Paris, France	1995 France bombings: A bomb was thrown at an underground commuter train. The train was derailed and damaged. No one was killed, but 29 people were injured.	GIA	Algerian Civil War
October 20	Suicide car bombing	0 (+1)	29	Rijeka, Croatia	1995 Rijeka bombing: A car bomb was detonated in front of a police station. The perpetrator driving the car was the sole fatality. Responsibility was claimed by al-Gama'a al-Islamiyya.	al-Gama'a al-Islamiyya	Bosnian War
November 4	Assassination	1	1	Tel Aviv, Israel	Assassination of Yitzhak Rabin: Prime Minister Yitzhak Rabin was assassinated and his bodyguard wounded by ultranationalist Yigal Amir, who opposed Rabin's signing of the Oslo Accords.	Yigal Amir	Israeli–Palestinian conflict
November 19	Car bombing	17	≈60	Islamabad, Pakistan	Attack on the Egyptian Embassy in Pakistan: Bombing of the Egyptian Embassy killed 17.	Egyptian Islamic Jihad	
December 11	Car bombing	6	19	Madrid, Spain	1995 Vallecas bombing: Basque separatists bombed an army vehicle carrying civilian employees.	ETA	Basque conflict
December 22	Car bombing	32+	117	Peshawar, Pakistan	1995 Peshawar bombing: A car bomb exploded outside a department store, killing at least 32 and injuring 117 more.	Unknown	

== See also ==
- List of terrorist incidents
