= Nikolayevka, Armenia =

Nikolayevka, Armenia may refer to:

- Amrakits, formerly Nikolayevka
- Jraber, formerly Nikolayevka
