= Kenaker =

Kenaker may refer to:

- Kanakerr, Armenia
- Kanakerravan, Armenia
