= Chiya Hamid Sharif =

Member of the Kurdistan Parliament

Chiya Hamid Sharif جيا حميد شريف

Personal details
- Born: September 15, 1975 (age 50)
- Party: Kurdistan Democratic Party
- Website: Chiya Hamid Sharif

Chiya Hamid Sharif (known as Chiya Sharif) (born September 15, 1975) is a Kurdish politician and member of the Kurdistan Democratic Party (KDP).

Sharif was born in the Zakho region of Dohuk Governorate. As of 2026 he is a member of the Kurdistan Parliament. " Chiya Sharif " is a member of the Kurdistan Community and Relations Committee, and vice-chairman of the Parliamentary Affairs Committee in the Kurdistan Parliament. " Chiya Sharif " is fluent in Kurdish, Persian, Dutch, English, Arabic and Turkish.

== Academic achievement ==
- Bachelor; Albeda University, Health (1997 - 2002).
- Master's; Health Administration (2002 - 2003).
- Kurdistan Democratic Party Academy (2012).

== Political and positions ==
- Translator of Kurdish, Persian and Dutch languages for refugees (1998 - 2004).
- Member of the Eighth Branch of the Organization Office of the Kurdistan Democratic Party (2005 - 2009).
- Head of Cardiothoracic Surgery Department (2000 - 2004).
- Member of the Kurdish Cultural Association Committee (1994 - 2004).
- Member of the working body in the eighth branch, responsible for the elections office, from 2012 until now.
- Member of the Eighth Branch of the Office of Public and Professional Organizations (2009 - 2012).

== See also ==
- Kurdistan Parliament
