= January 1995 Algiers bombing =

Terrorist incident in Algeria

- Part of Algerian Civil War
- Location: Algiers, Algeria
- Date: 30 January 1995
- Deaths: 42
- Injuries: 250+
- Perpetrator: Armed Islamic Group

The January 1995 Algiers bombing occurred at 3:20pm on 30 January 1995, a bomb exploded on a busy street in central Algiers, Algeria. It was a suicide car bombing which used over 220 lb (100 kg) of explosives. It was detonated in front of a bank office, across the street from Algiers' police headquarters and near to the city's main post office and train station. It killed 42 people and injured over 250 others. The bombing was perpetrated by the Armed Islamic Group of Algeria (GIA) and occurred during the Algerian Civil War. Algiers was also bombed on 26 August 1992, and in 2007 on 11 April and 11 December.

== See also ==
- List of terrorist incidents in 1995
