= Yazidi Academy =

Organization based in Honover, Germany

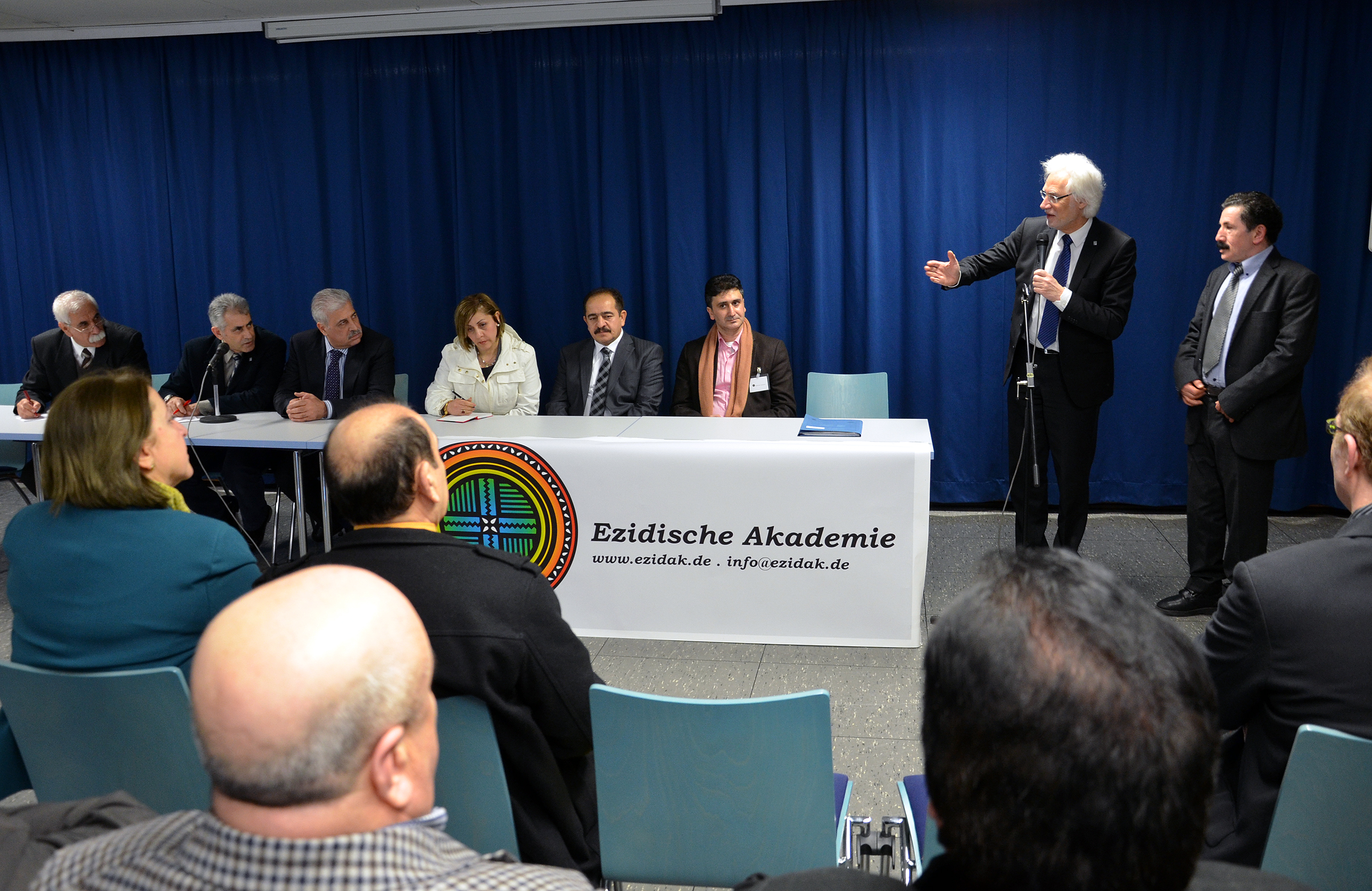
Hannover's mayor Bernd Strauch welcoming Atheel al-Nujaifi, governor of Nineveh, at the Ezidische Akademie in 2014

The Yazidi Academy (German: Jesidische Akademie) is a non-profit organisation and learned society based in Hanover, Germany.

The organisation was founded in 2009, it concerns itself with the historical and current situation of the Yazidis. Since then, it has also published the German-language magazine Zeitschrift der Ezidischen Akademie. Forum für Diskussionsbeiträge zum Ezidentum. It also hosts the Yazidi Library that had been established in 2007.

The Yazidi Academy is a member of the network of migrants initiatives MiSO. It offers literacy and German courses as well as legal counselling for asylum seekers.

== See also ==
- Yezidi National Union ULE
- Yazidis in Germany
- Nineveh Plain
- List of Yazidi organizations
