= 1995 Zakho bombing =

Car bombing in Iraq

At 8:18am on 27 February 1995, a car bomb exploded in Zakho, a city which is 12 miles from the Turkish border in Dohuk Governorate, Kurdistan Region, Iraq. It happened during the Iraqi Kurdish Civil War, which began nine months earlier. The bomb was made from 330 pounds of dynamite and exploded whilst the car (a taxi) was outside a tea shop which was located in a busy marketplace. A hundred people were killed and 150 injured.

== See also ==
- List of terrorist incidents, 1995
- Terrorism in Iraq
- Zakho resort attack
