= Khdr Hajoyan =

President of the National Union of Yezidis

Khdr Hajoyan (Armenian: Խդր Հաջոյան, born December 4, 1990), is the President of the National Union of Yezidis and the Director of Yezdikhana, the official newspaper of the Yezidi National Union.

== Early years ==
In 2007 he graduated from Zovuni village Secondary School, named by R. Baghdasaryan admitted to the Faculty of Law of Yerevan State University in the same year. Since 2008 he has been active in public life, participating in several local and international programs and festivals, presenting the Yezidi culture, religion, language, history, and national traditions.

From May 12, 2010, to 2021, became the Editor-in-Chief of "Ezdikhana" newspaper. On June 28, 2011, he assumed the position of First Deputy Chairman of the National Union of Yezidis. In 2013 Graduated from Yerevan State University, Faculty of Law. In 2015 he graduated from the Faculty of Archeology with a master's degree in the same university.

He participated in various international programs related to legal and social development, cooperation, and intercultural dialogue. In his spare time, he composes, writes lyrics and music for several well-known Yezidi songs. He is one of the co-founders of the Yezidi IP TV channel "Ezidkhan" and the head of its Armenian branch. Together with the leader Aziz Tamoyan and Hasan Tamoyan Khdr Hajoyan is the co-author of five and 11th-grade textbooks, like "Yezidi Language and Literature".

Khdr Hajoyan is Aziz Tamoyan's grandson. He was his grandson and his right hand.

== Social-political activity ==
Since August 3, 2014, he has been actively involved in preventing violence against the Yezidis in Iraq, recognizing and condemning the Yezidi genocide. In this regard, he visited many European countries, strengthened and established contacts with several local Yezidi organizations and public figures, as well as with a Yezidi delegation in India, met with the Minister of Foreign Affairs of India and some interested leaders to support Yezidi-refugees.

He established contacts with Yezidi organizations in Iraq, European countries, the Russian Federation, the USA, Canada, and Georgia.

"A man who has devoted his whole life to preserving the identity of the Yezidi people, strengthening the Armenian-Yezidi friendship." It was about this that a documentary film dedicated to Aziz Tamoyan took place, which preceded the election of a new president, and took place on February 22, 2021, during the congress of the National Union of Yezidis, held at the Moskva cinema in the capital of Armenia, Yerevan. During the congress, video messages from leaders of Yezidi international organizations who were unable to attend the congress were shown on the screen.

Particular messages were sent by the spiritual leader of the Yezidis, Emir of Shangala Mir Naif bin Daud, the head of the Yezidi community of Canada Mirza Ismail, the commander of the Yezidi military detachment from Iraq Ali Isa (Hal Ali), the deputy chairman of the Progressive Yezidi Party in Iraq Amar Kton. The screen also showed video messages from the leaders of the Yezidi structures in Germany, Sweden, France, and Russia. The National Union of Yezidis Rostam Shamoyan, Surik Hajoyan, Ayser Isayan, the caring leader of the Yezidis of Armenia Bro Hasanyan, Hamlet Hajoyan spoke before the congress. Prosperous Armenia MP Arman Abovyan, ARF Dashnaktsutyun representative Artsvik Minasyan, Head of the Department of Religious Affairs and National Minorities under the RA Government Vardan Asatryan and Professor Garnik Asatryan also gave a speech.

During his speech at the congress, Khdr Hajoyan (Tamoyan) noted that the priceless legacy left by his great teacher Aziz Tamoyan testifies to his eternal presence. According to the National Union of Yezidis, Khdr Hajoyan (Tamoyan) considers the elections not a personal choice but the preservation and development of the rights, religion, language, national values, culture, and education of the Yezidis. as strengthening the centuries-old Armenian-Yezidi friendship. "Be sure that all the problems facing our people are solvable, and the difficulties, of course, can be overcome only through our unity, our joint forces.

The path that we have to go is not easy, but your patriotism and commitment to preserving national values make me strong so that I can continue with even greater energy the sacred work that we inherited from the happy memory of Aziz Tamoyan and his supporters. So let us unite and stand up for our rights. “Bji Ezidihan, Doctor Armenia, Doctor Tsfaka Yezidia and Armenia, Hall, Hall, Khola Sultan Ezide Sor (Long live Yezidihan, long live Armenia, long live Armenian-Yezidi unity),” the Union said.
