= Andraos Abouna =

Chaldean bishop

- Bishop of Hirta
- Andraos Abouna
- Church: Chaldean Catholic Church
- Diocese: Chaldean Catholic Patriarchate of Babylon
- Elected: 6 November 2002
- In office: 6 January 2003 – 27 July 2010

Orders
- Ordination: 5 June 1960
- Consecration: 6 January 2003

Personal details
- Born: March 23, 1943 Bedare, Zakho, Iraq
- Died: July 27, 2010 (aged 67)
- Denomination: Chaldean Catholic Church
- Occupation: Bishop
- Education: St. Peter seminary

Andraos Abouna (23 March 1943 – 27 July 2010) was the Chaldean Catholic titular bishop of Hirta and the auxiliary bishop of the Chaldean Catholic Patriarchate of Babylon. He was an ethnic Assyrian.

== Biography ==
Abouna was born in 1943 in Bedare, Zakho, Iraq. At the age of 14, he left home to go to St. Peter seminary. He was then ordained to the priesthood on 5 June 1960. In 1961 he was appointed parish priest for the diocese of Basra. After the Six-Day War, he played a role in dialogue among muslims and christians in southern Iraq. He was named bishop on 6 November 2002 and was ordained on 6 January 2003.
