= Yezidis in Germany =

Minority group in Germany

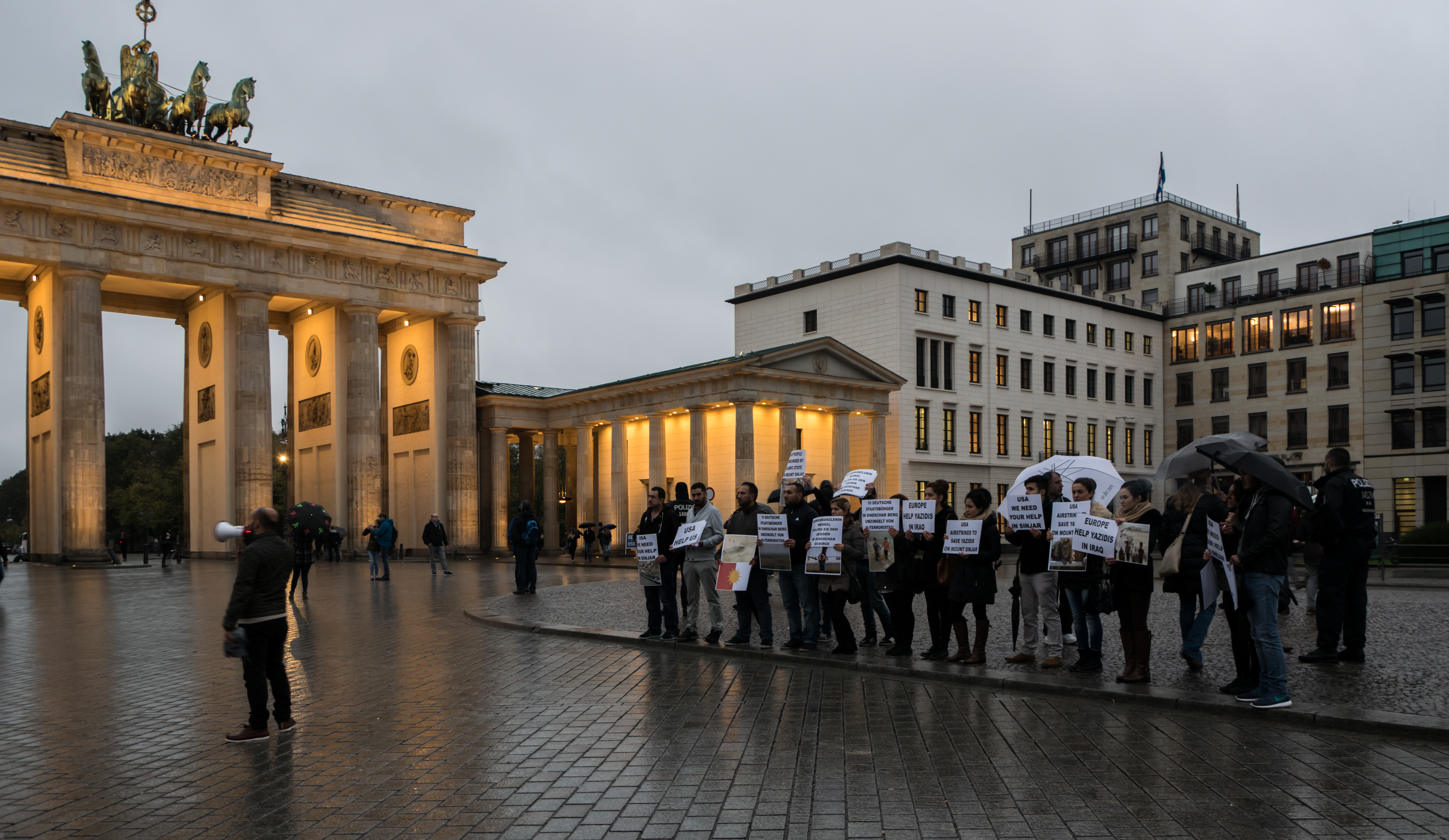
- Yazidi demonstration in front of the Brandenburg Gate and the Embassy of the United States in Berlin, Germany.

Total population
- from 60,000 to 100,000–120,000

Religion
- Yazidism (Sharfadin)

Yazidis in Germany may refer to people born in or residing in Germany of Yazidi origin, an ethnic group or Kurdish group who are strictly endogamous.

There is a large Yazidi community in Germany, estimated to be numbering around 60,000 - 120,000 people. This makes the German Yazidi community one of the largest in the Yazidi diaspora.

== Immigration history ==
Many Yazidis fled to Germany during the 1990s fearing religious persecution in Turkey. The Yazidi population of Germany was around 20,000 in 1998. Many Yazidi intellectuals also fled during this time and now play a prominent role in Yazidi diaspora affairs and maintain connections with Yazidis in Iraq.

== Political activism ==
In August 2014, German Yazidis held protests against the Islamic State and called for an immediate end of the Genocide of Yazidis by ISIL. Between 5,000 and 10,000 people attended the demonstrations. Three commanders of the Yazidi militias who fought against the Islamic State of Iraq and the Levant (ISIL) in Iraq have lived for various years in Germany.

== Yazidis in Germany ==
- Ali Atalan – politician
- Eskerê Boyîk – writer
- Khalil Rashow – academic
- Feleknas Uca – politician
- Nadia Murad – human rights activist and Nobel Peace Prize laureate
- Khanna Omarkhali - academic

== See also ==
- Yazidi Academy
- List of Yazidi organizations
