= Shirin Hassani Ramazan =

Iraqi politician

Shirin Hassani Ramazan (Kurdish: شیرین حسنی ره‌مه‌زان, born 1980) is an Iraqi Kurdish politician of the Kurdistan Democratic Party (KDP). She was born in Zakho.
