= Lukashin =

Village in Armavir, Armenia

Lukashin Լուկաշին
- Location within Armenia
- Coordinates: 40°10′33″N 44°01′07″E
- Country: Armenia
- Province: Armavir

Population (2011)
  - Total: 2,216
- Time zone: UTC+4 ( )
  - Summer (DST): UTC+5 ( )

Lukashin (Armenian: Լուկաշին; formerly, Imeni Mikoyana), is a village in the Armavir Province of Armenia.

It is named after Sargis Lukashin (1883-1937), President of the Armenian Council of People's Commissars.

== See also ==
- Armavir Province
