= Order of the Peacock Angel =

Secret society

Order of the Peacock Angel is the name of a Yazidi-influenced secret society described in the 1961 book, Secret Societies Yesterday and Today (subsequently reissued as A History of Secret Societies). The pseudonymous author, "Arkon Daraul", describes encountering members of the organization in the suburbs of London and attending their rituals. Daraul appears to be the only source for the existence of this group.

"Peacock Angel" is the customary translation of "Tawûsî Melek", the divinity honored by the Yazidis. According to Daraul, the English version of the cult was brought to Britain in 1913 by a Syrian whose name is only known to initiates. Membership grew to encompass "several hundred members throughout Britain" as well as three lodges in the United States".

The group subscribes to a belief in a power governing human affairs, symbolized by a peacock. Recruits are instructed through a series of mental and physical exercises intended to place the experience of emotion under the control of the will. Daraul described a ceremony where robed members engaged in an ecstatic dance in the presence of a large statue of a peacock.

As a sign of identification, "the right hand is placed, with the fingers spread out (perhaps to represent the tail of the peacock) on the left breast, just above the heart." Some members are said to keep live peacocks.

== Fiction ==
Edward D. Hoch's 1965 short novel, People of the Peacock, featured an "Order of the Peacock Angel" which matches the description given in Secret Societies Yesterday and Today:

The society had an uncertain origin in the area that is now Syria and Iraq, some hundreds of years ago. It was imported into England by a mysterious Syrian back in 1913, and has enjoyed some success there. ... The rites of the Peacock Angel consist mostly of white-robed worshippers dancing madly before an eight-foot ebony statue of a peacock.

The novel describes a chapter of the organization in the United States run by a British emigrant.

In Robert Shea and Robert Anton Wilson's 1975 The Illuminatus! Trilogy, "Order of the Peacock Angel" appears in letterhead as the title of an organization taking part in the Discordian "Operation Mindfuck" project outlined in "Appendix Yod".

Cooper McLaughlin's 1987 short novel, The Order of the Peacock Angel, published in The Magazine of Fantasy & Science Fiction, claims historical sources for its tale of a 1,000-year-old society that continued into the 1960s.

== See also ==
- List of Yazidi settlements
- List of Yazidi organizations
