= Zakho resort attack =

2022 strike in Kurdistan Region, Iraq

Coordinates: 37.2777°N 42.7831°E

- Part of Operation Claw-Lock
- Location: Zakho District, Kurdistan Region, Iraq
- Date: 11:16, 20 July 2022 – 11:30, 20 July 2022 (4 years, 3 months, 2 weeks and 6 days ago)
- Attack type: Artillery strikes
- Deaths: 9 (including 2 children)
- Injuries: 33
- Victim: Vacationing tourists
- Perpetrators: Turkey (Iraqi and Kurdish claim); PKK (Turkish claim)

On 20 July 2022, the Barakh tourist resort in the Zakho District of the Kurdistan Region of Iraq was shelled with four or five artillery strikes. The attack killed nine civilians, including two children, and injured 33 others.

The Iraqi federal government and Kurdish authorities claim that Turkish Armed Forces was behind the attack, while the Turkish government denied this and suspected PKK to be responsible. The Iraqi Foreign Minister claimed that the PKK was not in the area at the time of the attack and that it was Turkey that attacked.

All of the victims were Arab tourists from central and southern parts of Iraq.

== Aftermath ==
The Government of Iraq and United Nations both denounced the attack and ordered an investigation into what had happened.

Both the autonomous Kurdish region and federal authorities, including Prime Minister of Iraq Mustafa Al-Kadhimi placed the culpability on the Turkish Armed Forces. The cabinet instructed the Minister of the Exterior to summon the Turkish envoy to Iraq and to demand its Iraqi counterpart in Turkey to come to Baghdad for consultation. Turkey denied responsibility for the attack and instead suspected terrorist groups to be responsible, offering to open a collaborative investigation into the incident.

Turkish consular offices issuing visas were closed down by protests in Najaf as well as in Kerbala, and the Turkish Embassy in Baghdad was besieged. The protesters demanded the Turkish ambassador to be expelled.

== Responses ==
=== Iraq ===
- Prime Minister Mustafa Al-Kadhimi chaired an emergency meeting with the National Security Council with the goal of filing a complaint to the United Nations, as well as summoning Turkish ambassador.
- The Iraqi Communist Party stated that, ''While calling on international organisations and governments in the world to condemn the barbaric Turkish aggression, we also call on the Iraqi government not to allow this criminal act pass without a diplomatic and political response worthy of the blood of the innocent people, and to ensure that Turkish attacks on Iraqi territory are not repeated.''.

=== Other countries ===
- Canada: Canadian Ambassador to Iraq Gregory Galligan said received by the Iraqi News Agency (INA): "I would like to convey my condolences to all the families and friends of the dead and wounded in today's bombing in Zakho, Iraq."
- Germany: A statement by the German Foreign Ministry, received by the Iraqi News Agency (INA), stated that "Germany condemns the Turkish bombing of civilian sites in Zakho, northern Iraq, which killed a number of defenseless civilians."
- Egypt: The Egyptian Ministry of Foreign Affairs said received by the Iraqi News Agency (INA), that "the Arab Republic of Egypt extends its sincere condolences to brotherly Iraq for the victims of the brutal attack that targeted a tourist resort in the Duhok Governorate in Iraqi Kurdistan, which resulted in the death and injury of a number of civilian Iraqis."
- Iran: The spokesman for the Iranian Ministry of Foreign Affairs, Nasser Kanaani, condemned the "bombing of the Iraqi city of Zakho, which resulted in deaths and injuries of citizens."
- Saudi Arabia: The Saudi Foreign Ministry expressed "the Kingdom of Saudi Arabia's condemnation and denunciation of the attack on brotherly Iraq, which targeted the Dohuk Governorate in northern Iraq.".
- Turkey: The spokesperson of the ruling party, Ömer Çelik, said the following about the issue: "The Turkish Armed Forces is the most sensitive army in the world to protect civilians. Even in the most difficult conditions, the Turkish Armed Forces showed this sensitivity. It is clear that it is a typical PKK attack, from the weapon used and the method."
- United Kingdom: UK Foreign and Commonwealth Office condemned the bombing, stating "The United Kingdom is deeply concerned about reports of civilian casualties as a result of an attack in Zakho area in Dohuk on July 20," the FCO added "We extend our deepest condolences to those affected and express our support to the Iraqi authorities in their investigation," noting that the United Kingdom "deplores the loss of life and will continue to support the stability of Iraq, including the Kurdistan region of Iraq."
- United States: Ned Price, US department of state Spokesperson has condemned the attack, stating "The killing of civilians is unacceptable, and all states must respect their obligations under international law, including the protection of civilians."

=== International organisations ===
- Arab League: The spokesman for the Arab League pointed out that "the Arab League supports Iraq in rejecting and condemning the Turkish attacks, and that it condemns any encroachment or violation of the sovereignty of any of the Arab countries."
- United Nations: United Nations Assistance Mission for Iraq condemned the deadly artillery shelling, stating "Under international law, attacks must not be directed at the civilian population. UNAMI therefore calls for a thorough investigation to determine the circumstances surrounding the attack, and emphasizes that the sovereignty and territorial integrity of the Republic of Iraq must be respected at all times."

== See also ==
- 1995 Zakho bombing
