= Nagham Nawzat =

Iraqi Yazidi Doctor (born 1978)

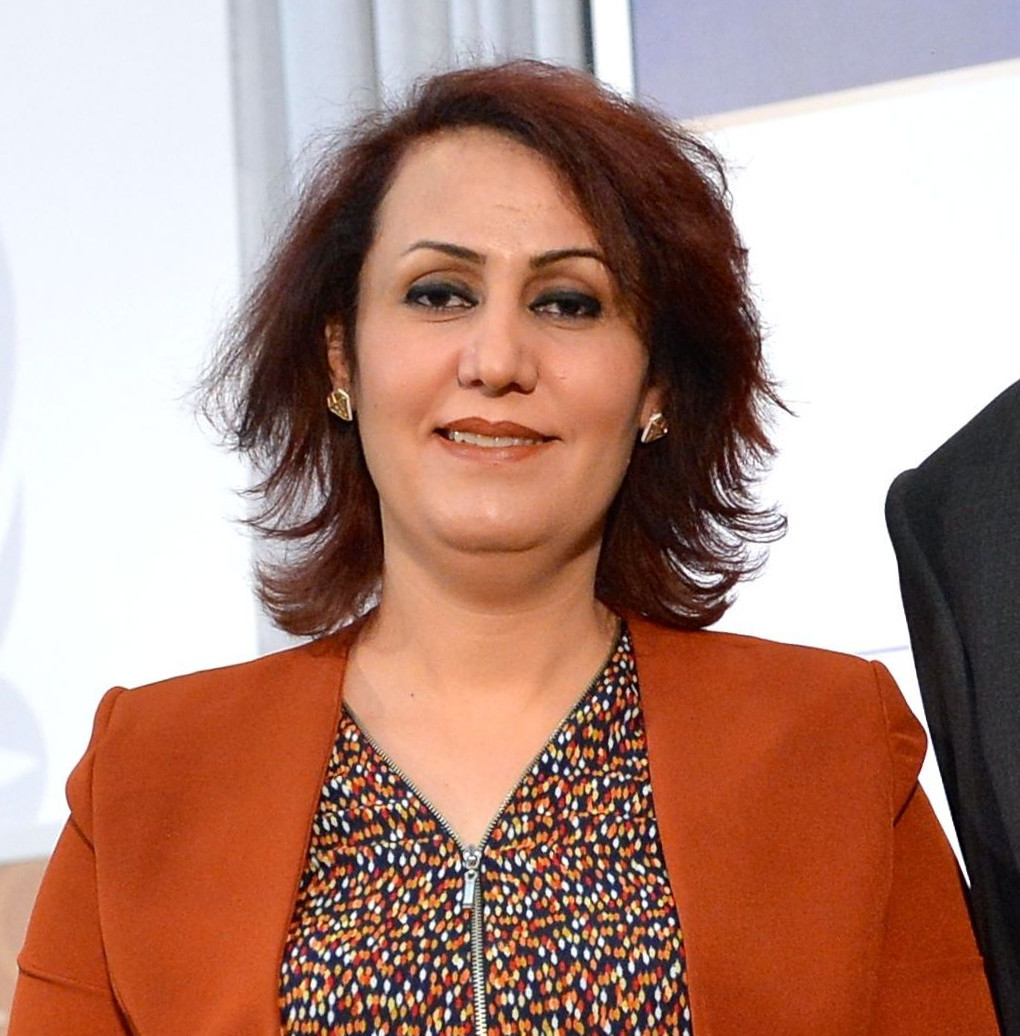
- Born: c. 1978; Bashiqa?
- Known for: International Women of Courage Award

Nagham Nawzat Hasan (Arabic: نغم نوزات حسن, born 1978) is an Iraqi Yazidi Doctor who was given an International Women of Courage Award in 2016.

== Life ==
Hasan is a Yazidi activist and gynaecologist whose home town was Bashiqa. She came to notice in 2014 following the takeover of the town of Sinjar by Islamic State forces. The local Yazidi population were killed and young girls were taken into sexual slavery.

Hasan realised the impact that this would have and she visited camps to offer counselling to those involved.

On 29 March 2016 she was recognised with an International Women of Courage Award for "promoting gender equality, combatting gender-based violence, and providing". She was also awarded a Silver Rose for her human rights work in June 2014 from the European Solidar organisation. Afterwards she returned to continue her work in Women Survivors’ Center in Dohouk.

== See also ==
- Yazidi doctor devotes her life to women who survived Islamic State, Sebastian Castelier, 18 October 2018, middleeasteye
