= Ibrahim Khalil (singer) =

Yazidi singer and songwriter

Ibrahim Khalil Ibrahim Khalil
- Khalil in 2020

Background information
- Born: Ibrahim Khalil; May 5, 2000 (age 26); Al-Hasakah, Syria
- Genres: Folk, Pop
- Occupations: singer, songwriter
- Instrument: Voice
- Years active: 2012–present
- Label: Ibrahim Khalil
- Website: ibrahim-khalil.com

Ibrahim Khalil (Kurdish: Îbrahîm Xelîl, May 5, 2000, Al-Hasakah, Syria) is a Syrian Yazidi singer and songwriter.

== Biography ==
Ibrahim Khalil was born on May 5, 2000, in Al-Hasakah in the Syrian Arab Republic in a Yazidi family of musicians. He made his first musical steps at the age of 9. At the age of 11 he began to study music in Al-Haskaha music school.

Ibrahim has been living in Germany since 2012. He attended the Clemens-Brentano European School in Lollar.

== Musical career ==
Ibrahim Khalil released the first music video in 2012 entitled "Beje beje". Later the singer released the songs "Heyo" and "Bivinm". Ibrahim Khalil is also a songwriter. He wrote songs for Armenian singers Jangir Broyan and Artur Safoyan.

His style of music is varied, including pop ballads as well as traditional Kurdish folk music.

=== Discography ===
==== Singles ====
- 2016 Feb – "Ay Dil" (My Heart)
- 2016 Feb – "Keçka Êzidî" (Yazidi Girl)
- 2016 Sep – "Shems Xayeme" (Sunshine)
- 2017 Feb – "Êz Çi Bikîm Min Hez Bikî" (What should I do to love myself)
- 2017 Jun – "Seva Te" (For you)
- 2017 Oct – "Tu Tu Tu" (You you you) (With Amar Zakharov, David Odi)
- 2018 Jan – "Şaya Artur" (Artur's wedding)
- 2018 Jun – "Ez Berfim" (Beautiful winter snow)
- 2018 Dec – "Potpori/Govend" (Yazidi mashup)
- 2019 May – "Romanci" (Romantic)
- 2019 Jun – "Yazidi Mashup" (With Ishkhan Dengbej)
- 2019 Oct – "Ezdixana Mine" (My Yazidi people)
- 2019 Dec – "Bvinm" (I want to see you)
- 2019 Mar – "Le Le Le" (With Vle Khaloyan)
- 2020 Jun – "Kûda Ez Herîm" (Where should I go?)
- 2020 Julc – "Miran & Anna"

==== Music videos ====
Year	Title	Artist
2017	Lalisha Nurani (The Holy Lalish)	Ibrahim Khalil
2017	Şaya Şemoyê	Ibrahim Khalil (With Arthur Safoyan)
2017	De u Bave Te (Your parents)	Ibrahim Khalil
2018	Heyo	Ibrahim Khalil
2018	Dil Deşe (Sad heart)	Ibrahim Khalil
2018	Eman	Ibrahim Khalil (With Hamik Tamoyan)
2020	Were Dilo	Ibrahim Khalil
