= Bulaqlı =

- Municipality
- Location within Azerbaijan
- Coordinates: 39°59′N 48°31′E
- Country: Azerbaijan
- Rayon: Sabirabad

Population
  - Total: 1,183
- Time zone: UTC+4 (AZT)
  - Summer (DST): UTC+5 (AZT)

Bulaqlı is a village and municipality in the Sabirabad Rayon of Azerbaijan. This village has a population of 1,183.
