= Eyaz Zaxoyî =

Kurdish singer and composer (1960–1986)

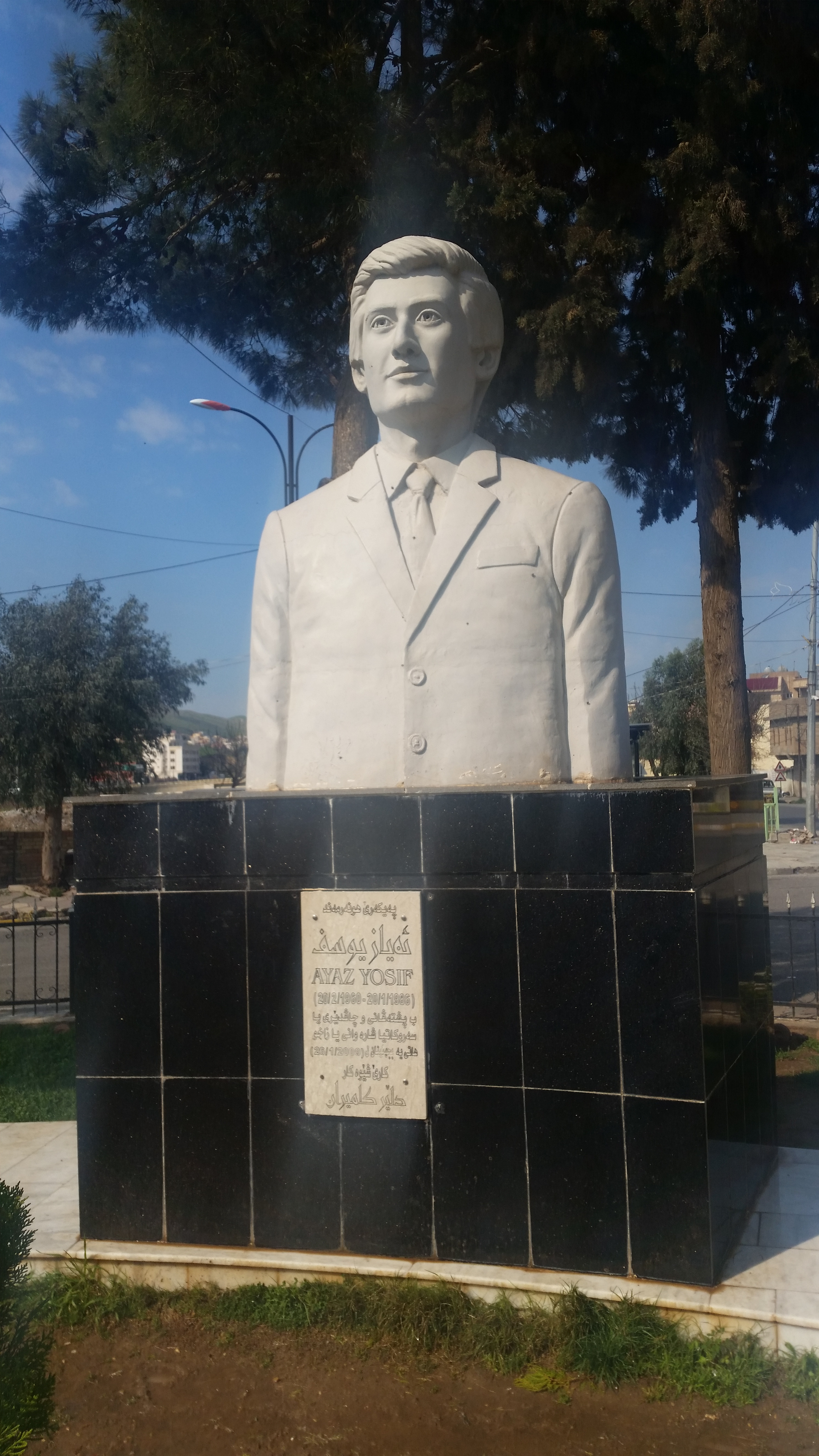
Statue of Eyaz Zaxoyî in Zakho

Eyaz Youssef Ahmed or Eyaz Zaxoyî (20 February 1960 Zakho – 20 January 1986 Erbil), was a celebrated Kurdish songwriter-singer and Composer from Zakho.
