= Hatsashen =

Hatsashen Հացաշեն
- Location within Armenia Location within Aragatsotn
- Coordinates: 40°26′N 43°46′E
- Country: Armenia
- Province: Aragatsotn
- Municipality: Talin

Population (2011)
  - Total: 278
- Time zone: UTC+4
  - Summer (DST): UTC+5

Hatsashen (Armenian: Հացաշեն) is a village in the Talin Municipality of the Aragatsotn Province of Armenia.
