= Charchakis =

Charchakis Ճարճակիս
- Location within Armenia Location within Aragatsotn
- Coordinates: 40°42′12″N 44°19′34″E
- Country: Armenia
- Province: Aragatsotn
- Municipality: Alagyaz

Population (2011)
  - Total: 443
- Time zone: UTC+4 ( )
  - Summer (DST): UTC+5 ( )

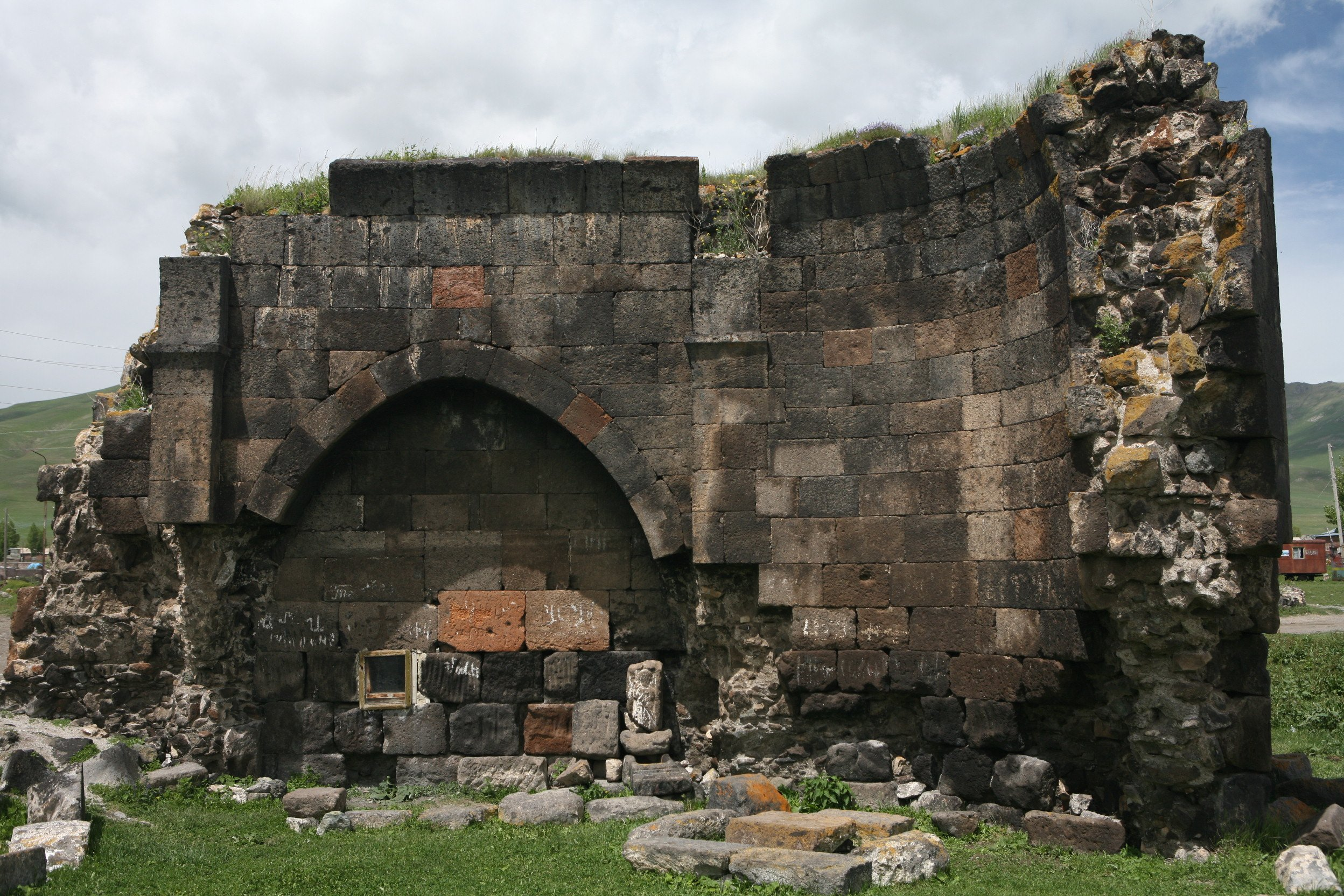
Dzhardzharis church

Charchakis (Armenian: Ճարճակիս) is a village in the Alagyaz Municipality of the Aragatsotn Province of Armenia. It was originally known as Charchakes and Jarjaris. Between 1978 and 2006 the village was known as Derek. Derek means spring or source in Kurmanji Kurdish. It is home to a ruined church dating back to the 5th century.
