= Gir Zerk =

Gir Zerk العدنانية
- Village
- Location in Iraq
- Coordinates: 36°11′2″N 41°45′35″E
- Country: Iraq
- Governorate: Ninawa
- District: Sinjar District

Population (July 2014)
  - Total: 18,000

Gir Zerk (Arabic: العدنانية; Kurdish: گرزه‌رک, romanized: Gir Zerik, also known in Arabic as al-Adnaniyah) is a village located in the Sinjar District of the Ninawa Governorate in northern Iraq. The village is located south of the Sinjar Mount. It belongs to the disputed territories of Northern Iraq.

Gir Zerk has exclusively Yazidi population.
