= Tepeyolu =

Tepeyolu Tiltirik
- Location in Turkey
- Coordinates: 37°13′44″N 39°53′23″E
- Country: Turkey
- Province: Şanlıurfa
- District: Viranşehir
- Post code: 63700

Tepeyolu (Kurdish: Tiltirik) is a village located in the Viranşehir district of the Şanlıurfa Province in southeastern Turkey. The village is situated approximately 10 kilometres (6.2 mi) east of Viranşehir in southeastern Anatolia.

It is populated by Yazidis.
