= Arevut =

Arevut Արևուտ
- Location within Armenia Location within Aragatsotn
- Coordinates: 40°22′N 43°47′E
- Country: Armenia
- Province: Aragatsotn
- Municipality: Arevut

Population (2011)
  - Total: 125
- Time zone: UTC+4
  - Summer (DST): UTC+5

Arevut (Armenian: Արևուտ), known as Duzkend until 1935 and Barozh until 2006, is a village in the Arevut Municipality of the Aragatsotn Province of Armenia. The town is mostly populated by Yazidis.
