= Abdullah Shrem =

Iraqi humanitarian

Abdullah Shrem is an Iraqi humanitarian. He is credited with saving hundreds of Yazidi women and children kidnapped and held captive by ISIS. He was nominated for a 2022 Aurora Humanitarian prize.

== Biography ==
Abdullah Shrem is a Yazidi from Iraqi Kurdistan. Shrem worked as a beekeeper selling honey in Iraq and Syria. After his sister and niece went missing, he devoted himself to rescuing them and other Yazidi women and girls who had been trafficked by ISIS as slaves. Shrem developed an elaborate smuggling network using cigarette smugglers and undercover informants to save the captured women. Shrem has rescued 399 women and children. He has continued his efforts rescuing captured women after the defeat of ISIS.

Shrem and his efforts are the subject of Dunya Mikhail’s 2018 book The Beekeeper: Rescuing the Stolen Women of Iraq, as well as the Frontline PBS documentary, Escaping ISIS
