= Berkashat =

Village in Armavir, Armenia

Berkashat Բերքաշատ
- Location within Armenia
- Coordinates: 40°3′N 43°55′E
- Country: Armenia
- Marz (Province): Armavir
- Founded: 1928

Population (2011)
  - Total: 520
- Time zone: UTC+4 ( )
  - Summer (DST): UTC+5 ( )

Berkashat (Armenian: Բերքաշատ) is a village in the Armavir Province of Armenia.

== See also ==
- Armavir Province
