= Lernamerdz =

Lernamerdz Լեռնամերձ
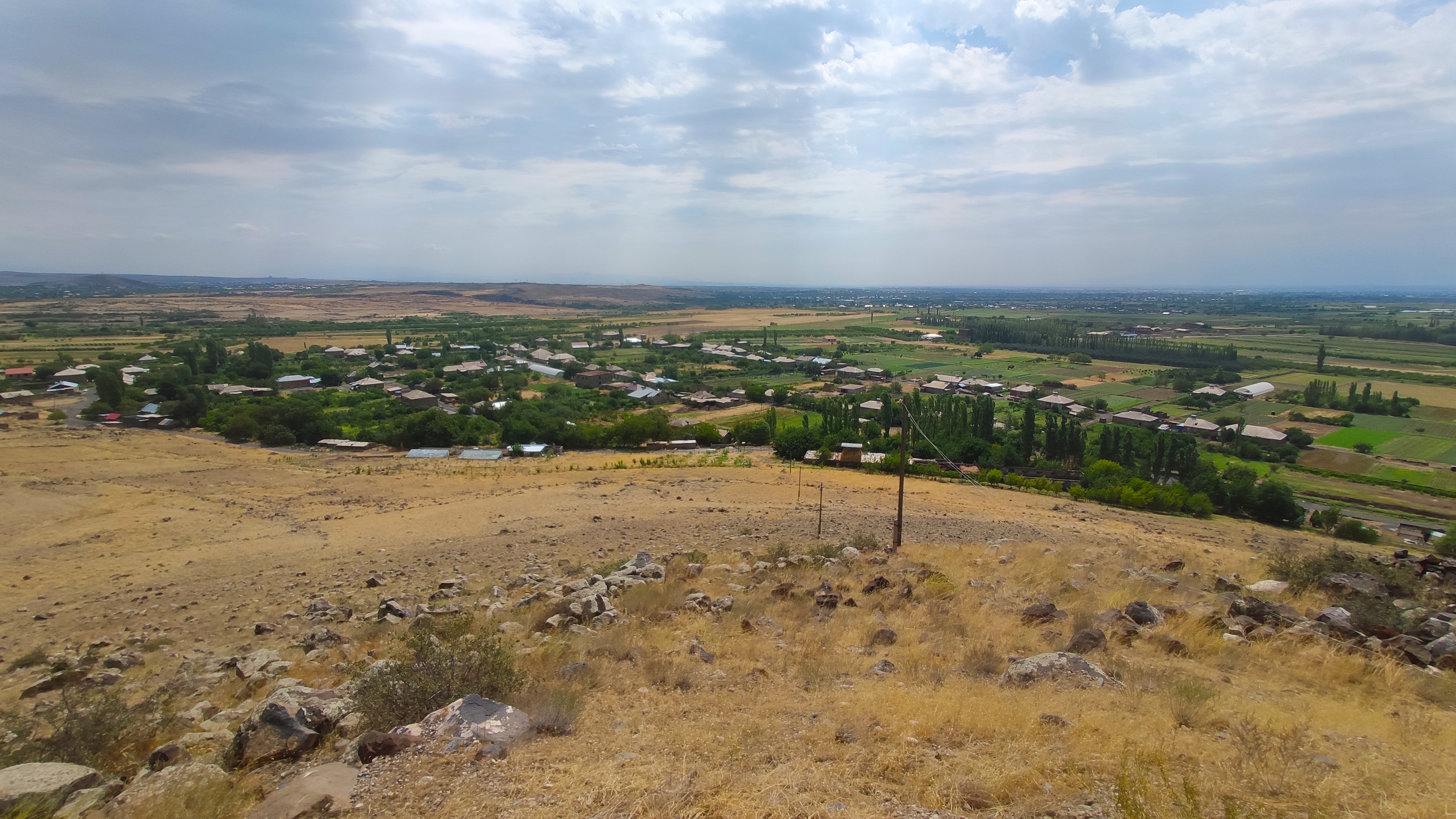
- Լեռնամերձ (Արմավիրի մարզ)

- Location within Armenia
- Coordinates: 40°15′48″N 44°15′49″E
- Country: Armenia
- Marz (Province): Armavir

Population (2011)
  - Total: 384
- Time zone: UTC+4 ( )
  - Summer (DST): UTC+5 ( )

Lernamerdz (Armenian: Լեռնամերձ, also Romanized as Lernamerts; formerly, Ayarlu) is an Armenian village of 400 people in Armavir Province that still follows Soviet communism, even after the fall of the Soviet Union in 1991.

Prior to 1991, year during which the Soviet Union was dissolved, there were only 5 registered communists in Lernamerdz.

Today, all of the villagers claim that they adhere to the socialist ideology, and think that "everyone will be happy then and the sun will shine brightly" if communism is reestablished in Armenia. The village, also called "Little Cuba" has attracted many communist visitors, because of its special status.

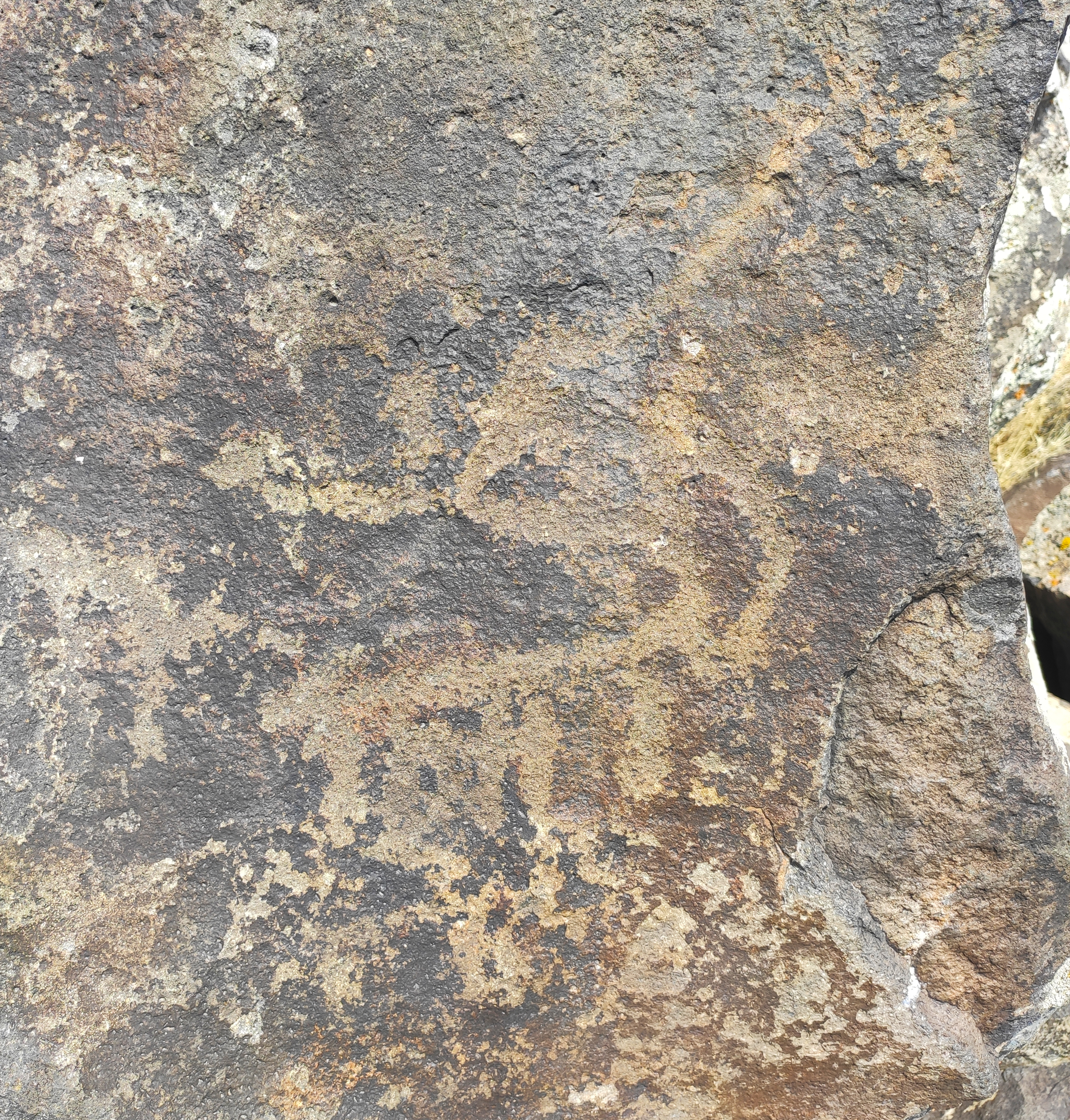
Lernamerdz petroglyph
