= Erdewan Zaxoyî =

Erdewan Zaxoyî ئەردەوان زاخۆیی
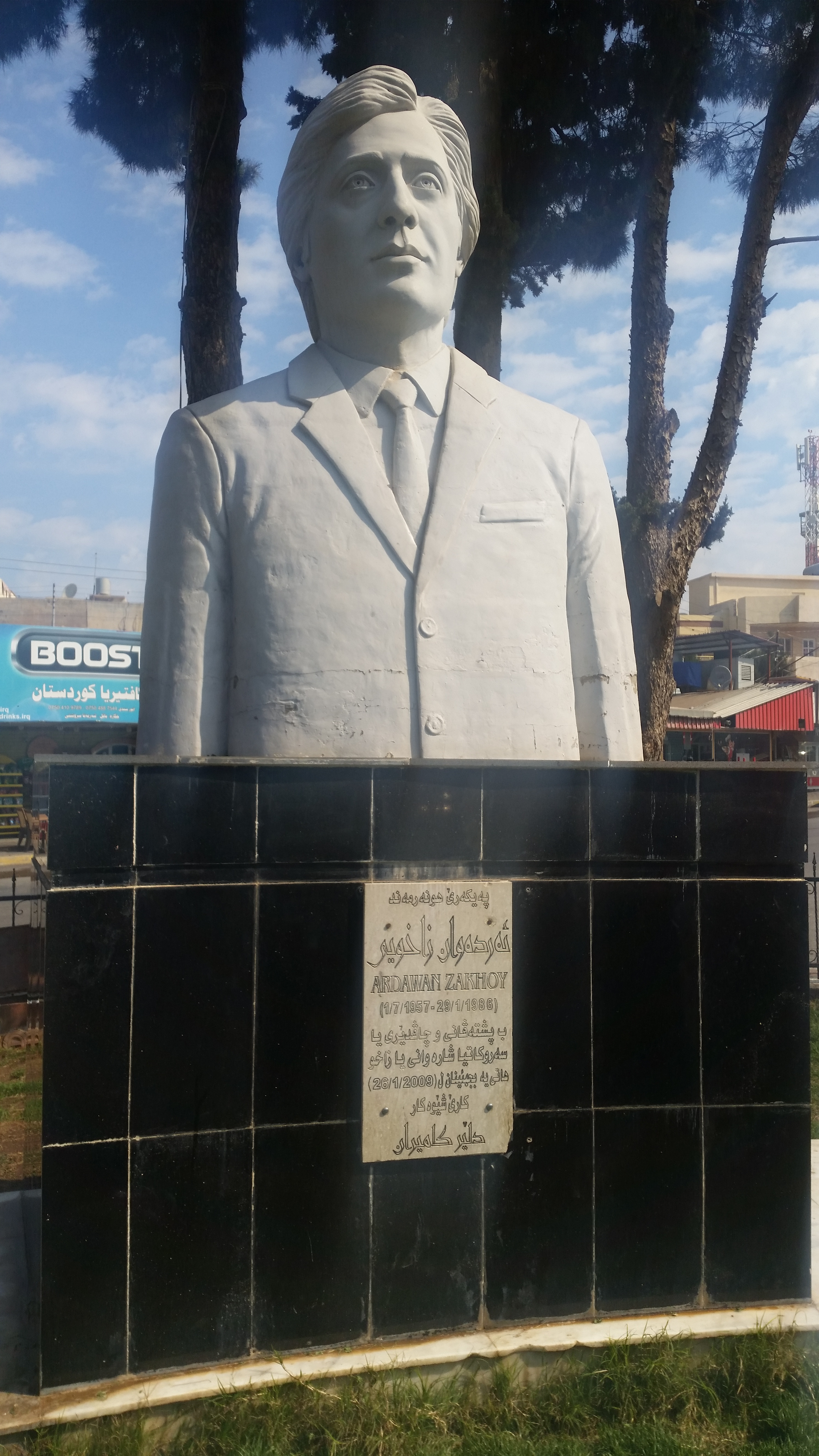
- Statue of Erdewan Zaxoyi in Zakho

Background information
- Born: Erdewan Elî; July 1957; Zakho, Kurdistan, Iraq
- Died: January 1986 (aged 28)
- Genres: Kurdish folk music, Political songs
- Occupations: Singer, songwriter, composer
- Instrument: Vocals
- Years active: 1978–1986

Erdewan Zaxoyî (Kurdish: ئەردەوان زاخۆیی, Erdewan Zaxoyî) (July 1957 – January 1986) was a celebrated Kurdish songwriter-singer and composer from Zakho.

Erdewan Zaxoyî was born in 1957 as Erdewan Elî in Zaxo (Iraqi Kurdistan). He was one of a total of six children and grew up in his hometown and spent his youth there as well. In 1978, he released his first recorded tape, singing on Kurdish political texts, even though it was banned at the time. He later secretly supported the Kurdish Peshmerga soldiers with his songs and folk songs, such as with Peşmergekê çelengêm. His songs were mostly about justice and freedom. He also wrote songs about his hometown Zaxo and Kurdistan.

In 1982, he fled to the Kurdish region of Iran following persecution by Saddam Hussein's regime. He lived there until the end of 1985 and wrote more songs. The content of these was in addition to the love of home, his homesickness and the yearning for his family, especially his mother, to whom he also sent his entire recorded tapes.

In January 1986, he finally returned and was reportedly abducted in the same year at a concert for the Kurds living in Baghdad by agents of the Secret Service of Iraq and probably murdered. To this day he has not been found.

After his disappearance, a monument was erected for him in Zaxo. It is located near the historic Delal Bridge, which he often mentioned in his texts. In addition, in February 2006, a celebration in memory of him and Eyaz Zaxoyi, a well-known singer, aligned in Duhok. At the ceremony, former Dahuk Governor Tamar Kuchar gave a speech on the lives and works of the two artists.

His wife and children live in Sweden today.
