= Kocadağ, Nusaybin =

Village in Mardin Province, Turkey

Kocadağ
- Neighbourhood
- Location in Turkey
- Coordinates: 37.188°N 41.662°E
- Country: Turkey
- Province: Mardin
- District: Nusaybin
- Population (2021): 296
- Time zone: UTC+3 (TRT)

Kocadağ (Kurdish: Gelîye Pîra) is a neighbourhood in the municipality and district of Nusaybin, Mardin Province in Turkey. The village is populated by Kurds of the Dasikan tribe and had a population of 296 in 2021. The village is Yazidi.
