= Bozan, Iraq =

Bozan
- Village
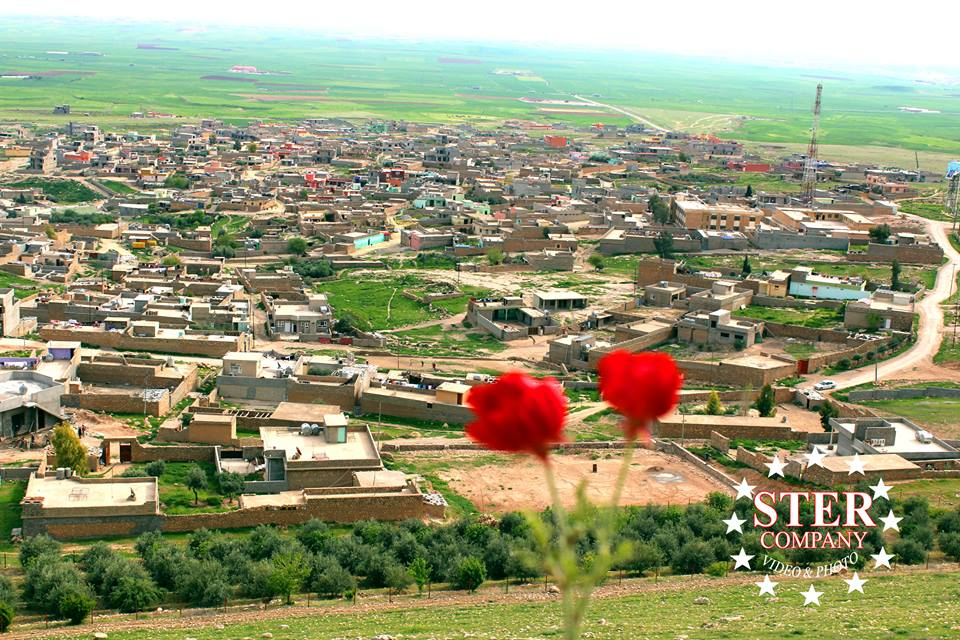

- Location in Iraq Bozan (Iraqi Kurdistan)
- Coordinates: 36°44′15″N 43°7′45″E
- Country: Iraq
- Federal region: Kurdistan Region (de facto)
- Governorate: Nineveh Governorate (de jure); Dohuk Governorate (de facto)
- District: Tel Kaif District

Bozan (Arabic: بزان; Syriac: Beṯ Bōzi) (Note: Alternatively transliterated as Bōzān.) is a village in Nineveh Governorate, Iraq. It is located in the Tel Kaif District in the Nineveh Plains and mostly inhabited by Yazidis. In the village, it is claimed that there are 360 Yazidi religious monuments, for which it is known as "Little Lalish" (Kurdish: Lalişa Piçuk).

== History ==
Bozan is first attested as a Christian village with the name Beṯ Bōzi and its population adhered either to the Church of the East or the Syriac Orthodox Church. A monastery is known to have existed at the village, which likely remained mostly Christian until the thirteenth or fourteenth centuries. Several Yazidi mausoleums were constructed at Bozan in the 12th century, including that of Sheikh Alû Bekir, Sheikh Chams, Pîr Alî & Pîr Buwal, Xetî Besî, whilst the mausoleum of Sheikh Adî was built in the 13th century, and the mausoleums of Ruale Kevînîye and Sheikh Mand Pacha date to the 14th century.

Most of Bozan's population of 6000 people fled to Zakho at the approach of the Islamic State of Iraq and the Levant (ISIL) offensive in August 2014, whilst a number of locals remained to defend the village. However, the ISIL fighters did not reach the village and its population began to return a month later. By June 2018, the village's population had recovered to 5000 people with 1000 families, and was also inhabited by roughly 300 displaced Yazidi families from Sinjar.

== Bibliography ==
- Açikyildiz, Birgül (2009). "The Sanctuary of Shaykh ʿAdī at Lalish: Centre of Pilgrimage of the Yezidis". Bulletin of the School of Oriental and African Studies. 72 (2): 301–333. doi:10.1017/S0041977X09000536. S2CID 130641873.
- Açikyildiz, Birgül (2012). "Cultural Interaction between Anatolia and Mosul in the Case of Yezidi Architecture". Publications de l'Institut Français d'Études Anatoliennes. 25: 147–164.
- Fraser, James Baillie (1841). Mesopotamia and Assyria: From the Earliest Ages to the Present Time; with Illustrations of Their Natural History. Oliver & Boyd.
- Wilmshurst, David (2000). The Ecclesiastical Organisation of the Church of the East, 1318–1913 (PDF). Peeters Publishers.
