= Shenik, Armavir =

Village in Armavir, Armenia

Shenik Շենիկ
- Location within Armenia
- Coordinates: 40°12′N 43°46′E
- Country: Armenia
- Marz (Province): Armavir
- Founded: 1969

Population (2011)
  - Total: 975
- Time zone: UTC+4 ( )
  - Summer (DST): UTC+5 ( )

Shenik (Armenian: Շենիկ), is a village in the Armavir Province of Armenia. It was founded in 1969 in the southwestern part of Armavir Province, at an area was once closed to foreigners.

== See also ==
- Armavir Province
