= Berdik =

Village in Ararat, Armenia

Berdik Բերդիկ
- Location within Armenia Location within Ararat
- Coordinates: 40°00′N 44°34′E
- Country: Armenia
- Province: Ararat
- Municipality: Artashat

Population (2011)
  - Total: 776
- Time zone: UTC+4
  - Summer (DST): UTC+5

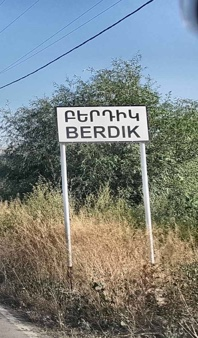
Entrance to Berdik village.

Berdik (Armenian: Բերդիկ) is a village in the Artashat Municipality of the Ararat Province of Armenia.
