= Walid Yunis Ahmad =

Iraqi television journalist

- Born: Walid Yunis Ahmad; Zakho, Iraq
- Other names: وه‌لید یونس ئه‌حمه‌د
- Occupations: Television journalist, program organizer, translator
- Known for: Detained without trial for 11 years in Iraqi Kurdistan
- Notable work: Reporting in Kurdish, Arabic, and Turkmen; coverage linked to Islamic Movement of Kurdistan

Walid Yunis Ahmad (Kurdish: وه‌لید یونس ئه‌حمه‌د, Walid Yunis Ahmad) (born in Zakho) is an Iraqi television journalist who was detained without trial for 11 years after his arrest in Erbil, the capital city of the autonomous Iraqi Kurdistan, on 6 February 2000. In March 2011, he was sentenced to five more years in prison.

== Background and arrest ==
Prior to his arrest, Walid Yunis Ahmad, who is ethnically Turkmen, worked as a program organizer and translator for a radio and television station, reporting in Kurdish, Arabic and Turkmen. Amnesty International reported that the station may have been associated with the opposition party Islamic Movement of Kurdistan.

Ahmad stated that on the day of his arrest, he took a ride in someone else's car after a meeting of the Islamic Movement when police promptly stopped and searched his acquaintance's vehicle. The officers stated that they found explosive material and arrested Ahmad on the spot. Ahmad was then detained for ten years without charge or trial; for the first three years, his family was unaware of his whereabouts. Ahmad's family reported after a visit in 2008 that they found him in poor health due to a recent hunger strike. Ahmad alleges that he was tortured during this period by security forces.

== Charges and trial ==
According to the "secret informants", Walid Yunis Ahmad was linked to explosives that were discovered in Dohuk in 2009, despite having been in detention for nine years. In January 2011, formal charges were filed against him, and in March 2011, he was convicted. Amnesty International alleges that he did not receive a fair trial, and that the charges were fabricated to justify his lengthy detention. The organization has named him a "priority case" and urged his immediate release.
