= Amirkhan Mori =

Georgian businessman (born 1961)

- Born: November 13, 1961 (age 64); Tbilisi, Georgia
- Education: Moscow State University
- Occupation: Businessman
- Known for: Chairman of the Regions Group

Amirkhan Alikovich Mori (born November 13, 1961) is a Georgian businessman and chairman of Regions Group. Mori is a Kurdish Yazidi.

== Business Career ==
Amirkhan Mori is one of the core owners of the Regions Group established in 2004 (alongside Alikhan and Amiran Mutsoevs and Alexander Karpov).

The Regions Group has a focus on retail real estate, owns a chain of Iyun (“June”) retail and entertainment centers and a chain of Sibirsky Gorodok (“Small Town in Siberia”) shopping malls in different cities across Russia. According to Russian media, the Group owned 27 operating retail and retail and entertainment facilities with a total area of 600,000 square meters at year-end 2013. Another four facilities are under construction, and construction of new Iyun retail and entertainment centers in Omsk, Saratov and Penza. According to the Russia TOP-100 list by INFOLine Developers, the Regions Group is the fourth largest real estate owner in Russia. In addition, the Regions Group is planning to invest approximately US$1 billion in construction of DreamWorks Animation theme parks in Russia.

== Wealth ==
Mori, alongside his partners by the Regions Group Alikhan and Amiran Mutsoev, regularly makes it to the Russian Forbes top 10 list of the richest real estate owners in Russia (both domestic and overseas-based).

In August 2013, Amirkhan Mori acquired an 18.5% equity stake in Polyus Gold, a major gold producer in Russia. Russian media estimates the value of the stake at US$1.83 billion.
