= Imad Youkhana Yaqo =

Iraqi Assyrian politician

- ܥܝܡܕ ܝܘܟܢܐ ܝܩܘ عماد يوخنا يقو

Member of Iraqi Parliament
- In office March 2010 – 2018
- Prime Minister: Nouri al-Maliki; Haider al-Abadi
- Succeeded by: Rehan Hana

Deputy Secretary-General of Assyrian Democratic Movement
- In office Unknown–2019
- Succeeded by: Yacoob Yaco

Personal details
- Born: 2 July 1966 (age 60) Amedi, Duhok, Iraq
- Party: Assyrian Democratic Movement
- Children: 2 daughters, 1 son
- Education: University of Baghdad
- Occupation: Politician

Imad Youkhana Yaqo (Syriac: ܥܝܡܕ ܝܘܟܢܐ ܝܩܘ, Arabic: عماد يوخنا يقو) is an Iraqi Assyrian politician. He was a member of the Council of Representatives of Iraq after winning the 2010 and 2014 elections, running as part of the Assyrian Democratic Movement and the Rafidain List.

A member of the Assyrian Church of the East, Yaqo's involvement in politics came during the height of the Iraq War and the Assyrian exodus from Iraq. As Deputy Secretary-General, Imad was a second high-level official within Zowaa until the late 2010s, when he was replaced by Yacoob Yaco.

== Early life ==
Yaqo was born in 1966 in the town of Amedi in the Duhok Governorate and received a Bachelor's in Agriculture from the University of Baghdad in 1990. He initially worked in trade and entrepreneurship until the 2003 invasion of Iraq, when he first joined the Assyrian Democratic Movement and became responsible for their Kirkuk branch.

== Electoral history ==
In the 2010 Iraqi parliamentary election, Yaqo was elected alongside Basimah Yusuf Butrus and Yonadam Kanna to parliament. The elections were historic as it was the first time the parliamentary elections had reserved seats for the Assyrian minority.

In the 2014 Iraqi parliamentary election, the parliamentarian seat for the Rafidain List had been won by Sargon Lazar Slewa, however Lazar had voluntarily given up his seat to Yaqo afterwards.

In 2018, Yaqo ran as part of the Rafidain List of ADM, running for Kirkuk Governorate. Although he won third place as part of the list, with a total of 2,675 votes received, he had been unsuccessful in retaining his seat in parliament.

== Political career ==
Throughout his tenure as parliamentarian, Yaqo addressed issues that primarily affected Assyrians in Iraq, including various incidents of discrimination and land grabbing. In 2014, Yaqo denounced several officials in the Nineveh Governorate for engaging in land grabbing against Assyrians and Christians, many of whom had left the country. He urged greater action from local and federal governments to put a stop to the land-grabbing, and for Assyrians/Christians to check their property status. Yaqo has also spoken out on how many lawyers that specialized in the property rights of Baghdad's Christians had received many death threats, and that civil servants identify vacant residencies before altering paperwork to falsify ownership.

In 2015, Yaqo condemned the arrest and sentencing of Sargon Salioh of the Ministry of Environment, calling for an overturn of the verdict and defending Salioh's previous record. He also condemned the 2017 Kurdistan Region independence referendum, calling it unconstitutional and illegal and advocating for other solutions to address the need for unity of Iraq's society.

Around the 2018 Iraqi parliamentary election, Yaqo wrote a letter to the Iraqi Independent High Electoral Commission, calling for the protection of the Assyrian quota seats in order to prevent Arab and Kurdish influence in electing representatives. The IHEC responded by declining the request, stating that having a special election reserved for minorities in Iraq would be discriminatory. Yaqo has also been critical of the Kurdistan Democratic Party in the past, criticizing the Peshmerga's abandonment of Assyrians and Yazidis before the Fall of Mosul to ISIS in an interview with Al Arabiya in November 2017. Yaqo has previously been the target of public attacks from KDP officials, and a month after his interview, Masoud Barzani dismissed Yaqo's statements and asserted that he was lying. In an in-person interview with the Assyrian Policy Institute, Yaqo stated that he was aware of KDP plans to mobilize Kurdish voters for the Assyrian seat in Kirkuk, acknowledging his chances of re-election as slim.

After his time in parliament, Yaqo continued his involvement with Assyrian politics in Iraq. In 2021, he condemned Rayan al-Kildani and the Babylon Movement, stating that neither are representatives of Christians and Assyrians in Iraq. In 2024, he welcomed the return of Chaldean Catholic patriarch Louis Raphaël I Sako to Baghdad after 9 months in Erbil, following a decree that declared Sako and the patriarchite as the guardian of the church in Iraq.

== Personal life ==
In early, 2006, Yaqo's father, Youkhana Yaqo Youkhana was tragically killed when US soldiers dispersed a crowd in Kirkuk who were protesting against high gasoline prices. He had been heading home from his work when he was caught in the middle of the demonstration, and his death was considered an accident. In 2013, Yaqo had been the target of a suicide attack when his home was bombed in Kirkuk. Although Yaqo himself was unharmed, the attack wounded at least 50 people, including his wife and children.

In 2020, Yaqo and his family were reported to have come down with COVID-19, in the midst of the global pandemic and the spread of the disease through Iraq.

Yaqo fluently speaks 5 different languages, namely Assyrian, Arabic, Turkmen, Kurdish, and English.

== Bibliography ==
- Hanna, Reine; Joseph, Max (27 November 2018). Iraq's Stolen Election: How Assyrian Representation Became Assyrian Repression (PDF) (Report). Assyrian Policy Institute.
