= Sharya, Iraq =

Sharya
- Town
- Location in Iraq
- Coordinates: 36°47′22″N 42°58′19″E
- Country: Iraq
- Region: Kurdistan Region
- Governorate: Dohuk Governorate
- District: Simele District

Sharya (also written Shariya, Arabic: شاريا, Kurdish: ,شاریا, romanized: Şariya) is a Yazidi-inhabited town located in the Simele District of the Dohuk Governorate in Kurdistan Region of Iraq. The town is located ca. 15 kilometres (9.3 mi) south of Dohuk.

== Yazidi holy sites ==
Around Sharya, the following Yazidi shrines are found:

1. Şêx Enzerût
2. Pîr Afat
3. Evdê Reş
4. Nasirdîn
5. Siltan Êzîd
6. Şêx Şems
7. Şahsiwar
8. Şêxûbekir
9. Kerecal
10. Şêx Hesen
11. Pîr Bûb
