= Yezidi National Union ULE =

Organization

Flag of the Yezidi National Union ULE

The Yezidi National Union ULE is an organization formed to contribute to the development of mutual perception of the Yezidis and Armenians. The President of the Yezidi National Union is Aziz Tamoyan and the Vice-President is Khdr Hajoyan.

== See also ==
- Yazidis
- List of Yazidi organizations
