= Noramarg =

Village in Ararat, Armenia

Noramarg Նորամարգ
- Location within Armenia Location within Ararat
- Coordinates: 40°01′25″N 44°25′28″E
- Country: Armenia
- Province: Ararat
- Municipality: Masis

Population (2011)
  - Total: 2,069
- Time zone: UTC+4
  - Summer (DST): UTC+5

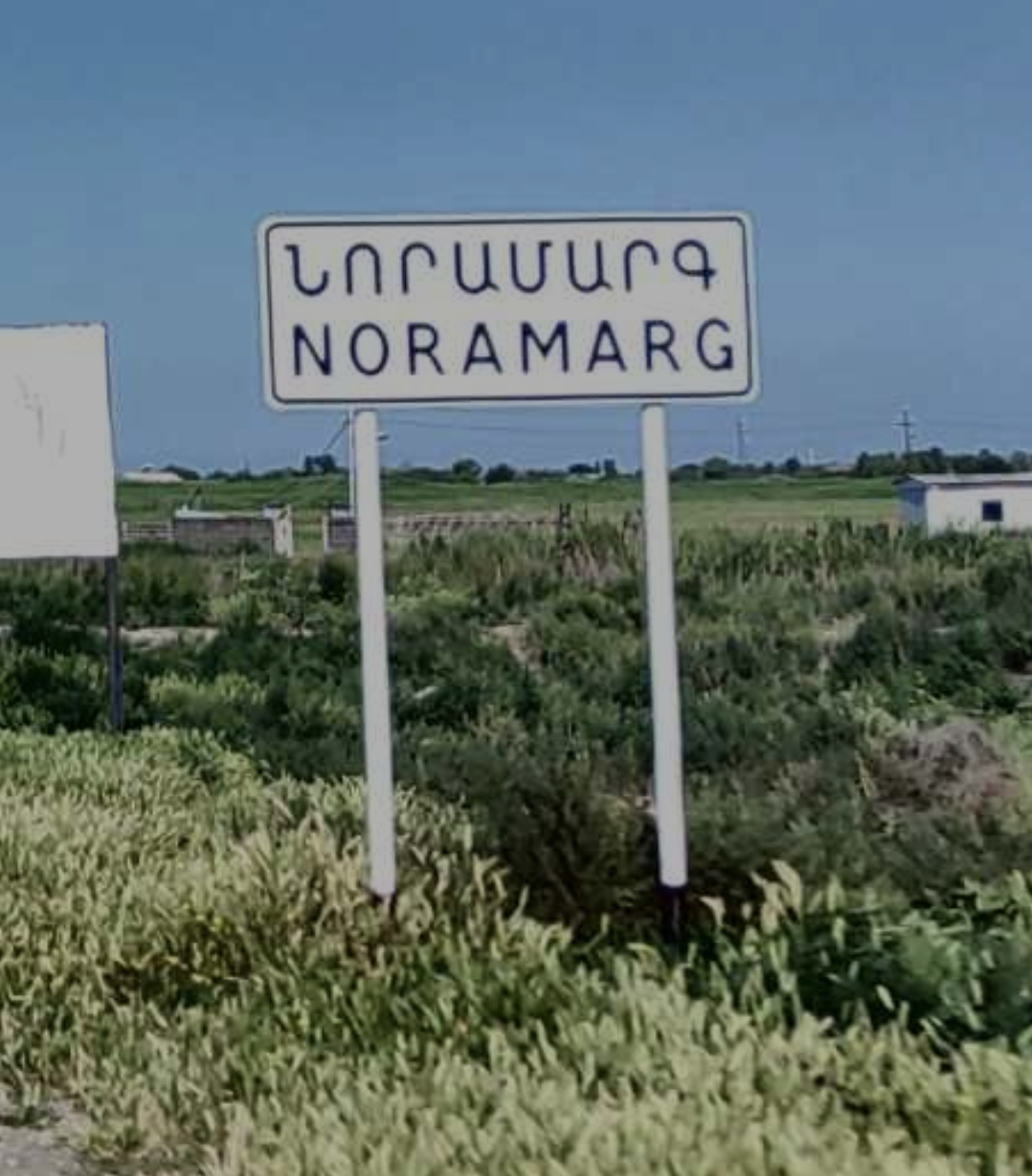
Sign entering to Noramarg

Noramarg (Armenian: Նորամարգ) is a village in the Masis Municipality of the Ararat Province of Armenia.
