= Jraber =

Village in Kotayk, Armenia

Jraber Ջրաբեր
- Location within Armenia
- Coordinates: 40°21′07″N 44°38′42″E
- Country: Armenia
- Marz (Province): Kotayk

Population (2011)
  - Total: 377
- Time zone: UTC+4 ( )
  - Summer (DST): UTC+5 ( )

Jraber (Armenian: Ջրաբեր, also Romanized as Dzhraber and Djraber; formerly, Nikolayevka) is a town in the Kotayk Province of Armenia. The village has a Kurdish minority (including Yazidis).

== See also ==
- Kotayk Province
