= Kanakeravan =

Kanakeravan Քանաքեռավան
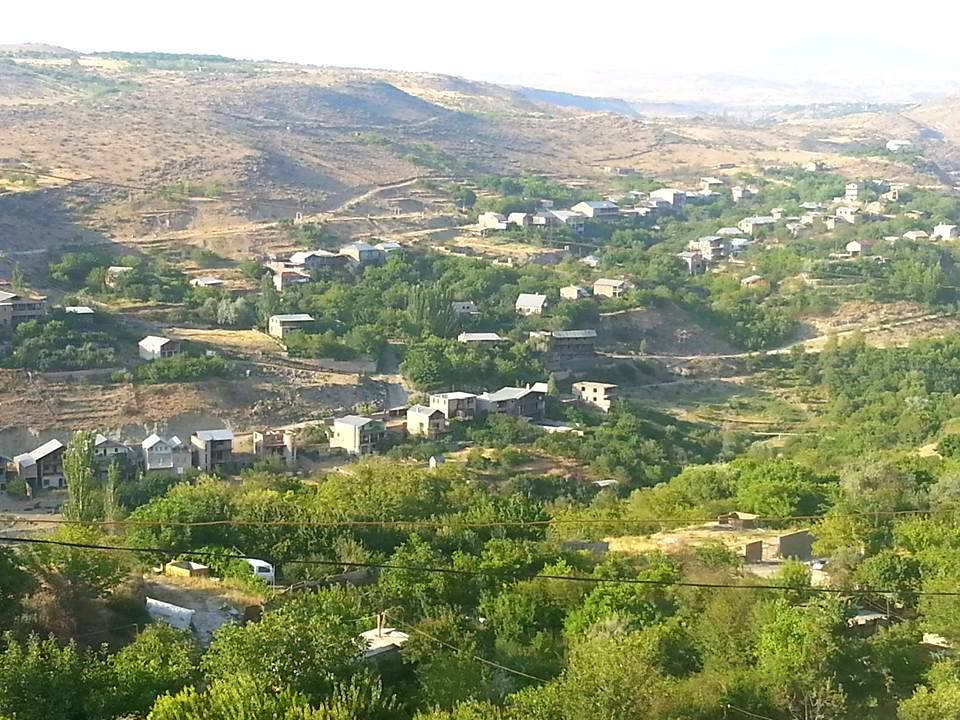
- Kanakeravan

- Location within Armenia
- Coordinates: 40°14′50″N 44°32′12″E
- Country: Armenia
- Province: Kotayk
- Elevation: 1,250 m (4,100 ft)

Population (2011)
  - Total: 3,071
- Time zone: UTC+4 ( )

Kanakeravan (Armenian, Քանաքեռավան), a village in the Kotayk Province of Armenia, 42 km southwest of the province's center, on the high right bank of the Hrazdan river, blocking KERG.

== See also ==
- Kotayk Province
