= Zakho =

City in Iraq

Zakho زاخۆ Zaxo
- City
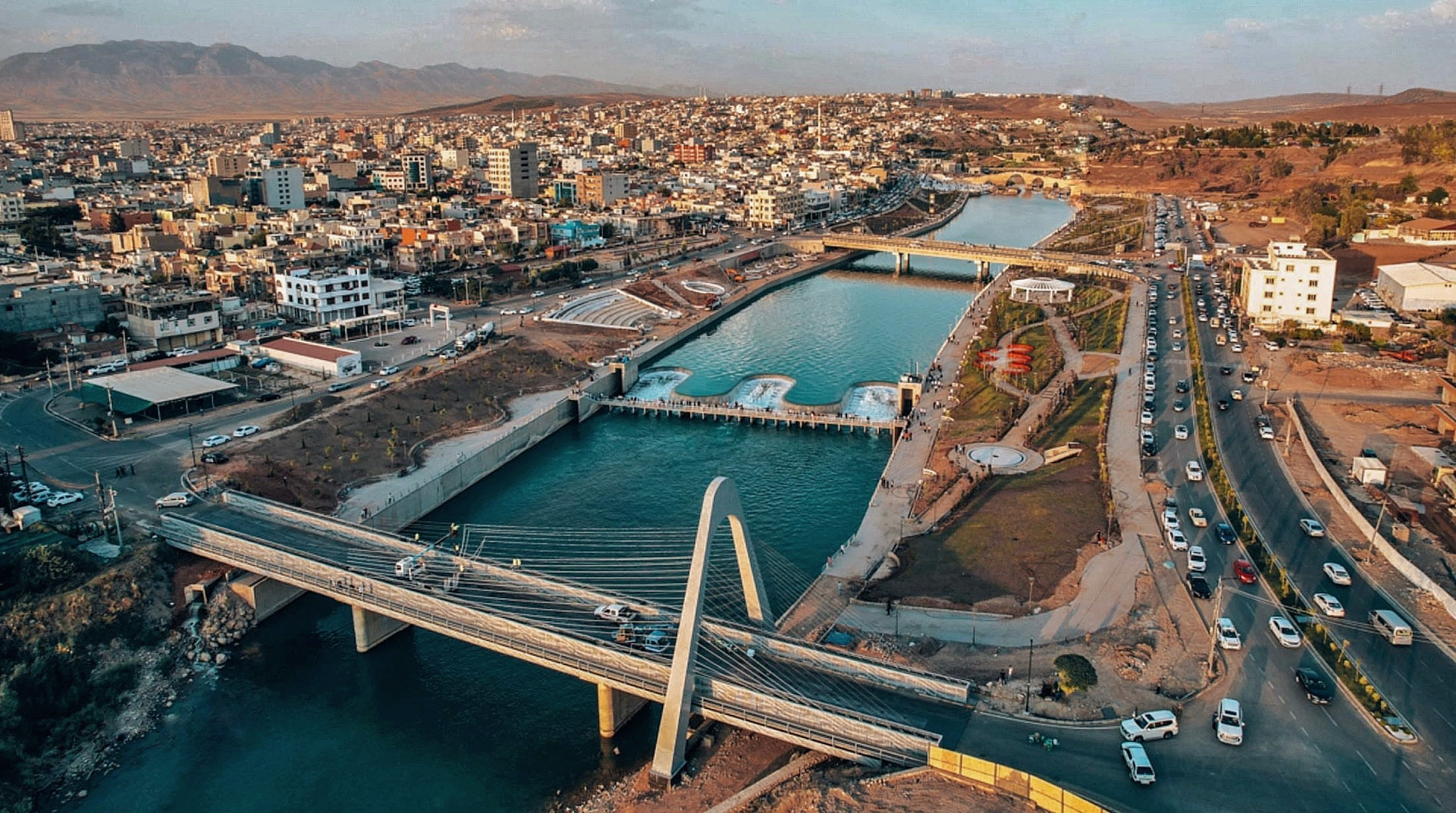
- The Little Khabur flowing through Zakho

- Location in Iraq Zakho (Iraqi Kurdistan)
- Coordinates: 37°08′37.00″N 42°40′54.88″E
- Country: Iraq
- Region: Kurdistan Region
- Governorate: Duhok Governorate
- District: Zakho District

Area
  - Total: 837 km^{2} (323 sq mi)
- Elevation: 440 m (1,440 ft)

Population (2026)
  - Total: 800,000
- Time zone: UTC+3
  - Summer (DST): not observed

Zakho, also spelled Zaxo (Kurdish: زاخۆ, romanized: Zaxo or Zaco, Syriac: ܙܵܟ݂ܘܿ, romanized: Zāḵō, Armenian: Զախո, Arabic: زاخو, Lishanid Noshan: זאכו, romanized: Zāxo) is a city in Kurdistan Region, Iraq, at the centre of the Zakho District of the Dohuk Governorate, located a few kilometers from the Ibrahim Khalil border crossing. Zakho is known for its celebrations of Newroz. The Zakho Military College is located in the urban centre of the city.

The original settlement may have been on a small island in the Little Khabur river, which flows west through the modern city to form the border between Iraq and Turkey, continuing into the Tigris. Other important rivers in the area are the Zeriza and the Seerkotik.

== History ==
Gertrude Bell, the renowned British archaeologist and Arabist who advised British governors in the region in the closing years of the British Mandate, was convinced that Zakho was the same place as the ancient town of Hasaniyeh. She also reported that one of the first Christian missionaries to the region, the Dominican friar Poldo Soldini, was buried there in 1779. His grave was still a pilgrimage destination in the 1950s.

The town is also the site of Zakho castle, of which today only the tower remains, and of Qubad Pasha castle, a hexagonal structure in Zakho cemetery.

According to an oral tradition transmitted by a Jewish informant from Zakho, Me'allim Levi, Zakho was established in 1568 by Slivani tribesmen, whose territory was stretched south of the location of the town. The family of Shamdin Agha came originally from the Slivani tribe, settled in Zakho, and became the most prominent family in Zakho. From the late 19th century onwards, the family of Shamdin Agha ruled "all the Muslims, Jews and Christians of Zakho and its surroundings." Zakho was known to the ancient Greeks. In 1844, the traveller William Francis Ainsworth commented: "The appearance of Zakho in the present day coincides in a remarkable manner with what it was described to be in the time of Xenophon."

=== Medieval history ===
In Islamic history it is perhaps best remembered as the location of the Battle of the Zab between the Umayyads and the Abbasids.

Zakho is a major marketplace with its goods and merchandise serving the Kurdish-controlled area and most of north and central Iraq. Writing in 1818, Campanile described the town as a great trading centre, famous for its gallnuts as well as rice, oil, sesame, wax, lentils and many fruits.

During the Crimean War, the strain on Ottoman military resources allowed Yezdanshir Beg, nephew of the Kurdish ruler Bedirkhan Beg, to launch a major rebellion in the region. In November 1854, he seized Jezira b. Omar, killed local Ottoman administrators, and extended his control toward Zakho. In early 1855, the Ottoman commander Helmy Pasha organized a relief force that included 2,000 Yazidi horsemen under the Mir Hussein Beg of the Sheikhan principality, who according to Hormuzd Rassam recognized Yezdanshir as a more dangerous enemy than the Ottoman governor who had recently deposed him. Yezdanshir was known for his openly hostile views toward Yazidis; the American missionary Henry Lobdell recorded hearing him declare that he wished to drink the blood of every Yazidi, Jew, and Christian he encountered. At Redwan, a British vice-consular source reported an eyewitness account of Yezdanshir personally killing between twenty-five and thirty Yazidis, having offered a bounty for live Yazidis to execute.

Hussein Beg led his forces against the rebels outside Zakho, defeated them, and entered the town without resistance, formally capturing it "in the name of His Majesty the Sultan". For this service, Hussein Beg was received in audience by the sultan and awarded the title of kapi çuhadari (keeper of the official gate).

=== Modern history ===
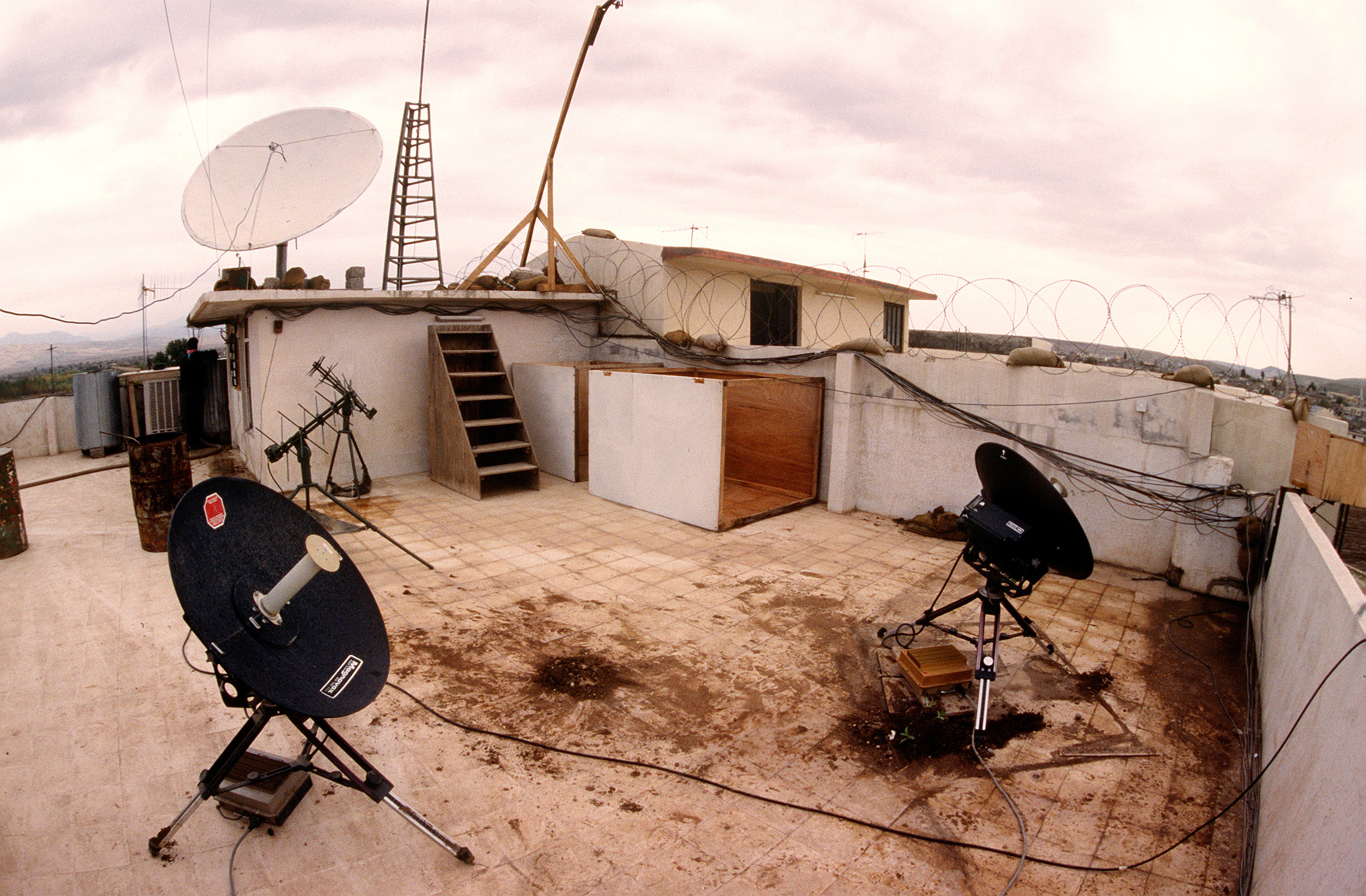
Joint forces headquarters in Zakho, 1993

The population of the town rose from about 30,000 in 1950 to 350,000 in 1992 due to Kurds fleeing from other areas of the country.

During the 1991 uprisings in Iraq following the Gulf War, people in the Zakho district of the Duhok Governorate attacked the military bases, stormed government buildings and took control of the town on 13 March. However, the victory came at a cost, as civilians were killed by forces of Saddam Hussein’s regime during clashes at certain military and intelligence sites in the city. The town was recaptured by government forces on 1 April.

In 1991, Zakho was occupied by the British and the Americans during the Gulf War in "Operation Provide Comfort", to provide support to the Kurdish rebellion against the Iraqi government. Most of the inhabitants of the city had fled to the mountains. In the following years, the city came under the control of the Kurdistan Autonomous Region and many of its Kurdish citizens began to return to the city.

The 27 February 1995 Zakho bombing killed over 50 people. When the U.S. Army closed its military base in Zakho in 1996, they evacuated several thousand Kurds who had connections to the base and who feared reprisals. Many of them were given asylum in the USA. According to David McDowall, this constituted a sudden brain drain, with Zakho losing many of its most educated citizens.

Due to its strategic location and the abundance of job opportunities, Zakho has attracted many workers and job seekers from different parts of Iraq and even from Syria and Turkey. Trade with Turkey is now the major element of the economy. Oil drilling began in 2005.

In 2008 it was reported that the Turkish Armed Forces maintained four bases in Zakho District, under an agreement concluded with the Iraqi government in the 1990s.

The 2011 Dohuk riots, which targeted Yazidi- and Assyrian-owned businesses, were sparked by Kurdish Muslim clerics in the town.

== Climate ==
Zakho has a hot-summer Mediterranean climate (Csa in the Köppen climate classification) with very hot, dry summers, and cool wet winters.

Climate data for Zakho
Month	Jan	Feb	Mar	Apr	May	Jun	Jul	Aug	Sep	Oct	Nov	Dec	Year
Mean daily maximum °C (°F)	10.2 (50.4)	12.2 (54.0)	16.5 (61.7)	21.8 (71.2)	29.1 (84.4)	36.2 (97.2)	40.4 (104.7)	40.0 (104.0)	35.7 (96.3)	27.9 (82.2)	19.4 (66.9)	12.3 (54.1)	25.1 (77.3)
Mean daily minimum °C (°F)	1.9 (35.4)	3.1 (37.6)	6.1 (43.0)	10.1 (50.2)	15.0 (59.0)	20.1 (68.2)	23.7 (74.7)	23.2 (73.8)	19.2 (66.6)	13.7 (56.7)	8.4 (47.1)	3.9 (39.0)	12.4 (54.3)
Average precipitation mm (inches)	144 (5.7)	136 (5.4)	129 (5.1)	109 (4.3)	43 (1.7)	0 (0)	0 (0)	0 (0)	1 (0.0)	27 (1.1)	83 (3.3)	127 (5.0)	799 (31.6)

== Landmarks ==
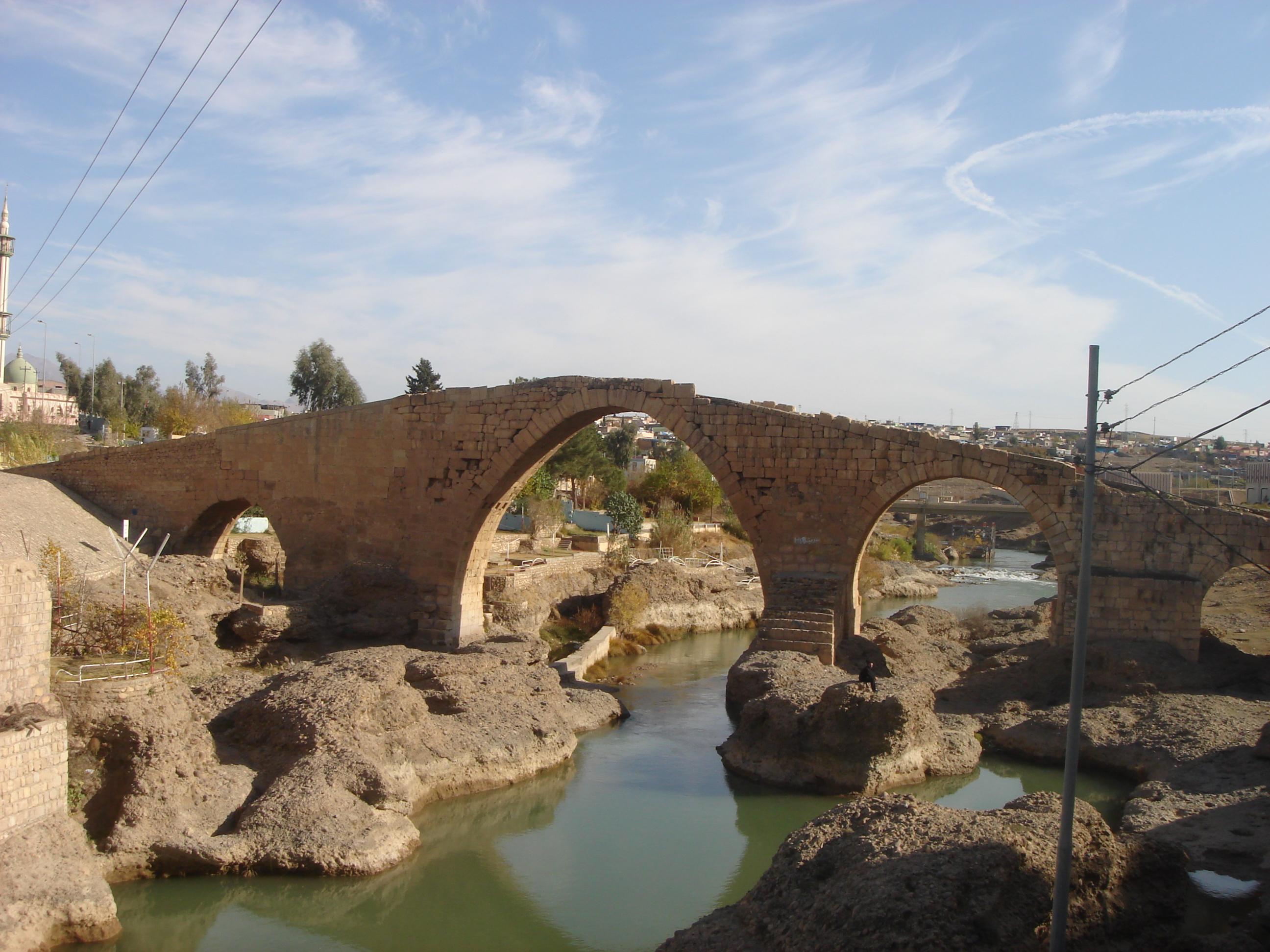
Delal Bridge

One of Zakho's famous landmarks is the Delal Bridge, made of stone.

Zakho Castle lies in the city centre on the western bank of the Khabur. It served as the governor's house in the reign of the Badinan Emirate and was enlarged by Prince Ali Khan. It was built on the ruins of an older castle. Today, only the castle's tower remains.

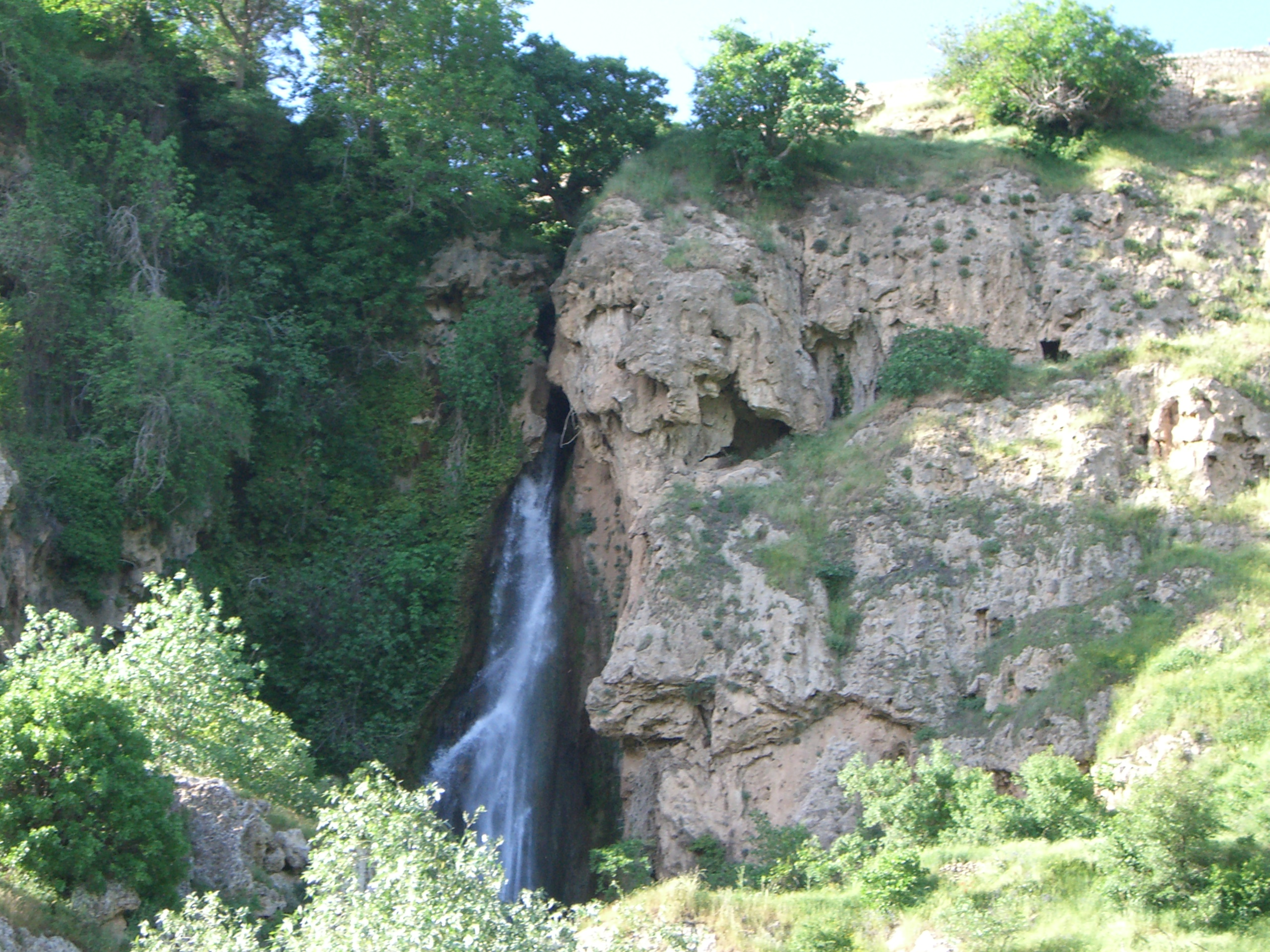
Sharansh waterfall

The Qubad Pasha Castle, in Zakho's cemetery, is hexagonal, with six windows and an entrance gate.

== Religion ==
=== Christianity ===
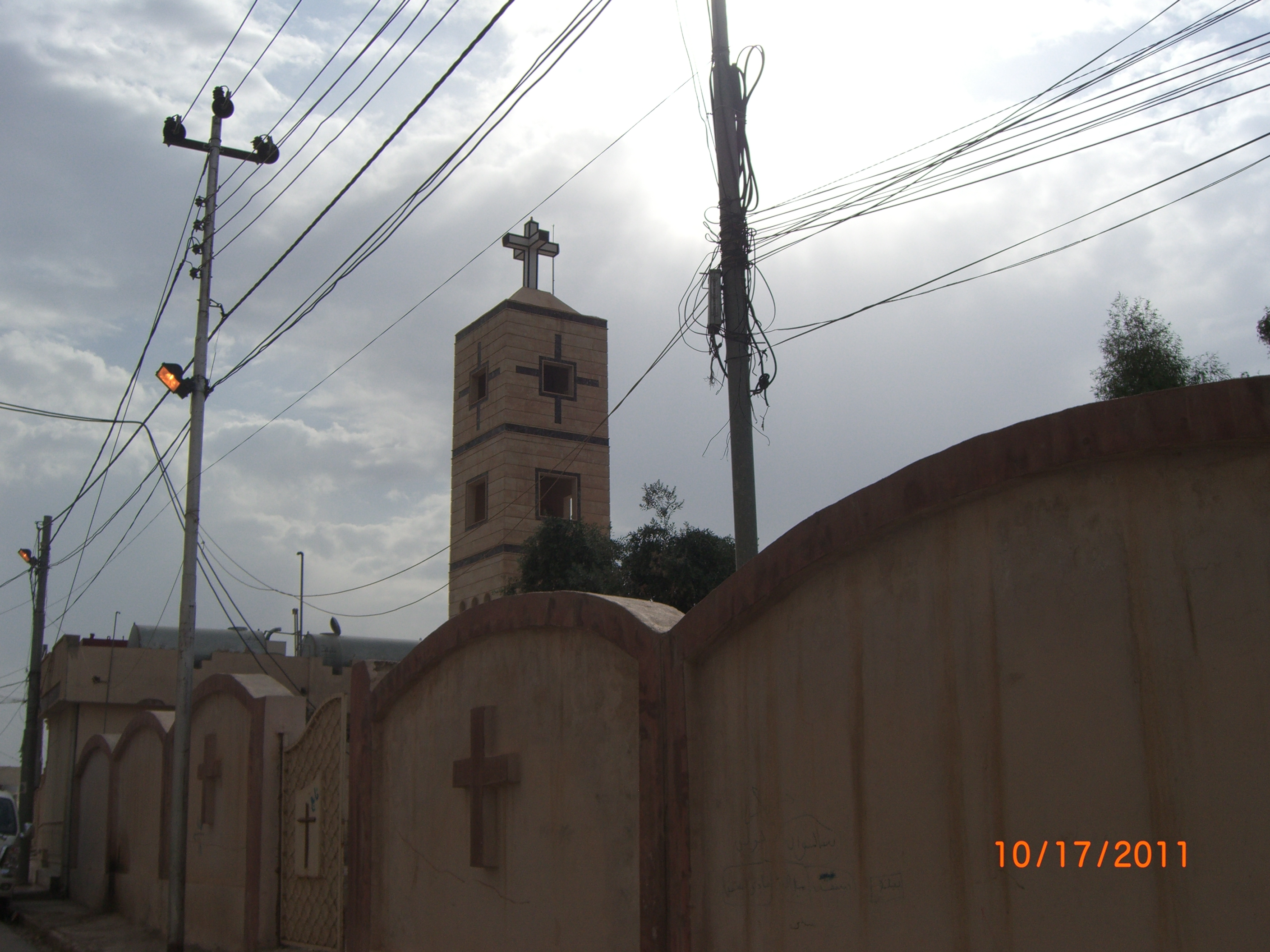
St. George Chaldean Cathedral in Zakho.

The city was the center of a large Chaldean Catholic diocese up until the middle of the nineteenth century, when it was divided into three dioceses: Amadia, Zakho, and Akra-Zehbar. The Armenians of Zakho established their community after the Armenian genocide, with the first Armenian church in the city being established in 1923.

=== Judaism ===
Zakho was formerly known for its synagogues and a large, ancient Jewish community. In the middle of the 19th century, Zakho became the chief spiritual center for the Jews of Kurdistan, and many sources refer to it as yerušalayim de-kurdistan 'the Jerusalem of Kurdistan.'

The banks of the nearby Khabur River are mentioned in the Bible as one of the places to which the Israelites were exiled (1 Chronicles, 5:26, 2 Kings 17:6, 2 Kings 18:11).

The Jews spoke the Jewish Neo-Aramaic dialect of Zakho and were also fluent in Kurmanji, the language spoken by non-Jewish Kurds.

Kurdish society was primarily a tribal one. The Jews of Zakho bore arms like Kurdish Muslims. There was an attack on the Jews in 1891, when one of the synagogues was burnt down. The troubles intensified in 1892.

Most of the Jews relocated to Israel in the 1950s. While the Jews of Zakho were among the least literate in the diaspora, they had a unique and rich oral tradition, known for its legends, epics and ballads, whose heroes came from both Jewish and Muslim traditions.

== Population displacements ==
In 2007, the UNHCR reported that there were still 10,000 internally displaced persons in the Zakho district as a result of the Iraq War.

== Sports ==
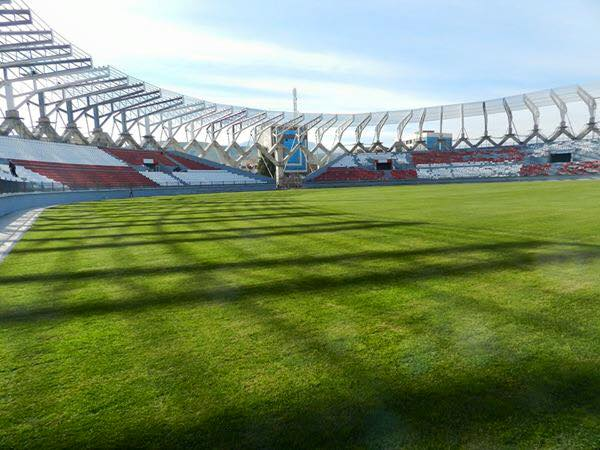
Football Stadium of Zakho

Zakho Football Club (Zakho FC) was founded in 1987. The sports club plays in the Iraq Stars League, where only the top 20 Iraqi football clubs play. Zakho FC has its own stadium with a capacity of 20,000 seats.

Zakho Basketball Club (Zakho SC) won the Kurdistan Basketball Super Cup and beat Duhok SC in Erbil.

== Notable people ==
- Saleh Yousefi (1918-1981), poet and politician
- Yona Sabar (b. 1938), Jewish scholar
- Yitzhak Mordechai (b. 1944), Israeli former general and politician
- Louis Raphaël I Sako (b. 1948), Chaldean Catholic Patriarch of Babylon
- Andraos Abouna (1949-2010), Chaldean Catholic bishop
- Walid Yunis Ahmad (?), television journalist
- Erdewan Zaxoyî (1957–1986), Kurdish singer
- Abu Abdullah al-Shafi'i, islamist militant
- Eyaz Zaxoyî (1960–1986), Kurdish singer
- Chiya Hamid Sharif (b. 1975), politician
- Shirin Hassani Ramazan (b. 1980), politician
- Barzan Tilli-Choli (b. 1982) Iraqi-Kurdish gangster
- Kassem Taher Saleh (b. 1993), politician
- Merchas Doski (b.1999), kurdish footballer
- Dadvan Yousuf (b. 2000), Kurdish entrepreture

== See also ==
- Assyrians in Iraq
- List of largest cities in Iraq
- Zakho (Chaldean Diocese)
- Zambil Frosh
- Yazidis in Iraq
- Zakho resort attack

== Sources ==
- Chabot, Jean-Baptiste (1902). Synodicon orientale ou recueil de synodes nestoriens (PDF). Paris: Imprimerie Nationale.
