= Aziz Tamoyan =

Yazidi politician (1933–2021)

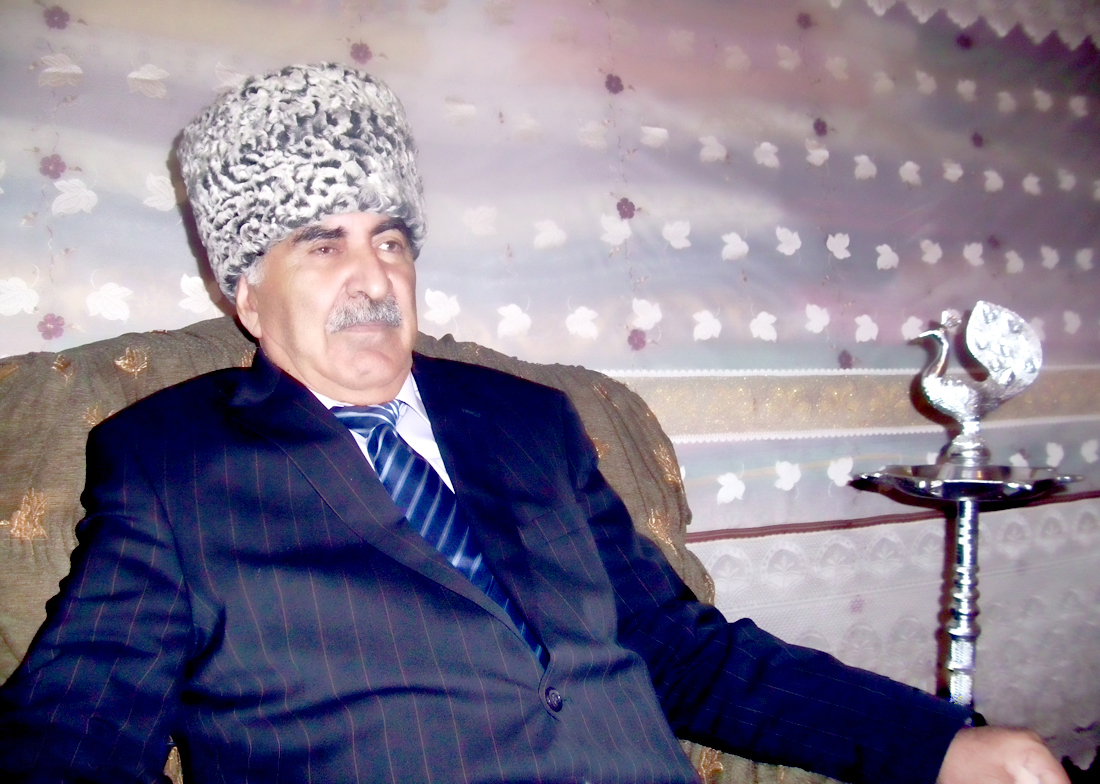
Aziz Tamoyan

Aziz Amari Tamoyan (Armenian: Ազիզ Ամարի Թամոյան, Kurdish: ئەزیز تامۆیان, romanized: Ezîz Tamoyan; July 1, 1933 in Zovuni, Armenia – January 2, 2021) was a Yazidi politician and the president of the Yezidi National Union in Armenia.

On September 30, 1989, he was elected chairman of the National Union of Yazidis of Armenia, and in 1997 he became chairman of the National Union of Yazidis of the World.

== See also ==
- Yazidis in Armenia
