= Yezidi New Year =

Yazidi festival

Yazidi New Year
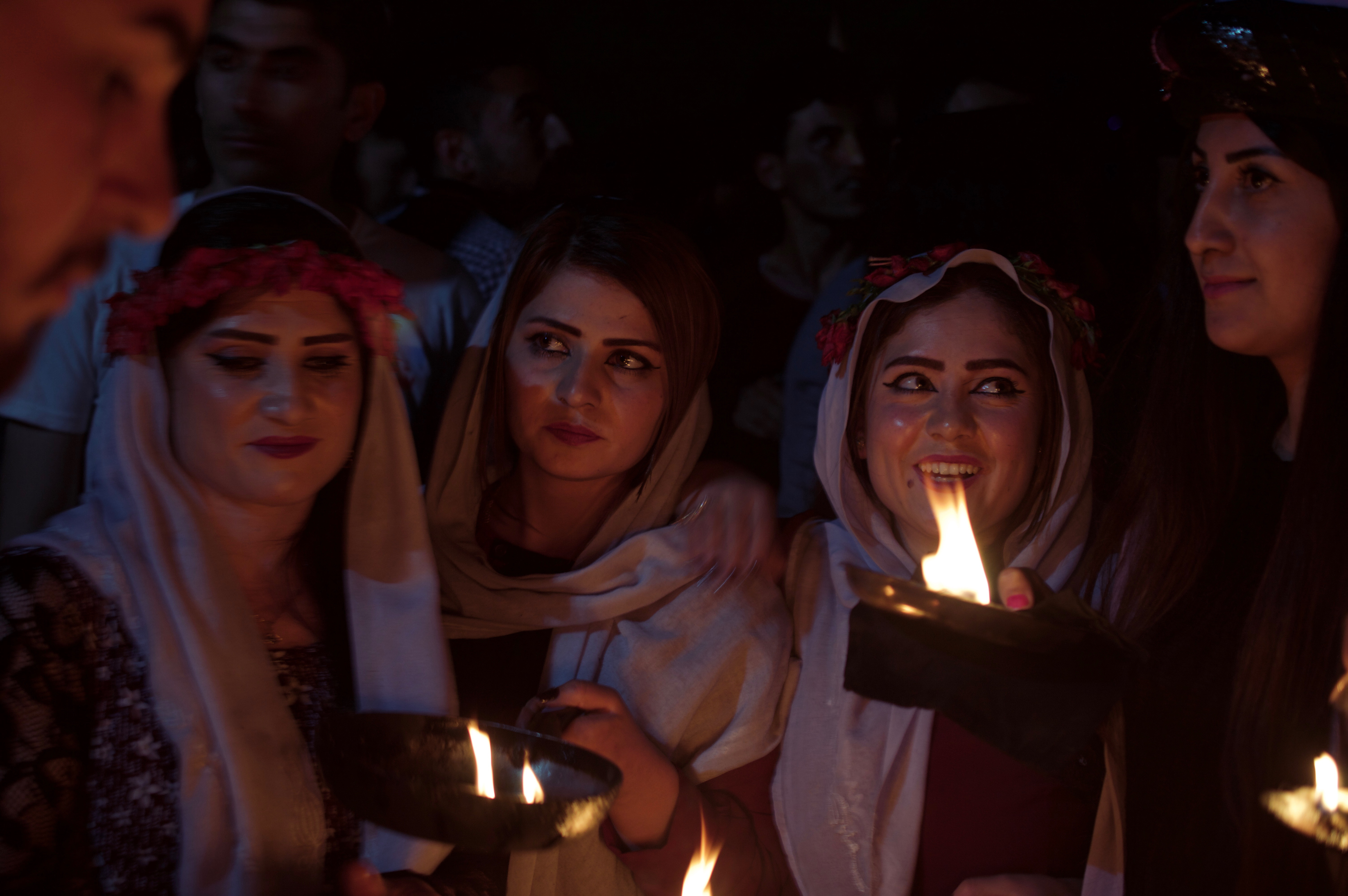
- Yazidi New Year festival at Lalish (18 April 2017) celebrating the start of the new year which begins the following day.
- Observed by: Yazidis
- Type: Religious
- Frequency: Annual

The Yazidi New Year (Sersal) is called Çarşema Sor ("Red Wednesday") or Çarşema Serê Nîsanê ("Wednesday at the beginning of April") in Kurmanji. It falls in spring, on the first Wednesday of the April and Nîsan months in the Julian and Seleucid calendars, i.e. the first Wednesday on or after 14 April according to the Gregorian calendar.

== Description ==
The celebrations start on the eve of Wednesday, i.e. Tuesday evening (Yazidis believe 24 hours of the day start at sunset), eggs are boiled and coloured, the festive sawuk bread is baked, the graves are visited to commemorate the dead and bring offerings and fruits for them. Yazidis also wear festive garments and visit nearby temples, in particular Lalish, where the sacred Zemzem spring, which runs in a dark cave, is located. Yazidis offer sacrifices on the entrance at the entrance to the cave and receive blessings. The hills surrounding Lalish are climbed, where they fasten colourful ribbons to the wishing trees. Red flowers are collected from the wilderness which some attach to their hair or turban and later use to decorate their houses with, oils are burnt and bonfires are lit at night. The people exchange gifts with close friends or neighbours.

The festive game hekkane is also played by all Yazidis, which involves egg tapping; the cracking of the egg is supposed to represent the bursting of the primordial White Pearl (i.e. the Big Bang) and beginning of life. A great cleaning is carried out on the temples and animals are sacrificed. In the evening, pilgrims gather in the inner courtyard of Lalish where the Baba Sheikh and other religious dignitaries are present. They wait until sunset for the priest bearing the sacred fire to emerge from the temple, from this fire, they all light the specially prepared wicks placed on mostly small stones, oil lamps and pans. The Baba Sheikh turns toward the temple's entrance and recites religious hymns together with other priests who are present. As it gets darker, the pilgrims relocate to the outer yard in front of the temple where the Qawwals, surrounded by the halo of a thousand of tiny flames and accompanied by the Moonlight, recite religious hymns with accompaniment of flutes and tambours. The crowds later surround the priests and dignitaries to shout the sacred names, in particular that of Tawûsê Melek, before departing home.

Before daybreak, a mixture of clay, broken shells of the coloured eggs, red flowers and curry softened with water is applied beside the doors or entrances of houses and sacred places. This is accompanied by reciting the Qewlê Çarşemê hymn.

The rest of the day is spent visiting neighbours, giving and receiving gifts, feasting and playing hekkane. Travelling is refrained from because this day is believed to be the most unlucky day of the year; this belief is also linked with Chaharshanbe Suri by Iranians. In Lalish, a basin with the water from the Zemzem spring is prepared and the head clergy, including Baba Sheikh, Baba Chawish, and the Peshimam, gather in the inner courtyard where the Sheikhan Sancak is brought in, unveiled and dismantled to be ritually washed with the sacred water by each of the clerics. The sancak is thus ready to be paraded around in the vicinity for the Tawûsgeran festival.

== Symbolism ==
2016 VOA report about Yazidis celebrating New Year in a refugee camp

The festival is considered to be a representation of the cosmogony, thus the celebrations, rituals and activities that are conducted during the festival, correspond to the cosmogonical stages. For example, the cleaning represents the state of indefiniteness, the visiting to the graves represents the Enzel stage, i.e. the state of immateriality. The egg represents the primordial White Pearl, thus, when the egg is cracked, it represents the bursting of the White Pearl, beginning of life and emergence of colors. The lit fires represent dispersion of light, the visit to Zemzem spring represents gushing of the infinite waters and the mixture of clay, water, eggshells and flowers represents the amalgamation of the elements which led to the creation of the material world. Lastly, the washing of the Sancak represents descent of Tawûsê Melek to earth.

"Hat çarşema sorê,
Nîsan xemilandibû bi xorê,
Ji batin da ye bi morê.
Hat çarşema sor û zerê,
Bihar xemilandibû ji kesk û sor û sipî û zerê,
Me pê xemilandin serederê."

(English: "The Red Wednesday has come,
Nîsan is adorned with the sun,
Blessed with concealment.
The Red and Yellow Wednesday has come,
The spring is adorned with green, red, white and yellow,
And we have decorated our door lintels with them")

— A passage from Qewlê Çarşemê

Yazidi weddings may not take place during this month as April is considered the month of fertility and the bride of the year (Bûka Sale).

== See also ==
- Chaharshanbe Suri
- Newroz as celebrated by Kurds
- List of religious holidays
