= Kurds in Azerbaijan =

Ethnic group

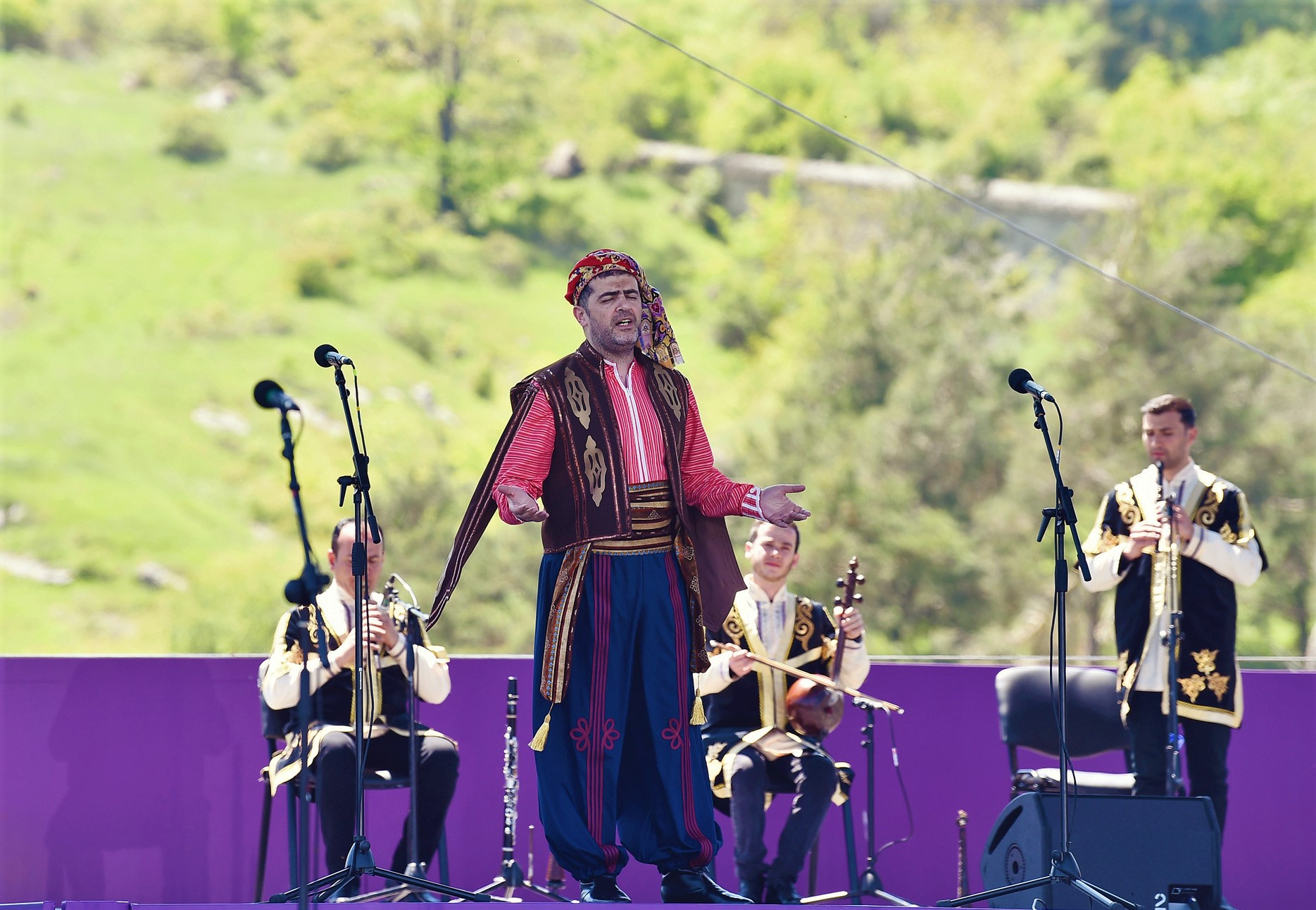
- Tunar Rahmanoghly singing Kurdish song "Rinda Min". Khari Bulbul Music Festival

Total population
- Official: 6,100; Estimate: 70,000

Regions with significant populations
- Lachin District, Kalbajar District, Qubadli District, Zangilan District, Sharur District, Babek District, Kangarli District

Languages
- Kurdish (Kurmanji), Azerbaijani

Religion
- Majority Shia Islam, Minority Yezidism

Related ethnic groups
- Other Iranian peoples, especially other Kurds

The Kurds in Azerbaijan form a part of the historically significant Kurdish population in the post-Soviet space. Kurds established a presence in the Caucasus with the establishment of the Kurdish Shaddadid dynasty in the 10th and 11th centuries, Some Kurdish tribes were recorded in Karabakh by the end of the sixteenth century. However, virtually the entire contemporary Kurdish population in the modern Azerbaijan descends from migrants from 19th-century Qajar Iran.

== History ==
=== Early history ===
According to Russian and later Soviet ethnographer Grigory Chursin, another wave of Kurdish immigration in western parts of modern Azerbaijan may have taken place in 1589, at the time of the Ottoman–Safavid War, when "victorious Safavid soldiers" chose to stay in the conquered lands. Safavids resettled Shi'a Kurds where borders of the historical regions of Karabakh and Zangezur met. In the eighteenth century, many Kurdish tribes had formed tribal unions with Azeris in Karabakh lowlands. Nineteenth-century Russian historian Peter Budkov mentioned that in 1728, groups of Kurds and Shahsevans engaged in semi-nomadic cattle-breeding in the Mughan plain applied for Russian citizenship.

In 1807, amidst the Russo-Persian War over the South Caucasus, a tribe chief by the name of Mehmed Sefi Sultan moved from Persian to the Karabakh khanate followed by 600 Kurdish families. By the second half of the nineteenth century, Kurds were found in large numbers in the uyezds of Zangezur, Javanshir and Jabrayil. In 1886, they constituted 4.68% of the population of the Elisabethpol Governorate. Small populations of Kurds were also found in the uyezds of Nakhchivan, Sharur-Daralagoz and Aresh. Mass migration of Kurds from Persia and to a lesser degree from the Ottoman Empire into mountainous regions of present-day Azerbaijan continued all throughout the nineteenth and early twentieth century, until 1920 when Azerbaijan became part of the Soviet Union. The Kurdish population of the South Caucasus was prone to internal immigration. In the 1920s, a number of Kurds from Azerbaijan relocated to Armenia where they settled mainly in the Azeri-populated regions, which led the Kurdish population of Azerbaijan to significantly decrease in numbers.

Common religion (unlike the majority of Kurds, Kurds of Azerbaijan are predominantly Shi'a Muslim like most Azeris) and shared elements of culture led to rapid assimilation of Azerbaijan's Kurdish population already by the end of the nineteenth century. Statistical data from 1886 shows that Kurds of Jabrayil, Arash and partly Javanshir spoke Azeri as a first language. According to the first Soviet census of 1926, only 3,100 (or 8.3%) of Azerbaijan's Kurdish population (which at the time numbered 37,200 people) spoke Kurdish.

A well-integrated community, Kurds were represented in the government of the shortly independent Democratic Republic of Azerbaijan in 1918–1920, among them Nurmammad bey Shahsuvarov who served as Minister of Education and Religious Affairs and Khosrov bey Sultanov, Minister of the Military and Governor General of Karabakh and Zangezur.

=== Red Kurdistan ===
After the establishment of the Soviet rule in Azerbaijan, the Central Executive Committee of the Azerbaijan SSR created in 1923 an administrative unit known as Red Kurdistan in the districts of Lachin, Qubadli and Zangilan, with its capital in Lachin. According to the 1926 census, 73% of its population was Kurdish and 26% was Azeri. In 1930 it was abolished and most remaining Kurds were progressively recategorized as Azerbaijani. In the 1930s, a traditional Kurdish puppet theatre kilim arasi in Aghjakand and a Kurdish Pedagogical College in Lachin still functioned. Soviet authorities deported most of the Kurdish population of Azerbaijan and Armenia to Kazakhstan in 1937, and Kurds of Georgia in 1944.

Kurds continued to assimilate into the dominant culture of the neighbouring Azeris. Historically mixed Azeri-Kurdish marriages were commonplace. Due to the Azerbaijani language being dominant and most Kurds in Azerbaijan being linguistically assimilated, the Kurdish language was rarely passed on to the children in such marriages.

=== Later Soviet period ===
Starting from 1961, when the First Iraqi–Kurdish War started, there were efforts by the deportees for the restoration of their rights - spearheaded by Mehmet Babayev; these proved to be futile.

During the perestroika era in the 1980s, there was a resurgence in the nationalist aspirations of Soviet Kurds, leading to the formation of the Yekbûn organization in 1989, which aimed to reestablish Kurdish autonomy. The government of the USSR under Gorbachev attempted to help the Kurds, but aspirations for an autonomous Kurdish state within the Soviet Union failed after the 1991 collapse of the USSR and significant hostility to the plan by Turkey.

=== Nagorno-Karabakh conflict and Kurdish Republic of Lachin ===
The First Nagorno-Karabakh War between Armenia and Azerbaijan spilled across the region of Nagorno-Karabakh into the traditionally Kurdish populated areas in both of these countries. In the late 1980s, up to 18,000 Kurds left Armenia for Azerbaijan. In 1992–1993, Armenian troops advanced into Kalbajar, Lachin, Qubadli and Zangilan, forcing the non-Armenian civilian population out. As much as 80% of the Kurdish population of those regions settled in IDP camps in Aghjabadi.

Nonetheless, in 1992, after the capture of Lachin by Armenian forces during the First Nagorno-Karabakh War, a new organization, the "Caucasian Kurdistan Freedom Movement", led by Wekîl Mustafayev, declared the establishment of the Kurdish Republic of Lachin on the former territory of Red Kurdistan. However, by then the vast majority of the Kurdish population had fled on account of the war, hence this attempt failed and the ephemeral state dissolved itself the same year. Mustafayev later took refuge in Italy. Lachin then came under the administration of the Armenian-backed Nagorno-Karabakh Republic.

As a result of the 2020 Nagorno-Karabakh war, Azerbaijan retook Kalbajar, Lachin, Qubadli and Zangilan. According to the 2020 Nagorno-Karabakh ceasefire agreement, internally displaced persons and refugees shall return to the territory of Nagorno-Karabakh and adjacent areas under the supervision of the United Nations High Commissioner for Refugees.

== Demographics ==
Estimates from the 1920s put the population of the Kurds in Azerbaijan at around 40 thousand. Estimates in the 1990s varied from as low as 10 thousand to as high as 200 thousand.

1926	1939	1959	1970	1979	1989	1999	2009
41,193	6,005	1,487	5,488	5,676	12,226	13,100	6,100

== Influential Kurds from Azerbaijan ==
- Mamed Iskenderov, chairman of the Presidium of the Azerbaijan Supreme Soviet
- Nadir Nadirov, professor, member of the Kazakhstan Academy of Science and one of the leaders of the Kurdish community in Kazakhstan
- Shamil Asgarov, poet and folklorist
- Vakil Mustafayev, former leader of short-lived Kurdish Republic of Lachin in today‘s western Azerbaijan
- Firudin Shamoyev, Azerbaijani soldier
- Kamil Nasibov, Azerbaijani soldier
- Vazir Orujov, Azerbaijani soldier
- Khosrow Mustafayev, Azerbaijani police officer and participant in the 1995 Azerbaijani coup d'état attempt

== See also ==
- Kurdish population
- Ethnic groups in Azerbaijan
  - Kurds in Armenia
  - Kurds in Georgia
  - Kurds in Iran
  - Kurds in Russia
  - Kurds in Turkey
- A Modern History of the Kurds by David McDowall
