= Vakil Mustafayev =

Soviet-Kurdish political leader and activist

- Born: 1938; Samarkand, Uzbek Soviet Socialist Republic
- Died: 19 April 2019 (aged 80–81); Brussels, Belgium
- Burial place: Erbil, Kurdistan Region
- Occupations: Politician, activist
- Known for: Leader of Kurdish Republic of Lachin

Vakil Mustafayev (Kurdish: Ԝәкил Мьстәфайев, romanized: Wekîl Mistefayêv; Russian: Вакил Мустафаев; 1938 – 19 April 2019) was a Soviet-Kurdish political leader and activist, best known for his role in establishing the Kurdish Republic of Lachin, an attempt to revive Red Kurdistan, an autonomous Kurdish region in the Soviet Union that dissolved in 1929.

== Biography ==
Vakil Mustafayev was born in Samarkand, Uzbekistan in 1938, to an Azerbaijani Kurdish family from Lachin that had been forcefully exiled to Uzbekistan. In 1981, he was sent to work in Azerbaijan and held a position in the internal affairs bodies. He was known as an agent of the Soviet KGB, nicknamed "Musto", and in the late 1980s, when the Armenian-Azerbaijani conflict began over Karabakh, he had been working as a deputy police chief in Şirvan. He married a Russian woman who served as a Soviet army officer.

Mustafayev sought to defend Kurdish cultural and political rights inside and outside the Soviet Union.

When the Nagorno-Karabakh conflict began, Mustafayev began the Kurdish separatist movement in Lachin, to rival the Armenian separatists who also claimed Lachin. He founded the Kurdish national movement called "Yekbûn" by contacting the Kurds of Central Asia, Iraq, Iran and Syria. After the occupation of Lachin in May 1992, about 50 Kurds, led by Mustafayev, were brought to this region by buses under the organization of the Yerevan municipality. On May 20, 1992, the same group declared a Kurdish republic in Lachin, and Mustafayev was elected as the prime minister. However, since the native Kurds of Lachin had been expelled by Armenians, the plan to create a Kurdish republic failed, and Mustafayev left Azerbaijan and went to Krasnodar and from there to Europe.

Mustafayev emphasized the preservation of Kurdish identity and worked towards unity among Kurds. Following the collapse of the Soviet Union, he moved to Belgium, where he continued his advocacy until his death in 2019. He was buried in Erbil, with political and cultural figures attending his funeral.

== See also ==
- Red Kurdistan
- Kurdish Republic of Lachin
