= Multiculturalism in Azerbaijan =

== Minor nations ==
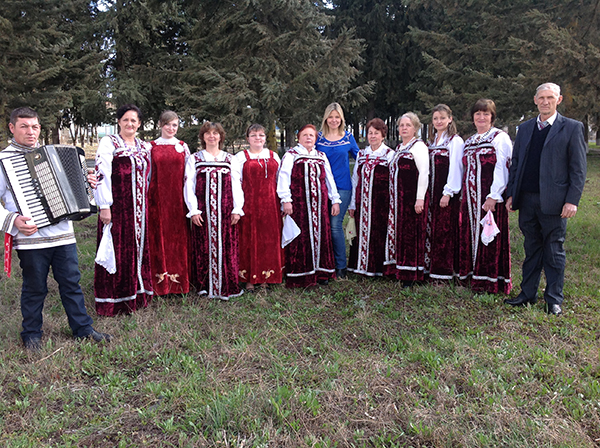
Ivanovka people in traditional attire

There are multiple places where minor ethnicities live in Azerbaijan, such as mountain Jews in Qırmızı Qəsəbə (Red town), Kurds in Sheylanli, the Molokan village of İvanovka, Udi people in Nij and Khinalugs. There are some ethnic minorities like Russians, Lezgians, Tats and Talysh and other minorities that are represented in the National Assembly.

== European communities ==
European ethnicities that immigrated to and lived in Azerbaijan during the 19th and early 20th centuries, following the Russian conquest of the Caucasus and the oil boom in the country brought about by industrialization, included Slavs (Russians, Ukrainians, Belarusians, Poles, Czechs, Slovaks, Bulgarians, Serbs), Germanics (Germans, Austrians, Swedes, Swiss, Dutch, English), Greeks, Latins (Moldovans, Romanians, French, Italians), Balts (Lithuanians, Latvians), and Finno-Ugrics (Estonians, Finns, Hungarians, Mordovians, Mari), with a total of over 20 different nationalities being represented in the region by the 1920s. Some European communities were land-poor peasants who lived in rural areas and involved themselves in agriculture, while others were urban dwellers engaging in industrial activities. Many Americans also resided in Azerbaijan during this time, as they were fascinated by Baku's oil boom and aware of the Nobel family’s entrepreneurial activity in the city.

== Qırmızı Qəsəbə (Krasnaya Sloboda) ==
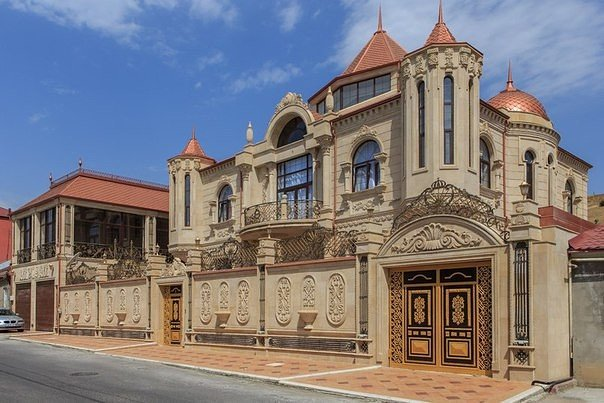
Qırmızı Qəsəbə ( Red town ) in Guba

Qırmızı Qəsəbə locals speak 3 languages: Judeo-Tat (spoken in daily conversations), Russian and Azerbaijani. Also, school books in their own language are prepared for them in Azerbaijan. Today, around 4 thousand Jews live in Qırmızı Qəsəbə. While the prevalent Jewish subgroup are the Mountain Jews, other subgroups that have historically inhabited this village include the Ashkenazi Jews, Sephardic Jews, Krymchaks, Kurdish Jews, and Georgian Jews.

== Governmental aspect ==
The State Committee for Work with Religious Organizations of Azerbaijan Republic ensures the Freedom of Religion of 21 non-Muslim religious groups.

Article 25 and 44 of the Constitution of Azerbaijan grants minorities the equality of rights and liberties of everyone, irrespective of race, religion, language, sex, financial position, occupation, membership in political parties, trade unions and other public organizations.

Ilham Aliyev announced that year 2016 is called "year of multiculturalism", thereafter Aliyev announced a listed of planned activities. To execute these the Baku International Multiculturalism Center was developed to improve execution and relations between nations, conferences, and cultures in different projects.

== See also ==
- Multiculturalism
- Religion in Azerbaijan
- History of the Jews in Azerbaijan
