= Ethnic groups in Kazakhstan =

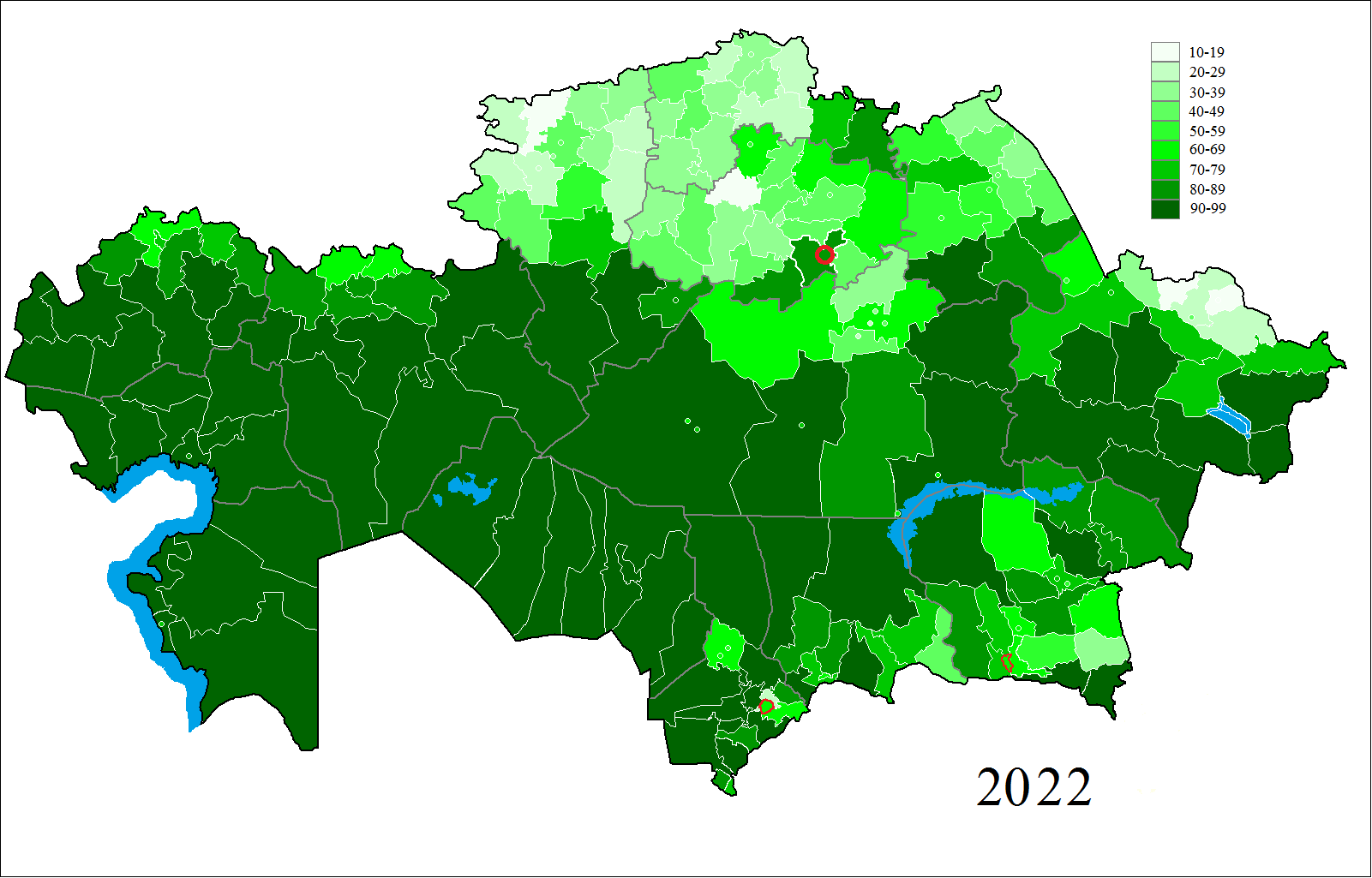
The share of Kazakhs in Kazakhstan by districts at the beginning of 2022

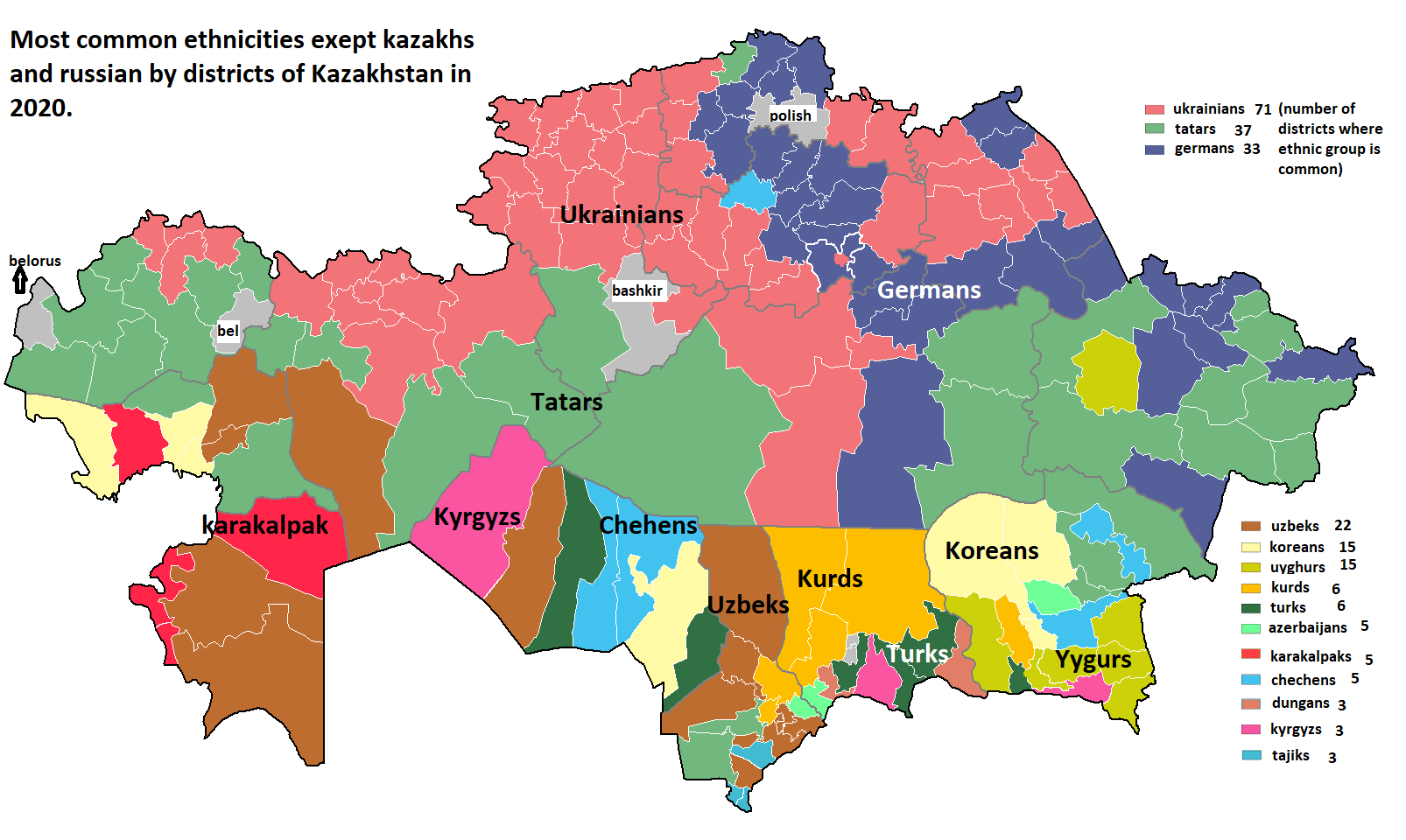
Most common ethnic groups by districts of Kazakhstan in 2020 except Kazakhs and Russians

Kazakhstan is a multi-ethnic country where the indigenous ethnic group, Kazakhs, comprise the majority of the population. As of 2026, ethnic Kazakhs are about 71.5% of the population and ethnic Russians are in the second place with 14.4%. These are the two dominant ethnic groups in the country with a wide array of other groups represented, including Uzbeks, Ukrainians, Uyghurs, Germans, Tatars, Azerbaijanis, Koreans, Turks, Dungans, Belarusians, Tajiks, and Kurds. Turkic peoples make up to 79% of the population while European and Caucasian peoples make up to 19%.

== History ==
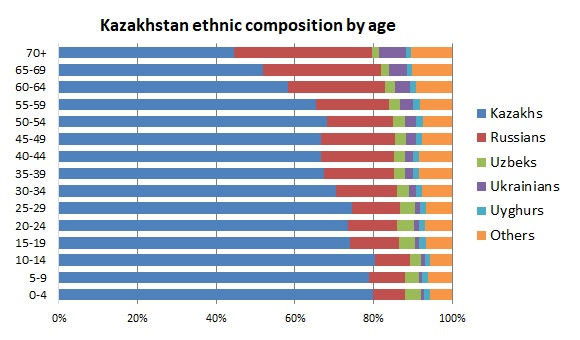
Ethnic composition by age, according to 2021 census

Kazakhstan's dominant ethnic group, the Kazakhs, traces its origin to the 15th century, when after disintegration of Golden Horde, number of Turkic and Turco-Mongol tribes united to establish the Kazakh Khanate. With a cohesive culture and a national identity, they constituted an absolute majority on the land until Russian colonization.
Russian advancement into the territory of Kazakhstan began in the late 18th century, when the Kazakhs nominally accepted Russian rule in exchange for protection against repeated attacks by the western Mongolian Kalmyks. In the 1890s, Russian peasants began to settle the fertile lands of northern Kazakhstan, causing many Kazakhs to move eastwards into Chinese territory in search of new grazing grounds.

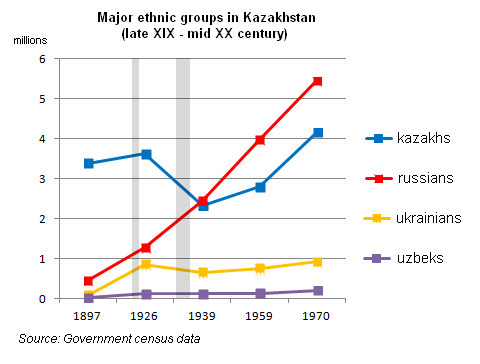
1897-1970 Major ethnic groups. Famines marked in grey.

=== Drastic changes during the 20th century ===
The famines of the 1920s and 1930s greatly influenced the ethnic composition of Kazakhstan. According to one estimate, up to 40% of Kazakhs either died of starvation or emigrated in the 1930s. Official government census data reports the contraction of Kazakh population from 3.6 million in 1926 to 2.3 million in 1939.

By the middle of the 20th century, practically all the ethnic communities which had ever been influenced by Russia were present in Kazakhstan. This diverse demography stemmed from the country's central location and its historical use by Russia as a place to send colonists, dissidents, and minority groups from its other frontiers. From the 1930s until the 1950s, both Russian opposition (and Russians who were "accused" of being part of the opposition) and certain minorities (especially Volga Germans, Greeks, Poles, Ukrainians, Crimean Tatars and Kalmyks) had been interned in labour camps, often merely due to their heritage or beliefs, mostly on collective orders by Joseph Stalin. This makes Kazakhstan one of the few places on Earth where normally-disparate Germanic, Greeks, Indo-Iranian, Koreans, Chechen, and Turkic groups live together in a rural setting and not as a result of modern immigration.

After the fall of the Soviet Union, the German population of Kazakhstan (Kasachstandeutsche) proceeded to emigrate en masse during the 1990s, as Germany was willing to repatriate these so-called Spätaussiedler, and many Russians went back to Russia. Also, many of the Greek took the chance to repatriate to Greece. Some groups have fewer good options for emigration, but because of the economic situation are also leaving at rates comparable to the rest of the former East bloc.

=== Table of historic ethnic composition of Kazakhstan ===
Table:

Censuses and official estimate of Kazakhstan (1897—2026)
Ethnicity	Year									
Ethnicity	1897 census		1926 census		1939 census		1959 census		1970 census	
Ethnicity	Population	%	Population	%	Population	%	Population	%	Population	%
Kazakhs	3,392,751	82.89%	3,627,612	58.52 %	2,327,625	37.84 %	2,794,966	30.02 %	4,161,164	32.39 %
Russians	454,402	11.1%	1,275,055	20.57 %	2,458,687	39.97 %	3,974,229	42.69 %	5,449,826	42.42 %
Uzbeks	29,564	0.72%	129,399	2.09 %	120,655	1.96 %	136,570	1.47 %	207,514	1.62 %
Uyghurs	55,815	1.36%	62,313	1.01 %	35,409	0.58 %	59,840	0.64 %	120,784	0.94 %
Ukrainians	79,573	1.94%	860,201	13.88 %	658,319	10.70 %	762,131	8.19 %	930,158	7.24 %
Tatars	55,984	1.37%	79,758	1.29 %	108,127	1.76 %	191,925	2.06 %	281,849	2.19 %
Germans	2,613	0.06%	51,094	0.82 %	92,571	1.50 %	659,751	7.09 %	839,649	6.53 %
Turks			68	0.00 %	523	0.01 %	9,916	0.11 %	18,397	0.14 %
Azerbaijanis					12,996	0.21 %	38,362	0.41 %	56,166	0.44 %
Koreans			42	0.00 %	96,457	1.57 %	74,019	0.80 %	78,078	0.61 %
Dungans	4,888	0.12%	8,455	0.14 %	7,415	0.12 %	9,980	0.11 %	17,283	0.13 %
Belarusians			25,584	0.41 %	31,614	0.51 %	107,463	1.15 %	197,592	1.54 %
Tajiks			7,666	0.12 %	11,229	0.18 %	8,075	0.09 %	7,166	0.06 %
Kurds					2,387	0.04 %	6,109	0.07 %	12,299	0.10 %
Chechens			3	0.00 %	2,639	0.04 %	130,232	1.40 %	34,492	0.27 %
Poles	1,254	0.03%	3,762	0.06 %	54,809	0.89 %	53,102	0.57 %	61,335	0.48 %
Kyrgyzs			10,200	0.16 %	5,033	0.08 %	6,810	0.07 %	9,612	0.07 %
Bashkirs	2,528	0.06%	841	0.01 %	3,450	0.06 %	8,742	0.09 %	21,134	0.16 %
Ingushs			3	0.00 %	322	0.01 %	47,867	0.51 %	18,356	0.14 %
Moldovans			2,855	0.05 %	2,992	0.05 %	14,844	0.16 %	25,711	0.20 %
Greeks			157	0.00 %	1,374	0.02 %	55,543	0.60 %	39,241	0.31 %
Mordvins	11,911	0.29%	27,244	0.44 %	25,334	0.41 %	25,499	0.27 %	34,129	0.27 %
Chuvashs			2,267	0.04 %	6,590	0.11 %	11,255	0.12 %	22,690	0.18 %
Jews	1,651	0.04%	4,499	0.07 %	19,240	0.31 %	28,048	0.30 %	26,954	0.21 %
Others			30,591	0.49 %	70,342	1.14 %	101,379	1.09 %	136,606	1.06 %
total	4,092,934	100%	6,198,469	100%	6,151,102	100%	9,309,847	100%	12,848,573	100%

Ethnicity	Year											
Ethnicity	1979 census		1989 census		1999 census		2009 census		2021 census		2026 estimate	
Ethnicity	Population	%	Population	%	Population	%	Population	%	Population	%	Population	%
Kazakhs	5,289,349	36.02 %	6,534,616	39.69 %	7,985,039	53.40 %	10,096,763	63.07 %	13,497,891	70.35 %	14,664,202	71,53 %
Russians	5,991,205	40.80 %	6,227,549	37.82 %	4,479,620	29.96 %	3,793,764	23.70 %	2,981,946	15.54 %	2,943,022	14,36 %
Uzbeks	263,295	1.79 %	332,017	2.02 %	370,663	2.48 %	456,997	2.85 %	614,047	3.20 %	695,557	3,39 %
Ukrainians	897,964	6.12 %	896,240	5.44 %	547,052	3.66 %	333,031	2.08 %	387,327	2.02 %	367,547	1,79 %
Uyghurs	147,943	1.01 %	185,301	1.13 %	210,365	1.41 %	224,713	1.40 %	290,337	1.51 %	309,164	1,51 %
Germans	900,207	6.13 %	957,518	5.82 %	353,441	2.36 %	178,409	1.11 %	226,092	1.18 %	222,890	1,09 %
Tatars	312,626	2.13 %	327,982	1.99 %	248,954	1.66 %	204,229	1.28 %	218,653	1.14 %	218,361	1,07 %
Azerbaijanis	73,345	0.50 %	90,083	0.55 %	78,295	0.52 %	85,292	0.53 %	145,615	0.76 %	157,568	0,77 %
Koreans	91,984	0.63 %	103,315	0.63 %	99,665	0.67 %	100,385	0.63 %	118,450	0.62 %	120,821	0,59 %
Turks	25,820	0.18 %	49,567	0.30 %	75,900	0.51 %	97,015	0.61 %	85,478	0.45 %	93,234	0,45 %
Dungans	22,491	0.15 %	30,165	0.18 %	36,945	0.25 %	51,944	0.32 %	78,817	0.42 %	88,165	0,43 %
Belarusians	181,491	1.24 %	182,601	1.11 %	111,927	0.75 %	66,476	0.42 %	76,484	0.40 %	73,788	0,36 %
Tajiks	19,293	0.13 %	25,514	0.15 %	25,657	0.17 %	36,277	0.23 %	49,827	0.26 %	61,307	0,30 %
Kurds	17,692	0.12 %	25,425	0.15 %	32,764	0.22 %	38,325	0.24 %	47,880	0.25 %	52,077	0,25 %
Kyrgyzs	9,352	0.06 %	13,718	0.08 %	10,925	0.07 %	23,274	0.15 %	34,184	0.18 %	41,459	0,20 %
Chechens	38,256	0.26 %	49,507	0.30 %	31,799	0.21 %	31,431	0.20 %	33,557	0.17 %	35,436	0,17 %
Poles	61,136	0.42 %	59,956	0.36 %	47,297	0.32 %	34,057	0.21 %	35,319	0.18 %	33,928	0,17 %
Bashkirs	32,499	0.22 %	41,847	0.25 %	23,224	0.16 %	17,263	0.11 %	19,834	0.10 %	20,229	0,10 %
Ingushs	18,337	0.12 %	19,914	0.12 %	16,893	0.11 %	15,120	0.09 %	17,509	0.09 %	18,187	0,09 %
Moldovans	30,256	0.21 %	33,098	0.20 %	19,458	0.13 %	14,245	0.09 %	16,989	0.09 %	17,107	0,08 %
Greeks	49,930	0.34 %	46,746	0.28 %	12,703	0.08 %	8,846	0.06 %	11,890	0.06 %	12,065	0,06 %
Mordvins	31,424	0.21 %	30,036	0.18 %	16,147	0.11 %	8,013	0.05 %	9,954	0.05 %	9,392	0,05 %
Chuvashs	22,310	0.15 %	22,305	0.14 %	11,851	0.08 %	7,301	0.05 %	8,329	0.04 %	8,056	0,04 %
Jews	22,762	0.16 %	18,492	0.11 %	6,743	0.05 %	3,485	0.02 %	4,064	0.02 %	4,067	0.02 %
Others	142,668	0.97 %	174,670	1.06 %	99,799	0.67 %	82,942	0.52 %	175,542	0.91 %	232,193	1.13 %
total	14,684,283	100%	16,464,464	100%	14,953,126	100%	16,009,597	100%	19,186,015	100%	20,499,822	100%

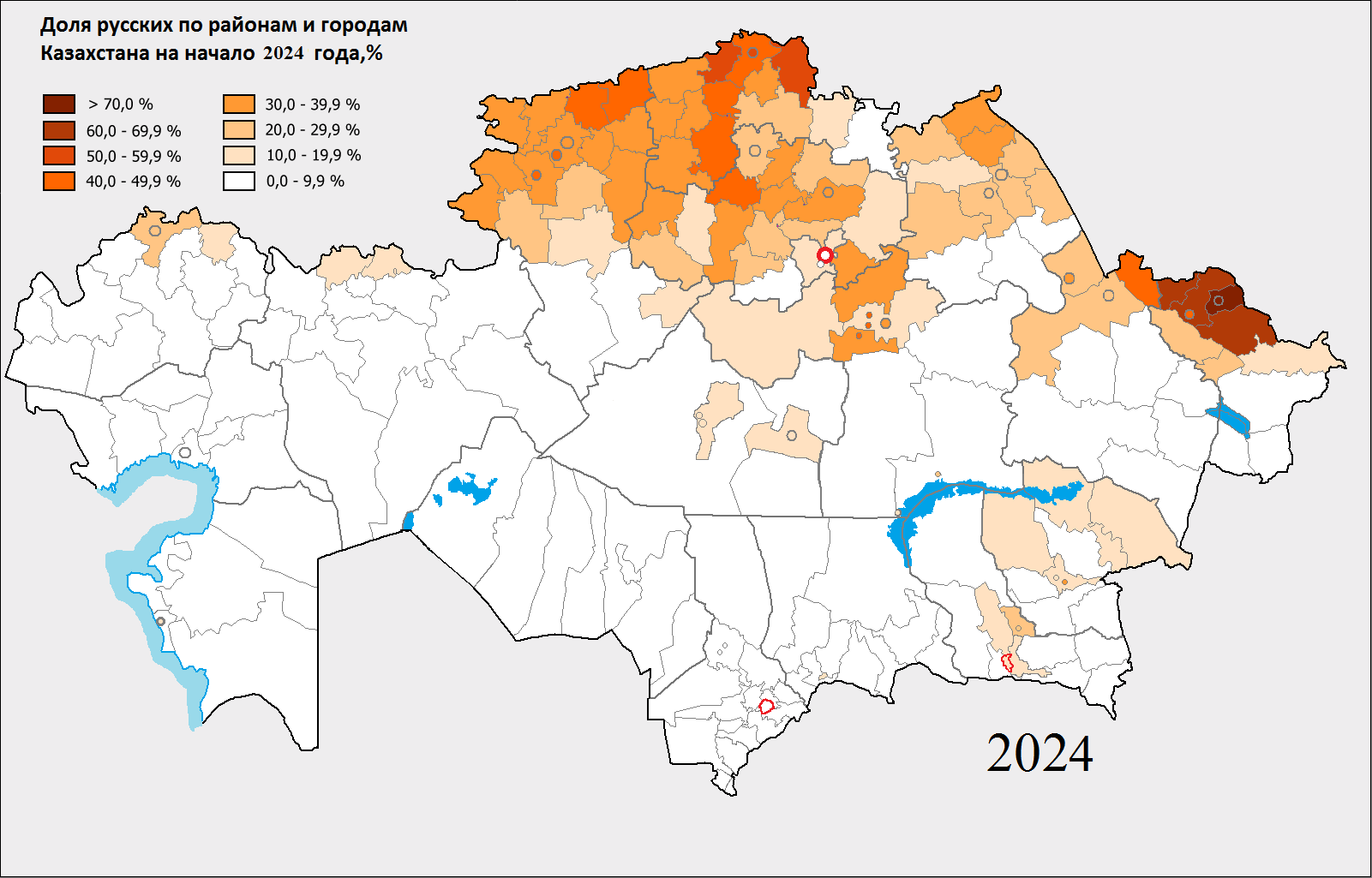
The share Russians by districts and cities of regional and republican subordination Kazakhstan in 2021

== Demographic data ==
=== Vital statistics ===
As explained above, the Slavic groups have been declining ever since the 1960s, due to low birth rates and high death rates. Germans are characterized by very high birth rates, but it is mostly due to the high proportion of rural population and the presence of conservative religious factions like Mennonites and Evangelical Lutherans among them.

Table: Demographic characteristics of various ethnic groups of Kazakhstan

Ethnic Group	Births			Deaths			Natural Growth			Birth Rate			Death Rate			Natural Growth		
	1999	2007	2008	1999	2007	2008	1999	2007	2008	1999	2007	2008	1999	2007	2008	1999	2007	2008
Total	217,578	321,963	356,575	147,416	158,297	152,706	70,162	163,666	203,869	14.57	20.79	22.75	9.87	10.22	9.74	0.47%	1.06%	1.30%
Kazakh	142,363	227,002	254,402	52,337	61,639	61,397	90,026	165,363	193,005	17.77	24.73	27.06	6.62	6.82	6.63	1.12%	1.79%	2.04%
Russian	39,215	46,667	49,134	62,130	62,151	58,586	-22,915	-15,484	-9,452	8.84	11.94	12.68	14.28	16.30	15.35	-0.54%	-0.44%	-0.27%
Uzbek	9,534	13,398	15,047	2,224	2,560	2,828	7,310	10,838	12,219	25.54	30.22	33.02	6.04	5.91	6.30	1.95%	2.43%	2.67%
Ukrainian	5,156	4,936	5,267	11,426	11,139	10,506	-6,270	-6,203	-5,239	9.56	11.37	12.37	21.55	26.33	25.06	-1.20%	-1.50%	-1.27%
Uyghur	3,529	5,424	6,054	1,187	1,433	1,495	2,342	3,991	4,559	16.72	23.19	25.34	5.70	6.12	6.35	1.10%	1.71%	1.90%
Tatar	2,398	3,143	3,375	3,363	3,668	3,398	-965	-525	-23	9.70	13.87	14.90	13.88	16.62	15.23	1.70%	-0.28%	-0.03%
German	4,765	4,267	4,810	3,524	2,606	2,585	1,241	1,661	2,225	13.97	19.28	21.81	10.49	12.06	11.90	0.35%	0.72%	0.99%
Others	10,411	15,889	17,424	8,651	9,283	9,168	1,760	6,606	8,256	13.79	20.45	22.23	11.66	12.19	11.87	0.21%	0.83%	1.04%
Unknown	207	1,237	1,062	2,574	3,818	2,743	-2,367	-2,581	-1,681	NA	NA	NA	NA	NA	NA	NA	NA	NA

=== Inter-ethnic marriages ===
Most of the inter-ethnic marriages in Kazakhstan has been between various Slavic or Germanic groups (Russian – Ukrainian, German – Ukrainian, Russian – Polish or German – Russian). Inter-marriages between Turkic and European ethnic groups are increasing; however, as of 2008, they are still quite rare.

Table: Number of individuals married outside their ethnic group

Ethnic Group	Males			Females		
	1999	2007	2008	1999	2007	2008
Total	18,402	26,632	24,243	18,402	26,632	24,243
Kazakh	2,199	4,981	4,785	1,542	4,062	3,874
Russian	5,957	7,795	6,991	7,431	9,714	8,544
Uzbek	240	714	657	200	600	537
Ukrainian	2,717	3,070	2,555	2,541	2,858	2,466
Uighur	269	658	655	224	530	525
Tatar	948	1,682	1,425	938	1,651	1,413
German	2,844	2,365	2,048	3,137	2,566	2,270
Other	3,180	5,351	4,426	2,313	4,610	4,010
Unknown	48	16	701	76	41	604

=== Mechanical population movement ===
Slavic and Germanic groups have been emigrating en masse since the 1960s, and the movement accelerated during the 1990s after the breakup of the Soviet Union. This has resulted in the reduction of the proportion of European ethnic groups in the population by more than half. More than 50% of the European Soviet ethnic groups have left Kazakhstan since 1989, and just 15% of the pre-1989 ethnic German population remains now in the country.

Most of the immigration has been directed towards Russia, but small numbers have been immigrating to Ukraine, Belarus and Armenia also. Before the German authorities stopped the repatriation of ethnic Germans and their non-German relatives, Germany was one of the most favored destination for all the ethnic groups. It is estimated that close to half of the 4.5 million Soviet Germans and their Slavic kin who now live in Germany are originally from Kazakhstan. Currently on average close to 2,000 ethnic Germans emigrate from Kazakhstan to ethnic German dominated areas in Russia such as Azovsky Nemetsky National District (Deutsche Nationalkreis Asowo) in Omsk Oblast and Nemetsky National District (Nationalkreis Halbstadt) in Altai Krai. Also, out of the 1.2 million Russian speaking Jews and Slavs who live in Israel, a significant portion is from Kazakhstan.

On the other hand, ethnic Kazakhs and Uzbeks have been immigrating in large numbers to Kazakhstan ever since the collapse of the USSR. These immigrants come not only from the southern Central Asian states such as Uzbekistan and Tajikistan, but also from the Kazakh dominated areas in Xinjiang and Mongolia. The Kazakh government is actively encouraging the settlement of these compatriots (known as Oralman) in Slavic dominated North and East Kazakhstan as well as the German dominated Karaganda Region, in order to dilute the minority populations there. There is also a low intensity immigration of ethnic Slavs from the less tolerant neighboring nations like Uzbekistan and Turkmenistan into Kazakhstan. An estimated 400,000 Uzbeks have migrated to Kazakhstan in recent years.

Table: Data on immigration in Kazakhstan

Ethnic Group	Kazakhstan								
	Immigrants			Emigrants			Net Immigration		
	1999	2007	2008	1999	2007	2008	1999	2007	2008
Total	41,320	53,397	46,404	164,947	42,435	45,287	-123,627	10,962	1,117
Kazakh	10,909	41,763	35,081	8,258	2,269	2,281	2,651	39,494	32,800
Russian	20,076	6,658	6,268	91,489	29,492	31,631	-71,413	-22,834	-25,363
Uzbek	1,028	446	439	962	101	137	66	345	302
Ukrainian	2,526	601	643	15,315	3,433	3,676	-12,789	-2,832	-3,033
Uighur	95	84	111	99	40	36	-4	44	75
Tatar	1,129	476	433	3,971	995	1,034	-2,842	-519	-601
German	1,417	517	525	32,921	2,991	3,146	-31,504	-2,474	-2,621
Other	4,140	2,852	2,904	11,932	3,114	3,346	-7,792	-262	-442
	CIS Nations								
	Immigrants			Emigrants			Net Immigration		
	1999	2007	2008	1999	2007	2008	1999	2007	2008
Total	39,461	42,613	31,425	120,240	39,767	42,908	-80,779	2,846	-11,483
Kazakh	19,796	32,110	21,222	7,689	2,082	2,120	2,432	30,028	19,102
Russian	19,796	6,308	6,033	81,020	28,657	30,775	-61,224	-22,349	-24,742
Uzbek	1,020	441	435	921	95	126	99	346	309
Ukrainian	2,488	556	600	13,182	3,289	3,532	-10,694	-2,733	-2,932
Uighur	94	73	99	78	29	31	16	44	68
Tatar	1,124	465	427	3,714	981	1,002	-2,590	-516	-575
German	1,119	259	253	4,164	1,874	2,250	-3,045	-1,615	-1,997
Other	3,699	2,401	2,356	9,472	2,760	3,072	-5,773	-359	-716
	Non-CIS Nations								
	Immigrants			Emigrants			Net Immigration		
	1999	2007	2008	1999	2007	2008	1999	2007	2008
Total	1,859	10,784	14,979	44,707	2,668	2,379	-42,848	8,116	12,600
Kazakh	788	9,653	13,859	569	187	161	219	9,466	13,698
Russian	280	350	235	10,469	835	856	-10,189	-485	-621
Uzbek	8	5	4	41	6	11	-33	-1	-7
Ukrainian	38	45	43	2,133	144	144	-2,095	-99	-101
Uyghur	1	11	12	21	11	5	-20	0	7
Tatar	5	11	6	257	14	32	-252	-3	-26
German	298	258	272	28,757	1,117	896	-28,459	-859	-624
Other	441	451	548	2,460	354	274	-2,019	97	274

== Religion ==
Religion by ethnicity as of 2021 census:

Ethnic Group	Islam	Christianity	Judaism	Buddhism	Other	No Religion	Not Stated
Kazakhs	89.21%	0.34%	0.02%	0.01%	0.09%	1.08%	9.25%
Russians	1.96%	85.52%	0.05%	0.03%	0.23%	4.73%	7.48%
Uzbeks	77.76%	0.15%	0.01%	0.00%	0.03%	1.65%	20.40%
Ukrainians	2.44%	78.34%	0.09%	0.02%	0.20%	6.00%	12.93%
Uyghurs	71.87%	0.21%	0.02%	0.01%	0.06%	4.46%	23.37%
Germans	2.82%	77.30%	0.04%	0.02%	0.39%	6.20%	13.24%
Tatars	53.03%	24.09%	0.04%	0.03%	0.34%	6.38%	16.09%
Azerbaijanis	67.00%	0.73%	0.01%	0.01%	0.07%	4.85%	27.33%
Koreans	18.72%	35.75%	0.14%	10.72%	0.52%	16.44%	17.71%
Turks	69.90%	0.13%	0.01%	0.00%	0.02%	4.54%	25.39%
Dungans	71.32%	0.07%	0.01%	0.01%	0.03%	4.29%	24.27%
Belarusians	2.87%	76.93%	0.05%	0.02%	0.18%	5.08%	14.87%
Tajiks	72.91%	0.32%	0.00%	0.00%	0.02%	4.14%	22.62%
Kurds	68.05%	0.18%	0.00%	0.01%	0.04%	5.05%	26.67%
Kyrgyz	71.86%	0.20%	0.00%	0.01%	0.05%	4.94%	22.94%
Chechens	67.88%	1.26%	0.04%	0.01%	0.04%	5.41%	25.37%
Poles	2.14%	78.03%	0.07%	0.03%	0.24%	3.44%	16.05%
Others	9.26%	14.59%	0.97%	0.25%	0.23%	9.05%	65.65%
Total	69.31%	17.19%	0.04%	0.08%	0.12%	2.25%	11.01%

== See also ==
- Demographics of Kazakhstan
- Assembly of People of Kazakhstan
- Russians in Kazakhstan
- Ukrainians in Kazakhstan
- Germans in Kazakhstan
- Poles in Kazakhstan
- Greeks in Kazakhstan
- Koreans in Kazakhstan
- Uyghurs in Kazakhstan
- Chinese in Kazakhstan
- Turks in Kazakhstan
- Kurds in Kazakhstan
- Armenians in Kazakhstan
- Azerbaijanis in Kazakhstan
- Tatars of Kazakhstan
- Bulgarians in Kazakhstan
- Romanians in Kazakhstan
