= Kurds in Kazakhstan =

Kurdish people citizen of Kazakhstan

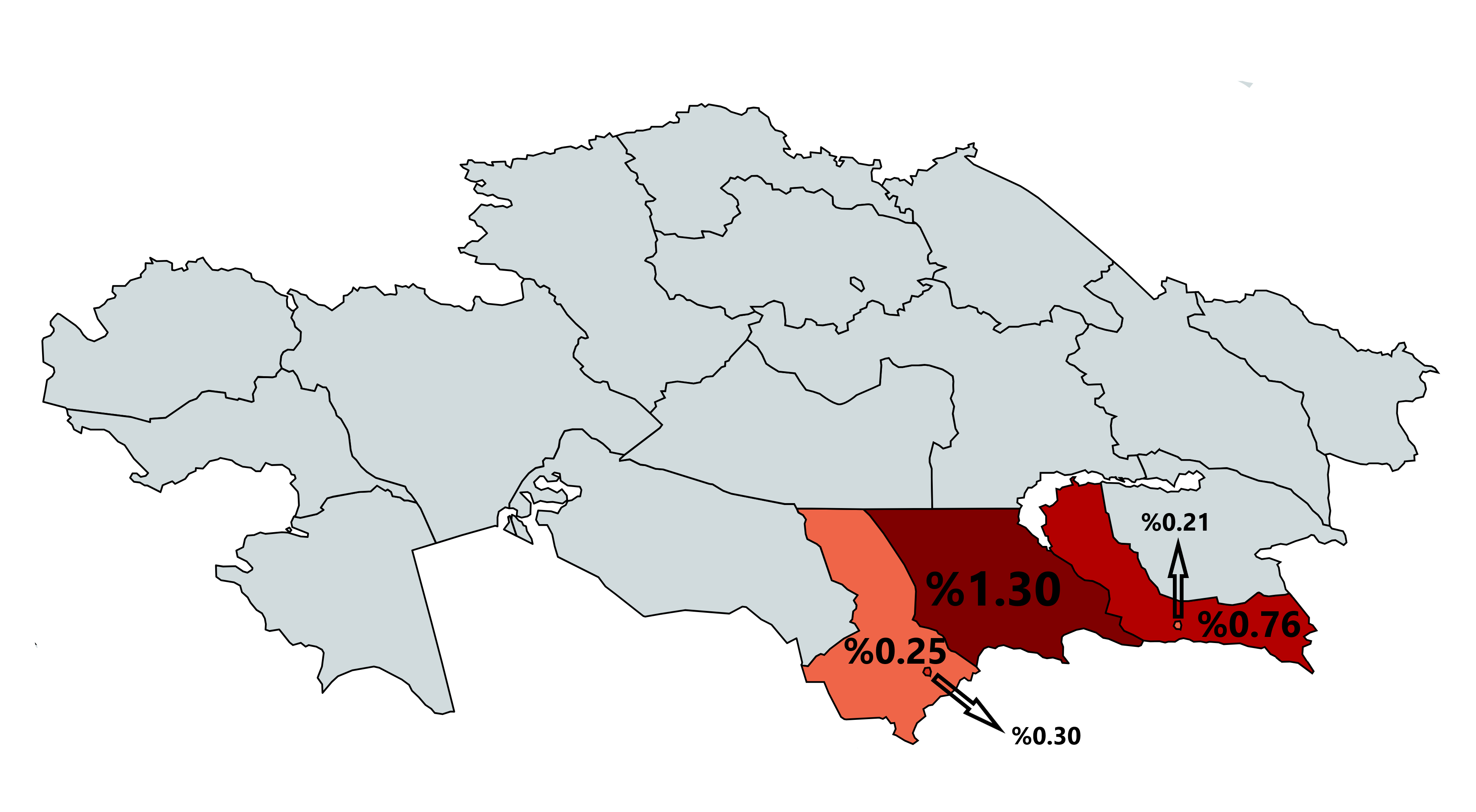
- Distrubtion of Kurds in Kazakhstan

Total population
- 48,642

Regions with significant populations
- Almaty Province, Jambyl Province, South Kazakhstan Province

Languages
- Kurdish (Kurmanji), Kazakh, Russian

Religion
- Overwhelmingly Islam

Related ethnic groups
- Other Kurds, especially Russian and Caucasian Kurds

Kurds in Kazakhstan (Kurdish: Kurdên Qazaxistanê, Кӧрдэн Ԛазахьстанэ; Kazakh: Қазақстан күрдтері, romanized: Qazaqstan kürdterı) form a part of the historically significant Kurdish population in the post-Soviet space, and encompass people born in or residing in Kazakhstan who are of Kurdish origin. According to the most recent Kazakh census in 2011, the Kurdish population is 38,325 or 0.2% of the population, but Vice President of the Kurdish Association of Kazakhstan, Malikshah Gasanov numbers the population up to 46,000, because many Kurds list themselves as Turks and Azeris. Other sources predict this number to be higher, counting up to 60,000 Kurds in Kazakhstan. During the Soviet era, most of the Kurdish population in the Kazakh SSR were deported there by Joseph Stalin from the Armenian, Azerbaijan and Georgian Soviet republics. Years later, Kurds immigrated to Kazakhstan from the neighbouring countries, Uzbekistan and Kyrgyzstan.

In cities with a substantial Kurdish population, Kurdish literature and Kurdish language is taught in the primary and secondary schools. In the village of Kashkabulak, Kurdish students can study Kurdish through 12th grade. And since 1990, Kurds also have had their own newspaper, the Kurdistan newspaper.

Religion among Kazakh Kurds
1. Islam (98.3%)
2. Christianity (0.52%)
3. Atheist and non-religious (0.70%)
4. Other and undeclared (0.39%)
5. Judaism (0.02%)
6. Buddhism (0.01%)
Mother tongue among Kazakh Kurds
1. Kurdish (88.7%)
2. Other languages (11.3%)

== Deportation and immigration ==
Kurds were deported twice to Central Asia from Caucasus. The first deportation occurred in 1937 where Stalin deported Kurds from Nakhchivan and the second deportation occurred in 1944 in Georgia. Stalin feared a Turkish invasion and he saw Kurds as unreliable, even though many Kurds served in the Soviet military. Many of them died during the deportations.

After the Osh riots and the riots in Fergana Valley between Kyrgyzs and Uzbeks, many Kurds moved to Kazakhstan.

== Population by year ==
Number of Kurds in Kazakhstan per official statistics:

Year	Population
1970	12,313
1979	17,692
1989	25,371
1999	32,764 (census)
2006	37,312
2007	38,030
2008	38,849
2009	39,660 (annual statistics) 38,325 (census)
2010	40,442
2011	39,772
2012	40,626
2013	—
2014	42,312
2015	43,119
2016	43,974
2017	44,768
2018	45,551
2019	46,348
2020	47,153
2021	47,948
2022	48,642

== See also ==
- Nadir Nadirov
- Kurdish population
- Ethnic groups in Kazakhstan
