= Nadirov =

Nadirov is a surname. Notable people with the surname include:

- Nadir Nadirov (1932–2021), Kurdish engineer
- Vüqar Nadirov (born 1987), Azerbaijani footballer
