= Sheylanli (tribe) =

Kurdish tribe

Sheylanli tribe (Kurdish: شیلانلی) is a Kurdish tribe who lived in the Sheylanli village, Lachin, until it was occupied by Armenian troops. Due to the war, the Sheylanlis fled to Aghjabadi Rayon, Azerbaijan. They speak the Kurmanji dialect of the Kurdish Language.

This tribe is considered to be one of the 24 Kurdish tribes those were moved from Iran to Karabakh and Zangezur by Shah Abbas I of Iran in the 16th century to fortify the borders of the Safavid Empire. Tatiana Fyodorovna Aristova gives some Sheylanli Kurdish family names such as Asadlar, Ismaillar, Nabilar, and Khudular in the book Kurdy Zakavkazia. The author mentions Sheylanli, Zerty, and Minkend among the poorest Kurdish communities of Azerbaijan in Lachin.

== Tribal Kurdish population in Lachin region ==
In the 1920s, the Kurdish community in Azerbaijan was considerably diminished, when many of them moved to Armenia where Kurdish villages were created. About the same time Azerbaijan's Kurds had their own region called Red Kurdistan in the Lachin region, which was to the West of Karabakh. In fact, Lachin with the principal towns Kalbajar, Kubatli and Zangelan and the administrative sub-divisions of Karakushlak, Koturli, Murad-Khanli and Kurd-Haji were mostly inhabited by Kurds.

In 1930 it was abolished and most remaining Kurds were deported to Central Asia. Official Azerbaijani records claim 6,000+ Kurds, while Kurdish leaders estimate as much as 150,000 (including those living in Central Asia and Russia). The problem is that the historical record of the Kurds in Azerbaijan is filled with lacunae. For instance, in 1979 there was according to the census no Kurds recorded.

Not only did Turkey and Azerbaijan pursue an identical policy against the Kurds, they even employed identical techniques like forced assimilation, manipulation of population figures, settlement of non-Kurds in areas predominantly Kurdish, suppression of publications and abolition of Kurdish as a medium of instruction in schools. Kurdish historical figures such as Sharaf Khan of Bitlis and Ahmad Khani and the Shaddadid dynasty as a whole were described as Azeris. Kurds who retained 'Kurdish' as their nationality on their internal passports as opposed to 'Azeri' were unable to find employment.

In the past, in what is currently West of Azerbaijan (which includes Lachin), Kurds lived with an uneasy rivalry with the Azeri Turks. In modern time they harbor some animosity toward them who they associate with the Turks, which is not made easier because of Azerbaijan's prevailing policy of forceful assimilation.

== See also ==
- Kurds in Azerbaijan
