= Kurds in Turkmenistan =

Ethnic group in Turkmenistan

Turkmen Kurds
Total population
- 6,097 (0.1%) (1995 census); 50,000 (estimate)

Regions with significant populations
- Ashgabat, Baýramaly, Firjuza, Kara Kala, Mary & near the Atrek River and the Kopet Dag.

Languages
- Kurdish (Kurmanji), Turkmen, Russian

Religion
- Islam

Related ethnic groups
- other Iranian peoples, Kurdish diaspora

The Kurds in Turkmenistan form a part of the historically significant Kurdish population in the post-Soviet space, and encompass people born in or residing in Turkmenistan who are of Kurdish origin. In the 17th century, Abbas I of Persia and Nader Shah settled Kurdish tribes from Khuzestan alongside the Iranian-Turkmen border. More Kurds arrived to Turkmenistan in the 19th century to find unclaimed land and to escape starvation.

After the dissolution of Kurdistan Uyezd, many Kurds were deported to Turkmenistan. Stalin deported many Kurds from Caucasus to Turkmenistan in 1937 and again in 1944. Since the 1980s, The Kurds of Turkmenistan have been subject to government sponsored assimilation programmes. Under Soviet Turkmenistan the Kurds had their own newspapers and schools, but since the independence of Turkmenistan, the Turkmen President Saparmurat Niyazov had closed almost all non-Turkmen schools. The majority of the Turkmen Kurds are followers of Shia Islam, with a small minority of Sunni Islam followers.

Despite that the History of current Kurds in Turkmenistan started in 17th Century. The relations and first Contacts between Kurds and Turkmens started with the arrival of the Seljuks in the Middle East.

== Population ==
Year	Population	Note
1926	2,308	In the Turkmen SSR
1936	1,954	In the Turkmen SSR
1959	2,263	In the Turkmen SSR
1970	2,933	In the Turkmen SSR
1979	3,521	In the Turkmen SSR
1989	4,387	In the Turkmen SSR
1995	6,097 (0.1%)	In Turkmenistan

== See also ==
- Kurdish diaspora
- Ethnic groups in Turkmenistan
- Kurds of Khorasan
