= Kurdish Republic of Lachin =

Unrecognized state in the Caucasus

Kurdish Republic of Lachin Komara kurdî ya Laçînê Кoмара Кӧрдийа Лачине
- 1992
- Flag

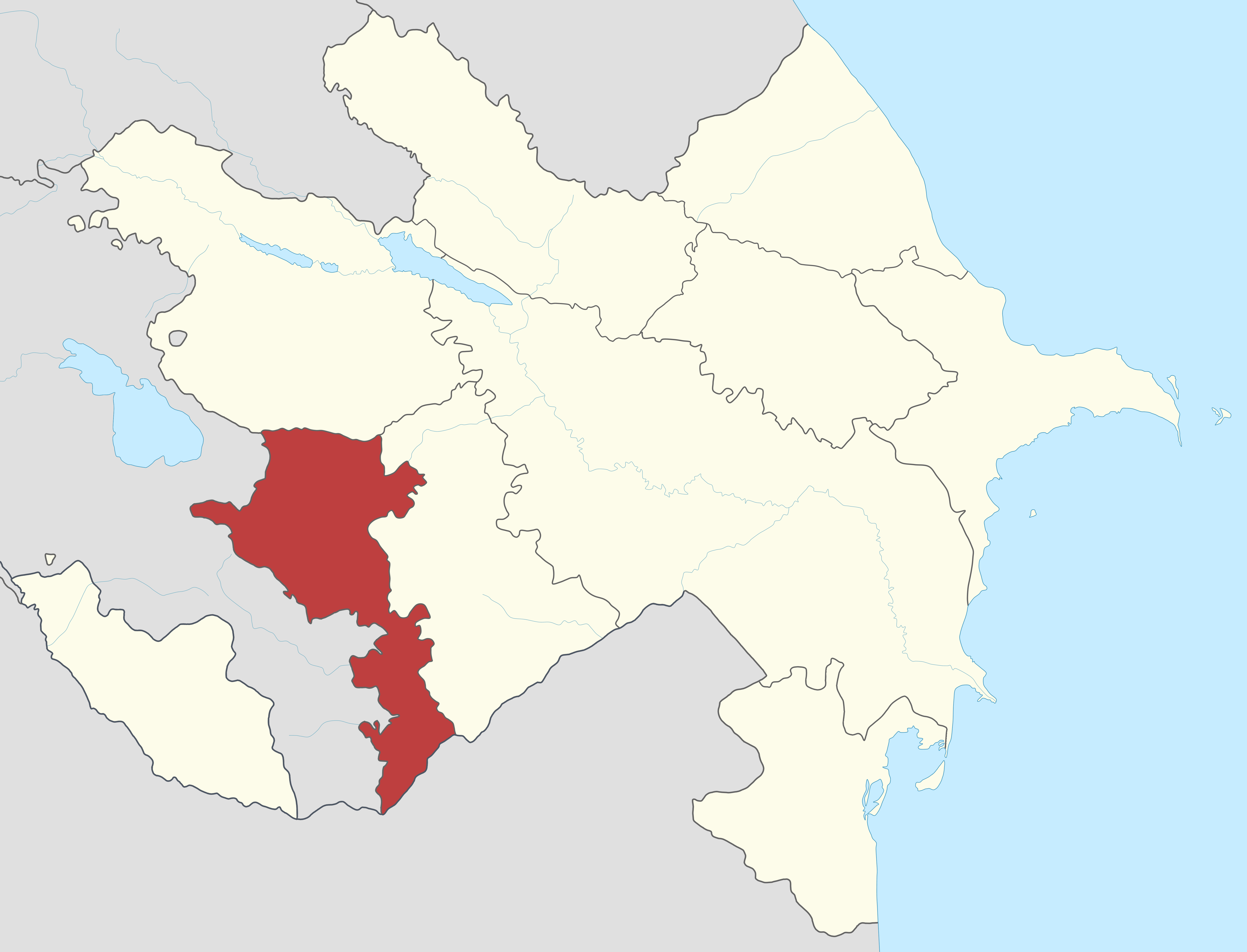
- Kurdish Republic of Lachin in 1992
- Capital: Lachin
- Government: Republic
  - President and Prime Minister: Wekîl Mistefayêv
  - Deputy Prime Minister: Sheref e Eshir
- History
  - Established: 20 May 1992
  - Disestablished: 30 November 1992
Preceded by	Succeeded by
Azerbaijan	Nagorno-Karabakh Republic
- Today part of: Azerbaijan

The Kurdish Republic of Lachin (Kurdish: Komara kurdî ya Laçînê; Кoмара Кӧрдийа Лачине) was a short-lived unrecognized state declared by Kurdish nationalists on the territory of the former Kurdistan Uezd in 1992, during the First Nagorno-Karabakh War, and dissolved in the same year.

== Background ==
In 1923, the government of the Soviet Union had created an administrative unit known as Kurdistan Uezd, or "Red Kurdistan" within the Azerbaijan SSR. It consisted of the districts of Lachin, Qubadli and Zangilan, with its capital in Lachin. According to the 1926 census, 73% of its population was Kurdish and 26% was Azerbaijani. The Kurdistan Uezd was briefly reorganized into the Kurdistan Okrug in 1930 and then dissolved; after this, a series of deportations of the Kurds followed.

Starting from 1961, when the First Iraqi–Kurdish War started, there were efforts by the deportees for the restoration of their rights, spearheaded by Mehmet Babayev; these proved to be futile. Later, during the perestroika era in the 1980s, there was a resurgence in the nationalist aspirations of Soviet Kurds, leading to the formation of the Yekbûn organization in 1989, which aimed to reestablish Kurdish autonomy. The government of the USSR under Gorbachev attempted to cooperate with the Yekbûn to negotiate the reestablishment of Red Kurdistan. Nonetheless, the 1991 collapse of the USSR coupled with Turkey's hostility to this plan ended all aspirations for an autonomous Kurdish state within the Soviet Union.

== History ==
The First Nagorno-Karabakh War (1988–1994), fought by the Armenian separatists of the nascent Nagorno-Karabakh Republic together with Armenia against Azerbaijan, spilled over into the areas of the former Red Kurdistan. The fighting caused more than 80% of the existing Kurdish population to flee the region.

However, members of a new organization, the "Caucasian Kurdistan Freedom Movement", led by Wekîl Mistefayêv, stayed behind. Mistefayêv, who had been exiled to the Uzbek SSR as a young man during the Soviet deportations, had returned to help organize the nationalists. After Armenian forces captured Lachin in May 1992, the Armenian government contacted the nationalists and encouraged them to proclaim a Kurdish state in Lachin, promising military assistance and telling them to gather together the Kurdish population from across the former USSR. Babayev was strongly in opposition to this plan, arguing that the Armenians were not to be trusted and only wanted to use the Kurds against the Azerbaijanis.

=== Independence ===
The Caucasian Kurdistan Freedom Movement convened in Lachin and declared the establishment of the Kurdish Republic of Lachin on 20 May 1992, raising the Kurdish flag in the city. The declaration of independence was framed as a restoration of the Kurdistan Uezd. The atmosphere in this ceremony was compared to that of a wedding celebration. Around 70 Kurdish intellectuals and young people were present, together with a few Armenian observers; around 20 of the young people were armed. They arrived in Lachin via buses provided by the Yerevan municipal government. During the proclamation ceremony, Mistefayêv was declared prime minister, and announced some members of his cabinet: Sheref e Eshir as the deputy prime minister; Karlan e Chachani as the Minister of Culture, and Emerike Serdar as the Minister of Information. Furthermore, it was proclaimed that the Caucasian Kurdistan Freedom Movement would exercise full authority until elected bodies were formed; and that nationwide elections would be scheduled for 19 July 1992; and that the new state would seek peaceful relations with Armenia, the nascent Nagorno-Karabakh Republic, Azerbaijan, and Iran. The districts of Lachin, Jabrayil, Kalbajar, Qubadli, and Zangilan all came under the administration of the republic.

By the end of the month, however, Mistefayêv had foreseen the downfall of the republic, and told Özgür Gündem that Armenia had not sent them any aid or weapons, and that the plan to bring in Kurds from other parts of the former USSR had collapsed. Nonetheless, the first congress of the republic was held on 9 June, resulting in the election of Mistefayêv as president.

Armenia's stance regarding the nationalists' actions was initially supportive. The proclamation of the republic, in the eyes of the Armenian authorities, could be used as leverage against Azerbaijan by showing that the Kurds and Armenians were standing together to fight against Azerbaijan. Furthermore, it was presumed that the Kurdish Republic of Lachin would be effectively under the suzerainty of Armenia and its existence would not affect the corridor connecting Armenia with Nagorno-Karabakh proper. The government of Russia also lent its support to the nascent republic; in June 1992 Mistefayêv traveled to Moscow to meet with the Russian Ministry of Foreign Affairs. In a 2014 interview with Rudaw, Mistefayêv alleged that following the meeting with the Russians, Azerbaijan had attempted to bribe him to dissolve the republic, but he refused.

Much to the chagrin of Azerbaijan, Armenia continued to back the Kurdish Republic of Lachin throughout 1992. The Azerbaijani media routinely condemned what was seen as a joint Kurdish-Armenian effort to destabilize Azerbaijan. The deputy president of the organization "Kurdish Liberation Movement", Alikhane Mame, said that the fate of the Kurds depended on an Armenian victory in the war, and his claims were repeated in the Armenian media, infuriating Azerbaijan.

Mistefayêv also attended a conference of the PKK concerning the Kurdish struggle in Turkey in summer 1992; after this, he named Ishhan Aslan, a Kurd from Armenia, as the "military commander of this new republic".

Mistefayêv also said he had contact with Abdullah Öcalan during this time. Mistefayêv criticized Öcalan for his efforts to establish an independent Kurdistan in Syria since Hafez al-Assad's government would never let that come to fruition. Rather, he invited Öcalan to come to the Kurdish Republic of Lachin and be its president, saying that the republic was a free and secure land for Kurds under Armenian protection.

=== Dissolution ===
By the end of 1992, however, the Armenian authorities had begun to turn against Mistefayêv and his fellow nationalists, realizing that allowing the existence of a Kurdish republic in the region conflicted with the narrative that all Karabakh had always been ethnically Armenian, therefore undermining the entire argument for the war.

Aside from the growing hostility from Armenia, the other main problem for the Kurdish Republic of Lachin was that the vast majority of the Kurdish population of the region had by then fled due to the war. It was becoming increasingly clear that prolonging the republic's existence was no longer feasible, and it dissolved on 30 November 1992. The Nagorno-Karabakh Republic subsequently assumed full control over Lachin and the general area claimed by the Kurds. The remaining Kurds of the region left for Azerbaijan.

== Legacy ==
In 1997, Emerike Serdar said:

We all knew full well that the Armenians were never going to give us that land, and that we were never going to be able to convince the Kurds to come and settle in the land depopulated because of the war. But we went to Lachin to leave a marker for history. We filmed it all, we took photographs. This struggle will not end. One day when this issue becomes topical again we will have documentation in our hands.

In 2007, the government of Azerbaijan alleged that the PKK's leadership was moving its bases from Iraqi Kurdistan to the Nagorno-Karabakh Republic, and that a Kurdish autonomous administration would be recreated in the Lachin and Kelbajar regions. This never materialized and Azerbaijan's claims appear to have amounted to mere allegations.

Wekîl Mistefayêv fled to Italy after the republic's dissolution; he died in on 19 April 2019 in Brussels and was buried in Erbil of the autonomous Kurdistan region in Iraq. His nephew Bahaddin Mustafayev told the media that his uncle "dedicated all his life for the freedom of the Kurdish people" and had supported the 2017 Kurdistan region independence referendum.

== See also ==
- Kurds in Azerbaijan
- List of Kurdish dynasties and countries
