= Sheylanli =

Sheylanli Şeylanlı
- Location within Azerbaijan Location within East Zangezur Economic Region
- Coordinates: 39°46′16″N 46°17′21″E
- Country: Azerbaijan
- District: Lachin
- Elevation: 1,646 m (5,400 ft)

Population (2015)
  - Total: 24
- Time zone: UTC+4 (AZT)

Sheylanli (Kurdish: Şeylanlî; Azerbaijani: Şeylanlı) is a village in the Lachin District of Azerbaijan. Historically, the village had a Kurdish population; the town itself is named after the Kurdish Sheylanli tribe. Sheylanli is surrounded by several historical, cultural and architectural monuments, including an arch bridge on the Hakari River.

== Geography ==
The village is located in the Lesser Caucasus mountains, in the northern part of the Lachin district on the western side of the Hakari River (almost in the river source), 330 km from Baku, the capital of Azerbaijan.

== History ==
The name of the village is related to the name of the Kuridsh Sheylanli tribe, which lived in the area until the First Nagorno-Karabakh War and was referred to as Sheylanli during the Soviet period. According to Shamil Asgarov and other sources, the Sheylanli tribe is considered to be one of the 24 Kurdish tribes that were moved from Iran to Karabakh and Zangezur by Shah Abbas I of Iran in the 16th century, to fortify the borders of the Safavid Empire. After the war, inhabitants of the village relocated to Takhta Korpu, in Aghjabadi district, which were previously used as winter-grounds by the villagers during the Soviet period.

The village was located in the Armenian-occupied territories surrounding Nagorno-Karabakh, coming under the control of ethnic Armenian forces on May 17, 1992 during the First Nagorno-Karabakh War. The village subsequently became part of the breakaway Republic of Artsakh as part of its Kashatagh Province, referred to as Shrvakan (Armenian: Շրվական). It was returned to Azerbaijan as part of the 2020 Nagorno-Karabakh ceasefire agreement.
