= Azerbaijanis in Kazakhstan =

Part of the Azerbaijani diaspora

Azerbaijanis in Kazakhstan Qazaxıstan azərbaycanlıları Qazaqstandağy äzırbaijandar
Total population
- 155,364 (2025 est.)

Regions with significant populations
- Astana • Almaty • Merki

Languages
- Azerbaijani • Kazakh • Russian

Religion
- Predominately Shia Islam, with Christian minority

Related ethnic groups
- Azerbaijani diaspora

Azerbaijanis in Kazakhstan are part of the greater Azerbaijani diaspora. They are Kazakh citizens and permanent residents of ethnic Azerbaijani background. According to the 2021 census, there were 145,615 ethnic Azerbaijanis living in Kazakhstan; Azerbaijanis comprised 0.76% of Kazakhstan's population and were the country's seventh largest ethnic minority.

Most Azerbaijani-Kazakhs have immigrated to Kazakhstan from the Republic of Azerbaijan; a small group of Iranian Azerbaijanis trapped by the Bolshevik taking of power in 1918 were also forced into Kazakhstan in 1938.

== Population ==
In 2021 national census 67% of Azerbaijani Kazakhstanis identified as Muslims, 0.7% as Christians, and 4.9% as irreligious.

Azerbaijanis in Kazakhstan according to official censuses
Census	Azerbaijanis	% of national population
1939	12,996	0.21%
1959	38,362	0.41%
1970	56,166	0.44%
1979	73,345	0.50%
1989	90,083	0.55%
1999	78,325	0.52%
2009	85,292	0.53%
2021	145,615	0.76%

== See also ==
- Azerbaijan–Kazakhstan relations
- Azerbaijani diaspora
- Ethnic groups in Kazakhstan
