= Deportations of Kurds from Transcaucasia =

Soviet forced displacement (1937–44)

Deportation of Kurds in the Soviet Union
- Part of Population transfer in the Soviet Union, and mass operations of the NKVD
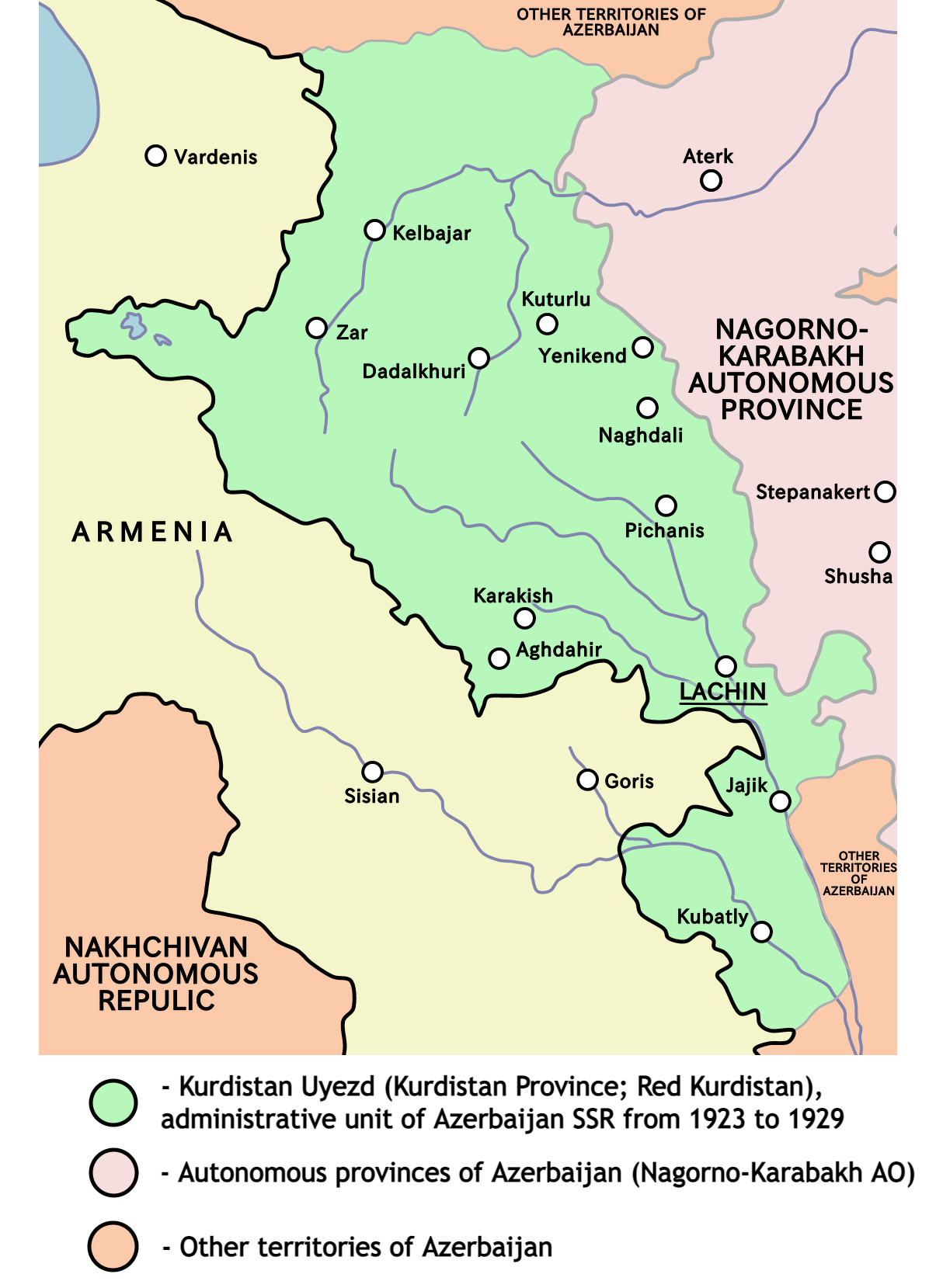
- Kurdistan Uezd within Azerbaijan SSR in 1920s
- Location: Caucasus
- Date: July 1937, March 1944, November 1944
- Target: Caucasian Kurds
- Attack type: Forcible displacement, ethnic cleansing
- Perpetrator: NKVD
- Motive: "Frontier cleansing"

The Kurds were deported from Azerbaijan SSR, Georgian SSR, and Armenian SSR by the Soviet secret police NKVD in 1937 and 1944 and sent to special settlements in Central Asia. During the July 1937 deportation, approximately 1,325 Kurds were deported. In March, 3,240 Kurds and Azerbaijanis were deported from Tbilisi. In November 1944 the Kurds of Georgian SSR were also sent to the "special colonies", including those in Siberia, and were resettled there, as part of the deportation of the Meskhetian Turks, when 8,694 Kurds were deported. Most adult males were deported separately from females and children with their fate unknown.

== History ==
Ismet Cheriff Vanly emphasizes that "the deportations of 1937 were quite unrelated to the Second World War or its anticipation. Nor can the deportation of 1944 be connected with the war. In this respect they differ from the cases of the Crimean Tatars and the Volga Germans". He refers to Professor Shakero Mihoyi, according to whom the deportations transpired at the instigation of Mir Jafar Baghirov, the Azerbaijani government's leader, who maintained close connections with Stalin and the OGPU. Vanly continues that "[w]hile this may be true in the case of the Kurds deported from Azerbaijan, it fails to explain why Armenia and Georgia followed suit". He writes that it appears that the deportations were instigated by pressure from Turkey, as Turkey was concurrently engaged in the deportation of its Kurdish populace.

Not all Transcaucasian Kurds were subjected to deportation for resettlement in Kazakhstan, Kirghizia, Tajikistan, Uzbekistan, and Siberia. Some among them were able to eventually return to Transcaucasia. However, the precise figures regarding the deported population remain unknown.

According to Vanly's calculations, "in 1990 […] the four districts of Kurdistan might have a total population of 300±350,000 of whom some two-thirds would be Kurdish, and in Transcaucasia as a whole Kurds would have numbered close to one million, including 500,000 in Azerbaijan, had it not been for deportations and other forms of persecution".

The census data from 1970, which recorded 88,930 Kurds in the Soviet Union, reflects, together with the manipulation of the figures, the fact of mass deportation of Kurds. Vanly criticizes the explanation of Soviet philologist Magomet Isayev that the reason for the sharp decline in the number of Kurds in the census was their "assimilation", because they were "scattered among several other nationalities", as a "typical Soviet euphemism for the forcible deportations of 1937 and 1944 and the resettlement in Soviet republics largely in Central Asia".

Among the deported Kurds were Nadir Nadirov (from the Azerbaijan SSR) and Arab Shamilov (from the Armenian SSR).

Vanly places responsibility for the enforced deportations of the Kurds on Stalin, Baghirov and their adherents.

== Legacy ==
Under Mikhail Gorbachev, Kurds from different republics of the USSR held rallies. On May 20, 1989, a sizable and well-organized demonstration conducted by Kurds occurred in Moscow's Pushkin Square. Representing groups from nine Soviet republics, the demonstrators subsequently marched to Ismailovsky Park the following day, as documented by Soviet media outlets, including television. Particularly notable among the demonstrators were women from the Central Asian republics, where the majority of adult Kurds are female due to the forced deportations and disappearances of their male relatives over the preceding fifty years. Their spokeswoman, Mezihe Ghefûr, made the statement about legacy of Kurdish deportations and the problems of the Kurds in the USSR.

On August 17, 1989, the Supreme Soviet enacted a law stipulating the repatriation of all Soviet citizens who had been subjected to deportation during Stalin's regime, with the restoration of their previous rights. Nevertheless, its implementation faced significant challenges. While certain groups, like the Volga Germans, were able to return to a welcoming homeland, for others such as the Crimean Tatars and the Kurds, their original territories had been colonized by Russians, and in the case of Kurds, by Azerbaijanis, posing serious barriers to their return.

== See also ==
- Population transfer in the Soviet Union

== Sources ==
- Human Rights Watch (1991). "Punished Peoples" of the Soviet Union: The Continuing Legacy of Stalin's Deportations" (PDF). New York City. LCCN 91076226.
- Marshall, Alex (2012). The Caucasus under Soviet rule. London: Routledge. ISBN 9781136938245. OCLC 782991038.
- Polian, Pavel (2003). "Soviet Repression of Foreigners: The Great Terror, the Gulag, Deportations". In Dundovich, Elena; Gori, Francesca; Guercetti, Emanuela (eds.). Reflections on the Gulag: With a Documentary Index on the Italian Victims of Repression in the USSR. Milano: Feltrinelli Editore. ISBN 9788807990588. OCLC 803610496.
- Polian, Pavel (2004). Against Their Will: The History and Geography of Forced Migrations in the USSR. Budapest; New York City: Central European University Press. ISBN 9789639241688. LCCN 2003019544.
- Vanly, Ismet Cheriff (1992). Kreyenbroek, Philip G.; Sperl, Stefan (eds.). The Kurds: A Contemporary Overview. Routledge. ISBN 0-203-99341-1.
