= Azerbaijan–Kazakhstan relations =

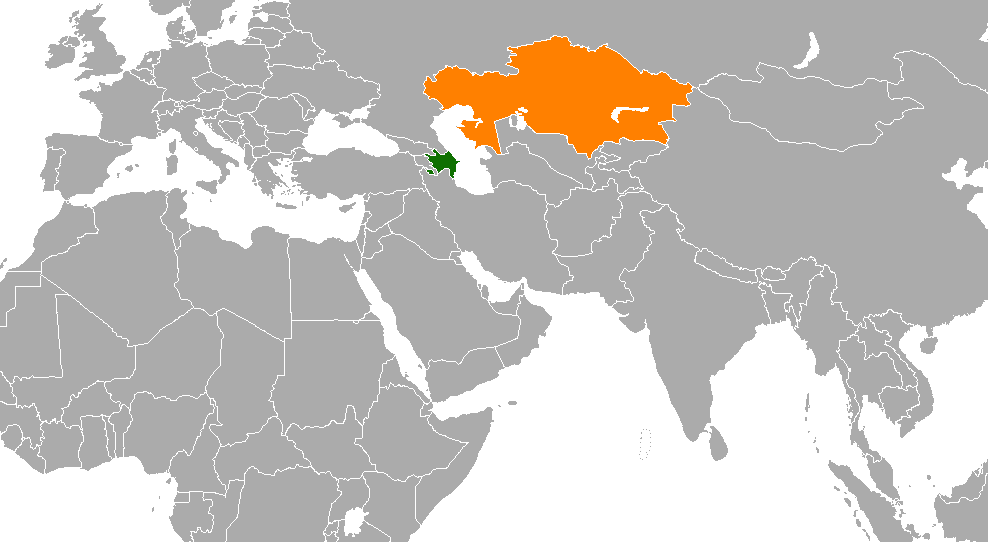

- Azerbaijan: Kazakhstan

Foreign relations exist between Azerbaijan and Kazakhstan. Azerbaijan has an embassy in Astana and a consulate in Aktau. Kazakhstan has an embassy in Baku.

Many Azerbaijanis and Kazakhs, as well as the heads of both states usually refer to it as the Azerbaijani-Kazakh brotherhood and consider each other an ally and kindred nation.

Both countries were part of the Achaemenid Empire, Sassanid Empire, Umayyad Caliphate, Abbasid Caliphate, Great Seljuk Empire, Russian Empire and Soviet Union. Following the dissolution of the Soviet Union both countries declared their independence. Diplomatic relations were established on August 27, 1992. Both countries are full members of the Commonwealth of Independent States (CIS), the Economic Cooperation Organization (ECO), Organization of Turkic States, Joint Administration of Turkic Arts and Culture, Organisation of Islamic Cooperation and the Organization for Security and Co-operation in Europe (OSCE).

== Cultural relations ==
Azerbaijanis and Kazakhs are both Turkic-speaking people and share close historical, religious and cultural ties. Both are littoral states of the Caspian Sea and possess a common maritime border. During the Great Purge in the Soviet Union, more than 150,000 Azerbaijanis immigrated or were deported to Kazakhstan and the current Azeri population reaches 85,000. Kazakhstan and Azerbaijan see each other as main allies and partners in Central Asia and Transcaucasia. Both countries are members of Turkic Council and Joint Administration of Turkic Arts and Culture. Famous Azerbaijani singer-songwriter and diplomat/politician Polad Bülbüloğlu was awarded with National Award of Peace and Progress for his special contribution to peace, friendship and resolution of cultural problems in the Turkic-speaking world. Ilham Aliyev was awarded with being an Honorary Professor of L.N.Gumilev Eurasian National University while his father Heydar Aliyev was named an honorary doctor of the Kazakh National University (which was named after Al-Farabi). Nursultan Nazarbayev was a presenter at the celebration honouring the "One thousand three hundredth anniversary of the epic Azerbaijani legend Book of Dede Korkut".

On 25 September 2006, the Azerbaijani Culture Center named after Imadaddin Nasimi was opened in Jambyl province of Kazakhstan. Since 2007, the Azerbaijani diaspora publishes a newspaper named "Vətən" in Kazakhstan. Besides that, Sumgayit and Aktau are twin towns. There is a monument in Kazakhstan dedicated to victims of Stalin's repressions in Azerbaijan. In 2011, Baku State University opened a center named after Kazakh poet Abai Qunanbaiuli.

== Political relations ==
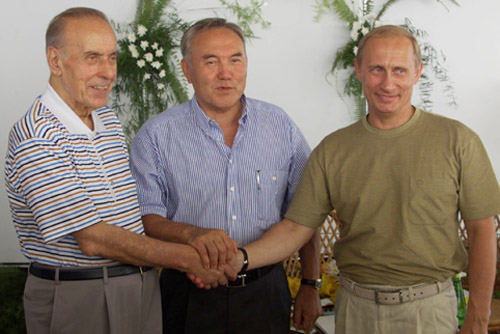
Heydar Aliyev, Nursultan Nazarbayev and Vladimir Putin, 2001, in Sochi

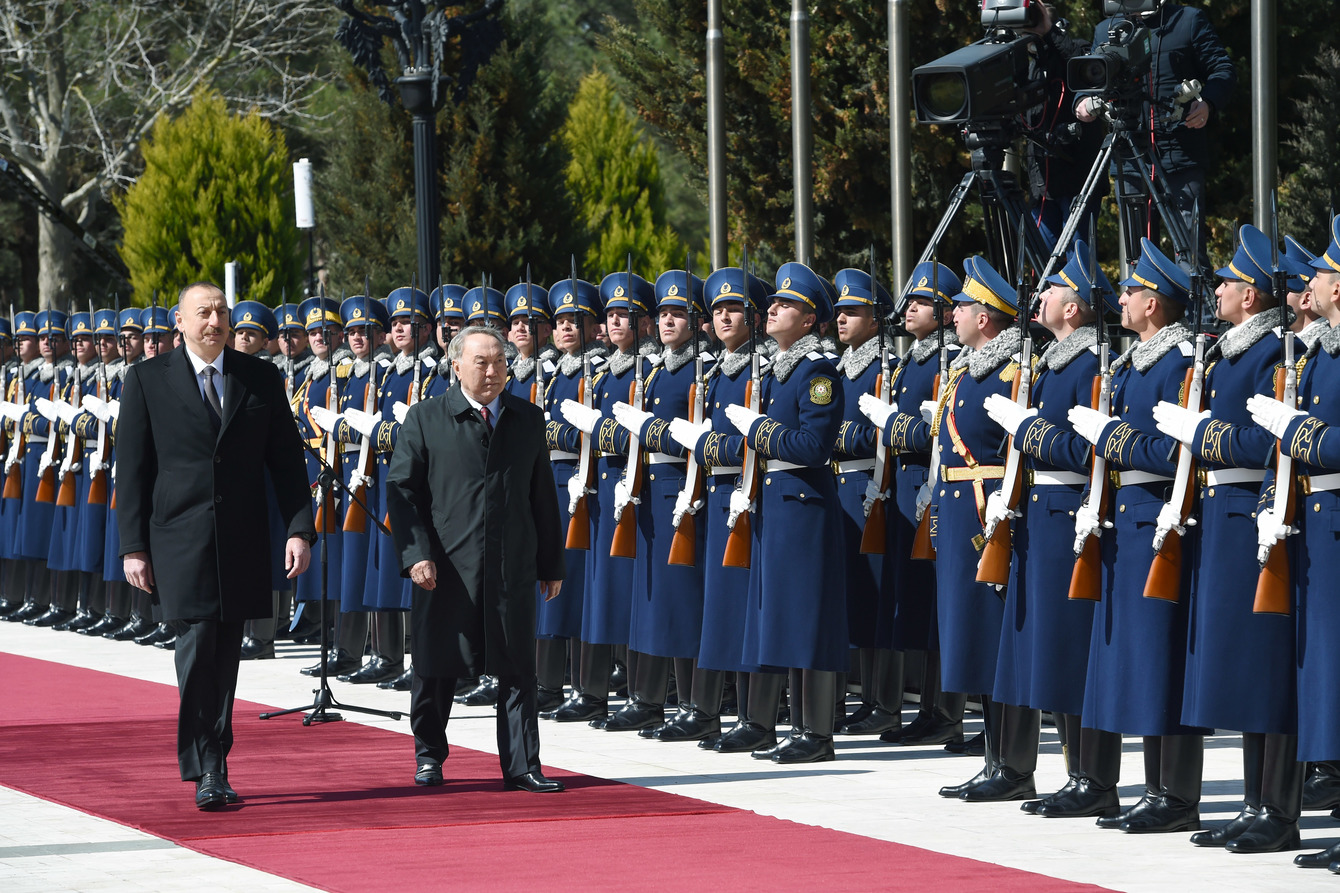
Ilham Aliyev and Nursultan Nazarbayev inspecting the guard of honour, 2017, in Baku

Ex-President of Azerbaijan Heydar Aliyev and President of Kazakhstan Nursultan Nazarbayev reportedly were close friends for a long time. Nazarbayev have stated that:

We knew each other for decades. When Heydar Aliyev was working in Kremlin, I was visiting him regularly for to get support. I was one of the first persons who visited him when he was in hospital in Moscow. When he had a great loss - in the funeral of his wife, I was there too. I think Azerbaijani people did the right choice with choosing him for a president. He was my friend and a politician that I was respecting a lot. He had carried out number of works aimed to the strengthening of the many-centurial friendship between Kazakh and Azeri nations, development of the Republic of Azerbaijan, CIS.

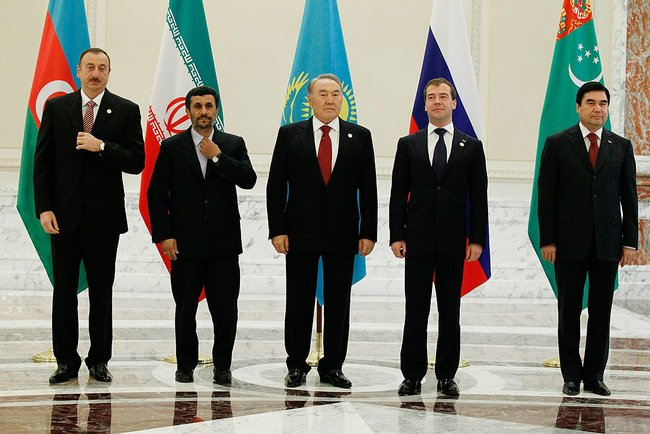
Kazakhstan and Azerbaijan both reached an agreement on the legal status of Caspian Sea in a short time. Caspian Sea is also surrounded by Russia, Iran and Turkmenistan.

The heads of both states visit each other regularly. Heydar Aliyev paid a visit to Kazakhstan in order to take part in the 150th anniversary of Abay Kunanbayev. Heydar Aliyev was awarded with the medal "Astana" for his services in the development of friendly relations with Kazakhstan.

During the Aliyev presidency, Azeri-Kazakh relations mostly covered the legal status of the Caspian Sea and the fields of agriculture and energy. A new impulse toward developing Azerbaijani–Kazakhstani relations was given by a state visit of current Azerbaijani president Ilham Aliyev to Astana in March 2004, and a state visit of President Nursultan Nazarbayev to Azerbaijan in May 2005. A number of bilateral instruments, including the "Strategic Partnership and Allies' Relations Treaty", were signed. Both presidents regularly conduct an official visit to each country for discussing economical development, strategic alliance and co-operation in other areas, particularly on the transportation of Caspian oil and gas to world markets. Both presidents have emphasized the importance of the role Kazakhstan has in large-scale projects, especially in Baku-Tbilisi-Ceyhan.

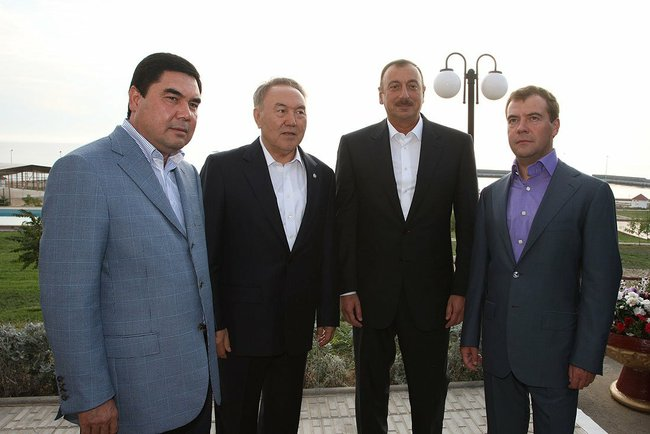
Azerbaijan and Kazakhstan have a successful cooperation within the frames of international organizations. Kazakhstan agreed to join the Baku-Tbilisi-Ceyhan project and transport its oil and gas resources to the world market through Azerbaijan.

Prime Minister of Azerbaijan Artur Rasizade participated in the inaugural ceremony of Kazakh President on January 11–12, 2006 in Astana.

One of the priority directions in bilateral cooperation is co-ordination of the legal status of the Caspian Sea. On November 29, 2001, the presidents of both countries signed the "Agreement on Delimitation of the Bottom of the Caspian Sea" during a CIS summit in Moscow.

On October 21, 2025, a ceremony was held in Astana with the participation of Azerbaijani President Ilham Aliyev and Kazakhstani President Kassym-Jomart Tokayev for the signing and exchange of documents between the two countries. During the ceremony, a joint statement marking the 20th anniversary of the strategic partnership and alliance between Azerbaijan and Kazakhstan was issued, and documents related to the decisions of the Supreme Interstate Council were signed. Various cooperation agreements and memorandums of understanding were exchanged between the governments and relevant institutions of the two countries. These documents cover cooperation in areas such as industrial property, energy, internal affairs, statistics, the prosecutor’s office, health, transport, digital services, artificial intelligence, competition, and market regulation.

=== The Nagorno Karabakh War ===
Kazakhstan played a role during Nagorno-Karabakh War and undertook the first peace attempt. Nursultan Nazarbayev and then Russian president Boris Yeltsin attempted to end the three-year-long hostilities between Armenia and Azerbaijan over Nagorno-Karabakh region. Although consensus was reached, Armenia ceased to stop its attacks. The peace efforts came to a halt during the crash of an Azerbaijani MI-8 helicopter with Russian, Kazakh observers and Azerbaijani high-ranking state officials on board when it was shot down by Armenians over Karakend village of Khojavend district. Despite many Kazakh politicians supporting Azerbaijan's positions, officially Astana seeks a peaceful resolution, it also supports Lithuania's efforts as the OSCE chairman to resolve protracted conflicts, in particular those of Nagorno-Karabakh and Transnistria. Famous Kazakh poet and politician Olzhas Suleimenov have described Armenia as an "occupier" and added that Armenian forces should leave Azerbaijani territory.

== Trade and economical cooperation ==
According to Statistics Agency of Kazakhstan, exports to Azerbaijan in 2005 were US $ 129 million and imports from Azerbaijan totalled US $ 3 million. Transit transport corridors are key to Azerbaijan–Kazakhstan relations.

In 2014, the Coordinating Committee of TMTM was established. JSC “NC“ Kazakhstan Temir Zholy ”, Turkish State Railways, CJSC Azerbaijan Railways, JSC Georgian Railways are parts of this committee. Today, the committee includes Kazakhstan, China, Azerbaijan, Georgia, Turkey, Ukraine, Poland, and Romania.

In November 2016, Caspian Shipping Company and Kazakhstan railways signed an agreement on strategic cooperation, also logistic companies such as Express shipping and ACSC Logistics signed the agreement of joint venture.

In December 2016, there was a meeting between heads of railway ministries of Georgia, Kazakhstan, and Azerbaijan. An association for promoting the Trans-Caspian International Transport Route (TITR) was established.

=== Commodity turnover ===
Trade turnover between Azerbaijan and Kazakhstan at the end of 2016 was 136.6 million US dollars.

It was increased by 7.9% in comparison to 2015. Import to the Azerbaijan from Kazakhstan: 105.9 million dollars Import to Kazakhstan from Azerbaijan: 33.8 million dollars.

Main trade resources are oil, chemical materials, mechanism parts, building materials.

=== Regional cooperation ===
During 2016, the number of treaties was signed. Over 10 forums in 3 years have been held in Kazakhstan and Azerbaijan where both countries representatives were participating.

In October 2015, Azerbaijan-Kazakhstan business forum was held. The event was organized by “Kaznex Invest” together with Commerce Chamber of Azerbaijan.

== Ambassadors of Azerbaijan to Kazakhstan ==
- Gandilov, Latif Seyfaddin oglu - 01/29/2004 - 06/24/2010
- Gashimov, Zakir Arif oglu - 24.06.2010 - 25.11.2015
- Mammadov, Rashad Eynaddin oglu - 12/23/2015

== See also ==
- Foreign relations of Azerbaijan
- Foreign relations of Kazakhstan
- Azerbaijanis in Kazakhstan
- Armenia–Kazakhstan relations
- Kazakhstan–Turkey relations
