= Kurds in Georgia =

Ethnic group in Georgia

Georgian Kurds
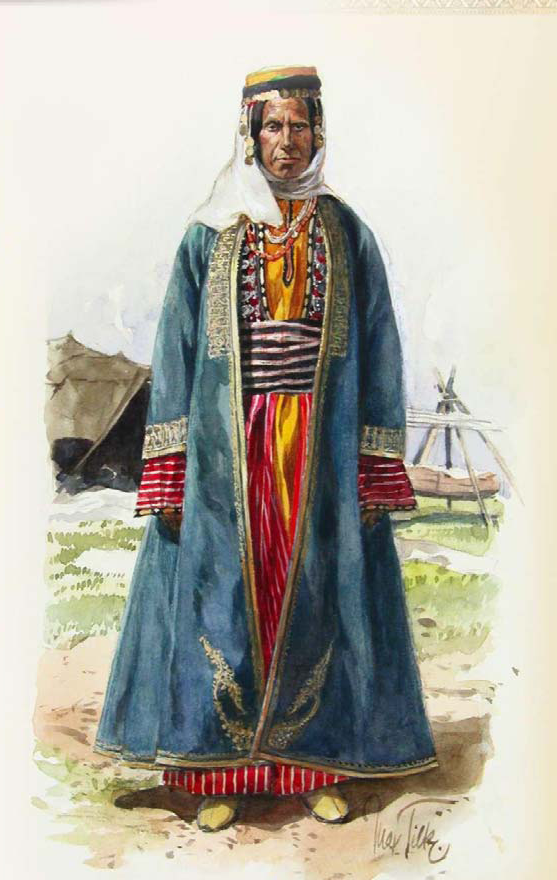

Total population
- 13,861 (2014 census). 0.48% 50.000 - 60.000

Regions with significant populations
- Batumi, Meskheti, Javakheti, Adjara, Rustavi, and Abkhazia.

Languages
- Kurdish (Kurmanji), Georgian, Russian

Religion
- Predominantly: Yazidism; Minority: Sunni Islam and Christianity

Related ethnic groups
- Other Iranic peoples, especially other Kurds and Yazidis

The Kurds in Georgia (Kurdish: Kurdên Gurcistanê, Кöрден Гӧрщьстане) form a major part of the historically significant Kurdish population in the post-Soviet space, and are members of the eponymous ethnic group that are citizens of Georgia. In the 20th century, most Kurds fled religious persecution in the Ottoman Empire to the Russian Empire. The return of their Kurdish surnames needs effort according to a Kurdish activist in Georgia. The Kurds also have their own schools, school books and a printing press in Georgia. Illiteracy among them disappeared in the early 1900s. Kurds in Georgia are politically neutral; however, in 1999 they staged a huge demonstration in Tbilisi, demanding the release of the founder of the Kurdistan Workers' Party, Abdullah Öcalan. Kurds in Georgia today use Cyrillic script. Earlier, in the 1920s, they used the Latin script.

== History ==
The first contacts between the Kurds and Georgia occurred sometime in the eighth and ninth centuries. Yezidi-Kurds came to Georgia during the reign of George III in the 12th century. Kurdish tribes appeared in Georgia in the 16th century in the city of Mtskheta. According to Georgian sources, during the 18th century, Kurds arrived in Tbilisi to get assistance from King Erekle II of the Kingdom of Kakheti during the Kurdish liberation in the Ottoman Empire. When Russia and Iran signed the Treaty of Turkmenchay in 1828, Kurds got the opportunity to work in Georgia. Most Kurds left Van and Kars for Georgia in 1918 after the Ottoman Empire oppressed them politically and religiously. The Kurds of Georgia also became victims of Stalin's purges in 1944. Between 1979 and 1989, the Kurdish population in Georgia increased 30%. Many Kurds have immigrated from Armenia. The largest Kurdish population in 1989 was found in the capital Tbilisi. When Georgia became independent, the Kurdish population in Georgia decreased.

== Religion ==
In 1989, most Kurds adhered to the Yazidi religion. Yazidis are recognized as ethnic Kurds in Georgia.

The Yazidi population in Georgia has been dwindling since the 1990s, mostly due to economic migration to neighboring Russia, Western Europe and North America. According to a census carried out in 1989, there were over 30,000 Yazidis in Georgia; according to the 2002 census, however, only around 18,000 Yazidis remained in Georgia. Today they number around 12,000 (by ethnicity, approx. 8,500 by religion) according to the most recent national census, including recent refugees from Sinjar in Iraq, who fled to Georgia following persecution by ISIL.

On 16 June 2015, Yazidis celebrated the opening of the Sultan Ezid Temple and cultural centre, named after Sultan Ezid in Varketili, a suburb of Tbilisi. This is the third such temple in the world after those in Kurdistan Region and Armenia.

== Genetics ==
David Comas and colleagues found that mitochondrial sequence pools in Georgians and Kurds are similar, despite their different linguistic and prehistoric backgrounds. Both populations present mtDNA lineages that clearly belong to the Western Eurasian gene pool.

The populations with smallest genetic distance from Georgian Kurds were found to be Kurds from Turkey and Iran. Interestingly, the Kurmanji speakers from Turkey were found to be closer to the Zazaki speakers from Turkey than to the Georgian Kurds. Despite the former speaking the same dialect as the Georgian Kurds. The Y-chromosome data suggests that the Kurdish group in Georgia was founded by Kurmanji speakers of Turkey.

== Demographics ==
Kurdish population in Georgia (1926-2014)
| Kurdish | 1926 | | 1939 | | 1959 | | 1970 | | 1979 | | 1989 | | 2002 | | 2014 | |
| Kurdish | Number | % | Number | % | Number | % | Number | % | Number | % | Number | % | Number | % | Number | % |
|---|---|---|---|---|---|---|---|---|---|---|---|---|---|---|---|---|
| Georgia | 5,428 | 0.4% | 12,915 | 0.4% | 16,212 | 0.4% | 20,690 | 0.4% | 25,688 | 0.5% | 33,331 | 0.6% | 20,843 | 0.5% | 13,770 | 0.4% |
| Tbilisi | | | 2,611 | 1% | 12,935 | 1.9% | 18,409 | 2.1% | 23,413 | 2.2% | 30,304 | 2.4% | 17,116 | 1.6% | 12,570 | 1.1% |
| Kakheti | | | | | | | | | 838 | 0.2% | 1,107 | 0.3% | 495 | 0.1% | 528 | 0.2% |
| Kvemo Kartli | | | | | | | | | 1,050 | 0.2% | 1,413 | 0.2% | 463 | 0.1% | 453 | 0.1% |
| Adjara | 1,745 | 2.6% | 4,212 | 2.1% | 123 | 0.1% | 138 | 0% | 140 | 0% | 197 | 0.1% | 76 | 0% | 81 | 0% |
| Mtskheta-Mtianeti | | | | | | | | | 67 | 0.1% | 78 | 0.1% | 96 | 0.1% | 74 | 0.1% |
| Guria | | | | | | | | | 65 | 0% | 99 | 0.1% | 23 | 0% | 17 | 0% |
| Imereti | | | | | | | | | 75 | 0% | 54 | 0% | 56 | 0% | 6 | 0% |
| Shida Kartli | | | | | | | | | 3 | 0% | 28 | 0% | 1 | 0% | 4 | 0% |
| Samegrelo-Zemo Svaneti | | | | | | | | | 17 | 0% | 8 | 0% | 2 | 0% | 1 | 0% |
| Samtskhe-Javakheti | | | | | | | | | 4 | 0% | 13 | 0% | 1 | 0% | 1 | 0% |
| Abkhazia | 11 | 0% | 5 | 0% | – | – | 23 | 0% | 16 | 0% | 29 | 0% | – | – | – | – |
| South Ossetia | – | – | – | – | – | – | 9 | 0% | – | – | 2 | 0% | – | – | 1 | 0% (2015 census) |

== See also ==
- Kurdish population
- Ethnic groups in Georgia
- A Modern History of the Kurds by David McDowall
- Kurds in Armenia
- Kurds in Azerbaijan
- Kurds in Russia
- Kurds in Turkey
