= Aghjakand, Kalbajar =

Ağcakənd Azerbaijani: Ağcakənd / Kurdish: Gundê Spî
- Village
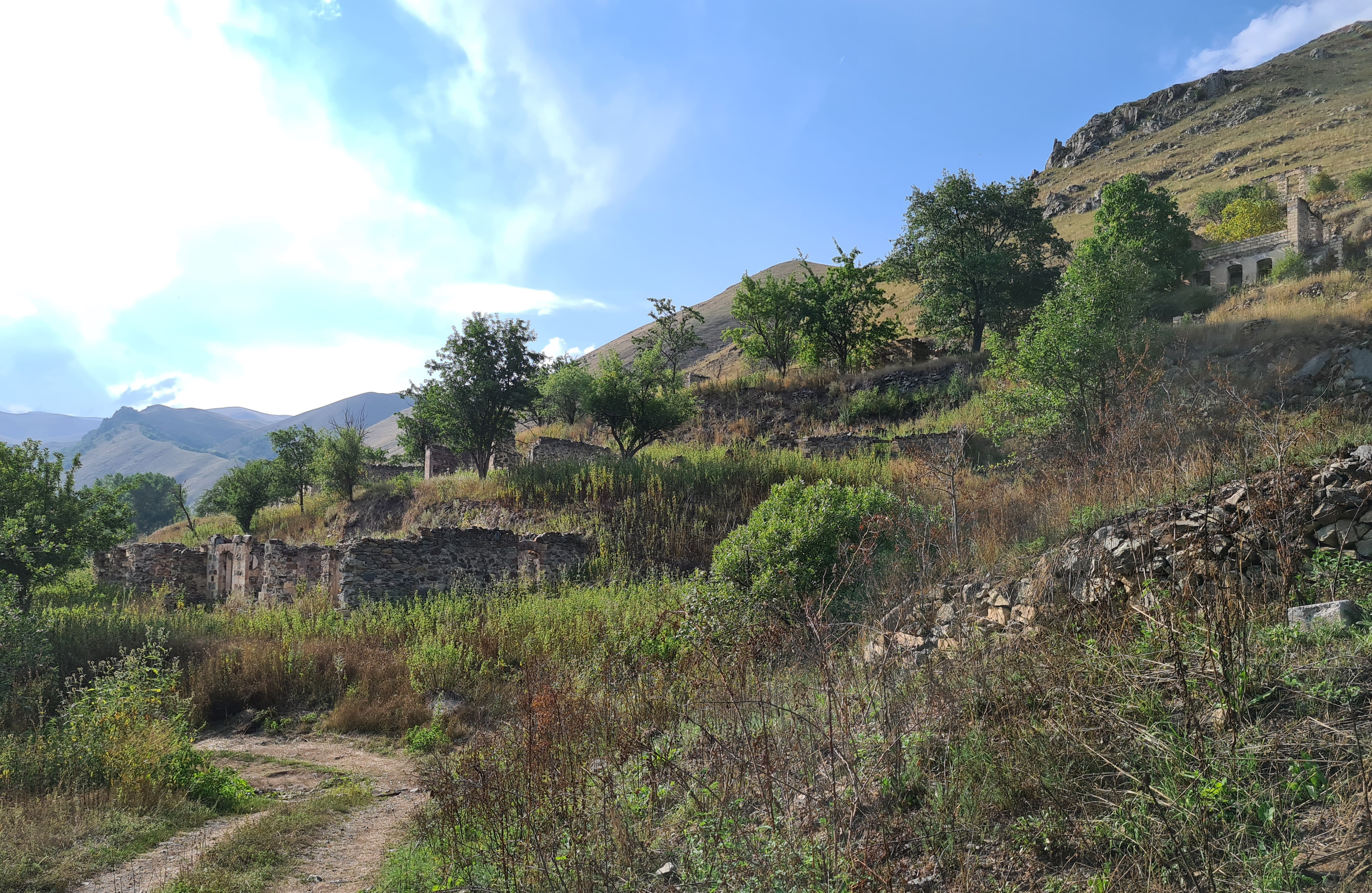

- Location within Azerbaijan
- Country: Azerbaijan
- District: Kalbajar
- Time zone: UTC+4 (AZT)

Ağcakənd (Kurdish: Gundê Spî) is a village in the Kalbajar District of Azerbaijan.

== Etymology ==
The name Ağcakənd comes from Azerbaijani words ağca (“white”) and kənd (“village”), meaning “white village.” The Kurdish name Gundê Spî has the same meaning, derived from gund (“village”) and spî (“white”).

== History ==
Historically, the village was inhabited primarily by Kurdish families engaged in agriculture and herding. During the Soviet period, it formed part of the administrative structure of the Azerbaijan SSR. Like many rural settlements in the region, Ağcakənd experienced depopulation during the regional conflicts of the 1990s, but some resettlement followed after stability was restored in the 2000s. In the 1930s, a traditional Kurdish puppet theatre "Kilim Arasi" functioned in Aghjakand.

== See also ==
- Kurds in Azerbaijan
- Kurdistan Uezd
