= Kurdistan Uezd =

Former region of Azerbaijan

Kurdistan uezd Red Kurdistan Кӧрдӧйәзд, Kurduyezd Кӧрдьстана Сор, Kurdistana Sor
- 1923–1929
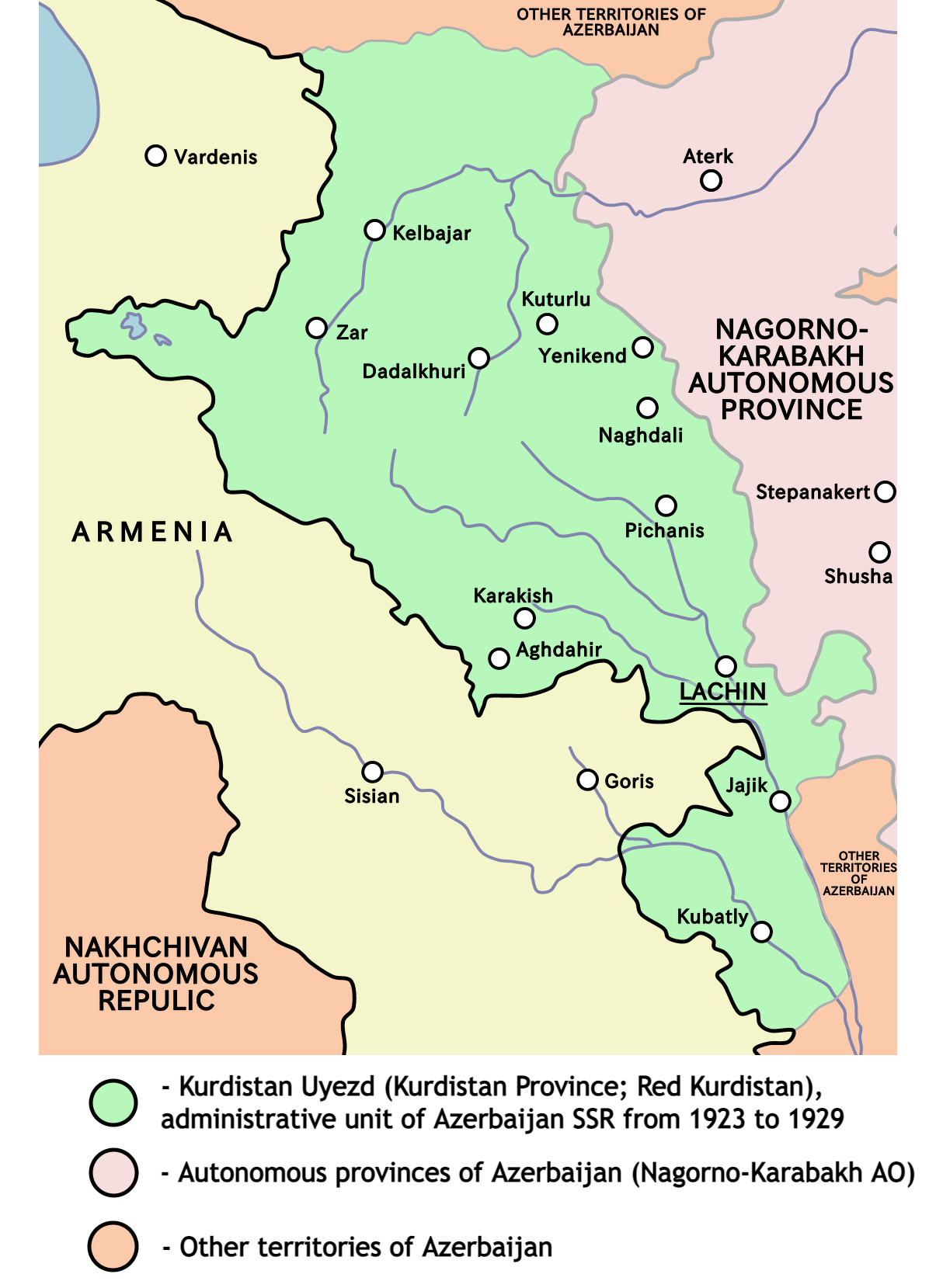
- Capital: Lachin
- Common languages: Kurdish; Azerbaijani; Russian
- Ethnic groups: Kurds; Azeris; Armenians
- Religion: Islam
- Government: Soviet administrative unit
- Historical era: Interwar period
  - Established: 1923
  - Disestablished: 1929

Population
  - Census: 51,426 (1926)
- Currency: Soviet ruble (SUR)
- Today part of: Azerbaijan

Kurdistan Uezd, (Note: Russian: Курдистанский уезд; Azerbaijani: Kürdüstan qəzası; Kurdish: Кӧрдӧйәзд, romanized: Kurduyezd) also known colloquially as Red Kurdistan, (Note: Russian: Красный Курдистан; Azerbaijani: Qızıl Kürdüstan; Kurdish: Кӧрдьстана Сор, Kurdistana Sor) was a Soviet administrative unit within the Azerbaijan SSR that existed for six years from 1923 to 1929 and included the districts of Kalbajar, Lachin, Qubadli and part of Jabrayil. It was part of Azerbaijan SSR, with the administrative center being in Lachin. It was briefly succeeded by the Kurdistan Okrug from 30 May to 23 July 1930.

== History ==
=== Establishment ===
The uezd was established on 7 July 1923, by the order of the government of the Azerbaijani SSR. Sergei Kirov was appointed as its first head. The majority of Kurds in the region were Shia, unlike the Sunni Kurds of the Nakhichevan uezd and other areas of the Middle East. The official language was Kurmanji

A documentary showcasing life in Red Kurdistan

At the 1926 Soviet Census, the uezd had a total population of 51,426 people, with ethnic Kurds constituting 72.3% or 37,182 people. However, according to the same census, 92.5% of the population of the uezd cited Turkic (later known as Azerbaijani) as their native tongue.

=== Dissolution and persecution of Kurds ===
On 8 April 1929, the Sixth Azerbaijani Congress of Soviets approved a reform of the administrative structure, abolishing all uezds, including the Kurdistan uezd. On 30 May 1930, the short-lived Kurdistan Okrug was founded in its place. The okrug was created by the Soviet authorities in order to attract the sympathies of Kurds in neighboring Iran and Turkey and take advantage of Kurdish nationalist movements in those countries. The Soviet Ministry of Foreign Affairs, not wanting to damage relations with Turkey and Iran, protested strongly, leading to a sharp change in policy regarding Kurdish nationalism. Hence, Kurdistan okrug was disbanded on 23 July 1930.

After the dissolution, Kurds continued to assimilate into the dominant culture of the neighbouring Azeris, but some religious Yazidi tribes mostly stayed the same. Historically, mixed Azeri-Kurdish marriages were commonplace; however the Kurdish language was rarely passed on to the children in such marriages.

In the late 1930s, Soviet authorities deported most of the Kurdish population of Azerbaijan and Armenia to Kazakhstan, Turkmenistan, Kyrgyzstan, and Uzbekistan. The Kurds of Georgia also became victims of Joseph Stalin's Great Purge in 1944. Years later, Kurds immigrated to Kazakhstan from the neighbouring countries, Uzbekistan and Kyrgyzstan.

== See also ==
- Kurds in Azerbaijan
- Kurdish Republic of Lachin
- Yekbûn
- Kurds in Russia
- List of Kurdish dynasties and countries
- Kurdish alphabets
