= Shamil Asgarov =

Kurdish scholar (1929–2005)

Shamil Asgarov Şamil Əsgərov
- Born: 1929; Ağcakənd, Kalbajar
- Died: 20 April 2005
- Scientific career
- Fields: Poet, historian

Shamil Asgarov or Shamil Askerov (Azerbaijani: Şamil Səlim oğlu Əsgərov, 1929, Ağcakənd – 20 April 2005, Baku) was an Azerbaijani Kurdish scholar, poet, and researcher on the history of the Kurds in Azerbaijan. He was the leader of Kalbajar's large Kurdish community, owned a 30,000 book library of books about Caucasian Kurds and their history and was the founder and former director of the Kurdish Museum in Kelbajar before that town was occupied by Armenian forces and the former population forced to flee in 1993. He was also editor of the Kurdish newspaper Denge Kurd published from 1991 to 2004 in Baku, Azerbaijan. Shamil Asgarov translated the classic Kurdish love story Mem and Zin into Azerbaijani and was the author of 17 other books among them one, Ferhenge, a Kurdish-Azerbaijani dictionary, was published in 1999 with the support of the Soros Foundation.

Shamil's son, Khalid, a photographer for Reuters, documented the tale of Asgarov's harrowing escape from Kelbajar during the Armenian attacks of spring 1993 on a 2017 radio documentary for the BBC.

== See also ==
- List of Kurdish scholars
