= Bulgarians in Kazakhstan =

Ethnic minority group in Kazakhstan

Българи в Казахстан

Total population
- 5,788 (2023 census)

Languages
- Bulgarian, Kazakh, Russian

Bulgarians in Kazakhstan (Bulgarian: Българи в Казахстан; Kazakh: Қазақстандағы болгарлар, romanized: Qazaqstandağy bolgarlar; Russian: Болгары в Казахстане) are an ethnic minority in Kazakhstan, and make up a small percentage of the population.

== Number and share ==
=== Censuses ===
Number and share of Bulgarians according to the census over the years by regions:

| | Number | | | | | Share (in %) | | | | |
| | 1970 | 1979 | 1989 | 1999 | 2009 | 1970 | 1979 | 1989 | 1999 | 2009 |
|---|---|---|---|---|---|---|---|---|---|---|
| Kazakhstan | 10,420 | 10,064 | 10,228 | 6,915 | 4,523 | 0,080 | 0,068 | 0,063 | 0,046 | 0,028 |
| Akmola Region | 372 | 279 | 286 | 208 | 168 | 0,038 | 0,028 | 0,026 | 0,024 | 0,022 |
| Aktobe Region | 1,241 | 1,267 | 1,457 | 1,045 | 689 | 0,225 | 0,200 | 0,198 | 0,153 | 0,090 |
| Almaty | 297 | 394 | 402 | 273 | 219 | 0,038 | 0,041 | 0,037 | 0,024 | 0,016 |
| Almaty Region | 690 | 621 | 600 | 405 | 239 | 0,054 | 0,042 | 0,036 | 0,025 | 0,013 |
| Astana | 120 | 138 | 147 | 129 | 116 | 0,066 | 0,059 | 0,052 | 0,040 | 0,018 |
| Atyrau Region | 1,264 | 973 | 864 | 436 | 257 | 0,371 | 0,260 | 0,203 | 0,099 | 0,050 |
| East Kazakhstan Region | 988 | 941 | 841 | 524 | 284 | 0,063 | 0,056 | 0,047 | 0,034 | 0,020 |
| Jambyl Region | 305 | 385 | 325 | 114 | 99 | 0,038 | 0,041 | 0,031 | 0,011 | 0,009 |
| Karaganda Region | 2,289 | 2,260 | 2,313 | 1,664 | 1,116 | 0,146 | 0,131 | 0,132 | 0,117 | 0,083 |
| Kostanay Region | 395 | 360 | 459 | 301 | 159 | 0,040 | 0,033 | 0,037 | 0,029 | 0,017 |
| Kyzylorda Region | 50 | 50 | 36 | 16 | 11 | 0,010 | 0,008 | 0,006 | 0,002 | 0,001 |
| Mangystau Region | 88 | 160 | 118 | 79 | 34 | 0,055 | 0,064 | 0,036 | 0,025 | 0,007 |
| North Kazakhstan Region | 123 | 122 | 150 | 101 | 64 | 0,014 | 0,013 | 0,016 | 0,013 | 0,010 |
| Pavlodar Region | 1,510 | 1,419 | 1,544 | 1,300 | 907 | 0,216 | 0,175 | 0,163 | 0,161 | 0,122 |
| South Kazakhstan Region | 498 | 521 | 397 | 183 | 77 | 0,038 | 0,033 | 0,021 | 0,009 | 0,003 |
| West Kazakhstan Region | 190 | 174 | 289 | 137 | 84 | 0,037 | 0,029 | 0,045 | 0,022 | 0,014 |

== Notable people ==
- Oleg Dymov (born 1946), politician

== See also ==
- Bulgaria–Kazakhstan relations
- Bulgarian diaspora
- Demographics of Kazakhstan
