= Kurds in Russia =

Ethnic group in Russia

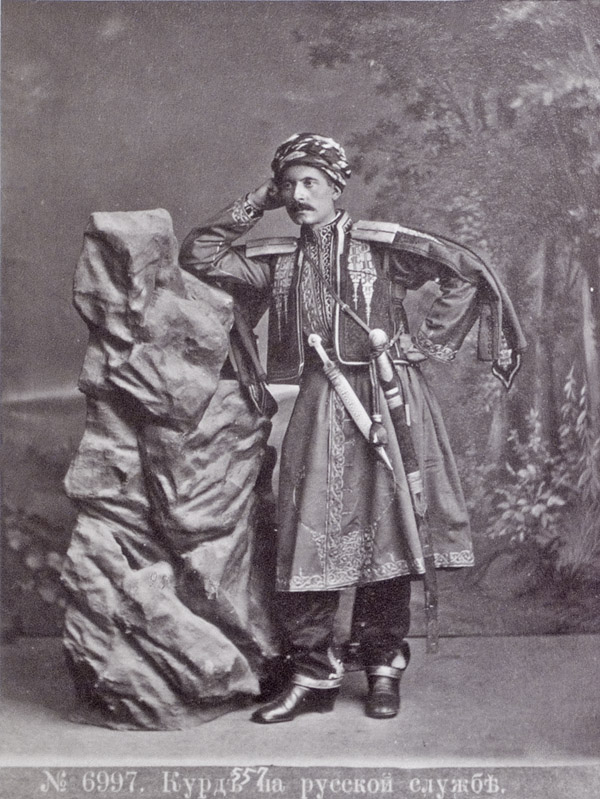
- A Kurdish soldier in Russian service

Total population
- 50,701 (2021)

Regions with significant populations
- Khabarovsk, Krasnodar, Kursk; 10,000 in Moscow (1995)

Languages
- Kurdish (Kurmanji), Russian, Armenian, Georgian

Religion
- Sunni Islam, Shia Islam, Yazidism, Irreligion

Related ethnic groups
- Other Kurds, especially Caucasian Kurds

Kurds in Russia (Russian: Курды в России, romanized: Kurdy v Rossii; Kurdish: Kurdên Rusyayê, کوردانی ڕوسیا) form a major part of the historically significant Kurdish population in the post-Soviet space, with close ties to the Kurdish communities in the Caucasus and Central Asia.

== History ==
During the early 19th century, the main goal of the Russian Empire was to ensure the neutrality of the Kurds in the wars against Persia and the Ottoman Empire. In the beginning of the 19th century, Kurds settled in Transcaucasia, at a time when Transcaucasia was incorporated into the Russian Empire. In the 20th century, Kurds were persecuted and exterminated by the Turks and Persians, a situation that led Kurds to move to Russian Transcaucasia. From 1804–1813 and again in 1826–1828, when the Russian Empire and the Persian Empire were at war, the Russian authorities let Kurds settle in Russia and Armenia. During the Crimean War and the Russo-Turkish War (1877–1878), Kurds moved to Russia and Armenia. According to the Russian Census of 1897, 99,900 Kurds lived in the Russian Empire.

In 1937 and 1944 Soviet Kurds experienced forced deportations from Azerbaijan (mostly), Armenia and Georgia.

During World War II, one of the most renowned Soviet Kurds was Samand Siabandov, a war hero.

Abdullah Öcalan sought asylum in Russia in 1998.

=== Kurdish involvement in the Russo-Ukrainian war ===
According to unofficial data cited by Rudaw in October 2022, more than 100 Kurds had been drafted from Krasnodar region into the Russian armed forces to fight in Ukraine. Turkish media alleged that members of the Kurdistan Workers' Party and the People's Defense Units were fighting as mercenaries for Russian forces. In February 2023, Ukrainian intelligence (HUR) published an intercepted conversation between two alleged operators of Shahed drones during a Russian attack on Ukraine on 10 February. According to HUR, the speakers were communicating in a Kurdish dialect with some Persian words while discussing target coordinates. HUR said the interception could indicate that Kurdish mercenaries with experience operating Shahed drones were assisting Russian forces in Ukraine.

== Population (1897–2021) ==
Kurdish population in Russia according to census statistics from 1897 to 2021:

Year	Population	Notes
1897	113	In European Russia
1926	178	In the Russian SFSR
1939	387	In the Russian SFSR
1959	855	In the Russian SFSR
1979	1,631	In the Russian SFSR
1989	4,724	In the Russian SFSR
2002	50,880	In the Russian Federation
2010	63,818	In the Russian Federation
2021	50,701	In the Russian Federation

== Notable Kurds in Russia ==
- Qanate Kurdo, Kurdish philologist
- Aslan Usoyan, crime boss
- Zara Mgoyan, pop singer
- Mikhail Aloyan, Boxer
- Guram Adzhoyev (1961), Footballer
- Guram Adzhoyev (1995), Footballer
- Aziz Shavershian, Russian-born Australian bodybuilder and internet celebrity

== See also ==
- Kurdistan Uyezd
- Republic of Mahabad
- Kurdistan Region–Russia relations
