= Yekbûn =

- Leader: Mehmet Babayev
- Founded: 1989
- Ideology: Kurdish Nationalism; Republicanism; Secularism

Yekbûn (Sorani Kurdish: یەکبوون) (English: unity) is a Kurdish political organization established by Kurds in the Soviet Union that sought to make Kurdish culture autonomous and establish an autonomous Kurdistan there.

After Perestroika in the 1980s, the cultural efforts and autonomy aspirations of the Soviet Kurds became more evident. Kurds living in all republics united to form Yekbûn in 1989 and worked to re-establish Kurdistan Uyezdi. Soviet authorities began work on the reconstruction of Kurdish autonomy, but with ideological differences. The First Nagorno-Karabakh War, Turkey's intervention, and the disintegration of the USSR prevented the Kurds from establishing autonomous regions.

According to the census results in 1989, a total of 152,717 Kurds lived in the country.

== Pre-Yekbûn autonomy initiatives ==
Following the death of Joseph Stalin in 1953, the policies pursued by the Soviet Kurds gained a wider dimension as their relations with the Kurdish diaspora living in the Middle East and Europe grew. Past exile policies contributed to the development and discussion of ideas for specific regional solutions to the Kurdish issue. The emergence of Soviet Kurdish institutions increased rapidly due to the Soviet policies of the period, which aimed to influence third-world countries.

In early 1961, many Soviet and Kurdish activists traveled to Moscow to negotiate for the reconstruction of the autonomous region based in Lachin, the "Kurdish Autonomous Region". The application also stated that "If the reconstruction of Red Kurdistan is not possible, the establishment of Kurdish autonomy in the territory of Kazakhstan" would be sought. Receiving the delegation, one of the officials of the Central Committee of the Communist Party of the Soviet Union, S. A. Panamaryov, İ. V. Vader and KN Sumanskiy stated that the Soviet Union would not be able to establish a Kurdish autonomy on its own territory during a period of war between Kurds and Arabs in Iraq, and if such a step is taken, global public opinion might shift towards an accusation that the rebellion in Iraq was planned and implemented by the Soviets. However, the authorities made a proposal to lay the groundwork for cultural autonomy in the Soviet republics and stated that they could tackle the issue of Kurdistan autonomy after the war in Iraq was over.

The demand for autonomy also coincided with various situations that led to the dissolution of Khrushchev, such as hostility between Armenia and Azerbaijan stemming from regional and historical issues. In early 1963, a group of Armenian Kurds demanded the re-creation of an autonomous region in Azerbaijan, and held talks with the parliament speaker, Mehmed Iskenderov. The demands were openly rejected and additionally caused uneasiness in the Azerbaijani administration. Soviet Kurds had to maintain a balanced policy between the national rights gained during the Soviet Union and the forced migration phenomenon of the 1930s and 1940s.

== History ==
Kurdistan Uyezdi was founded in 1923.

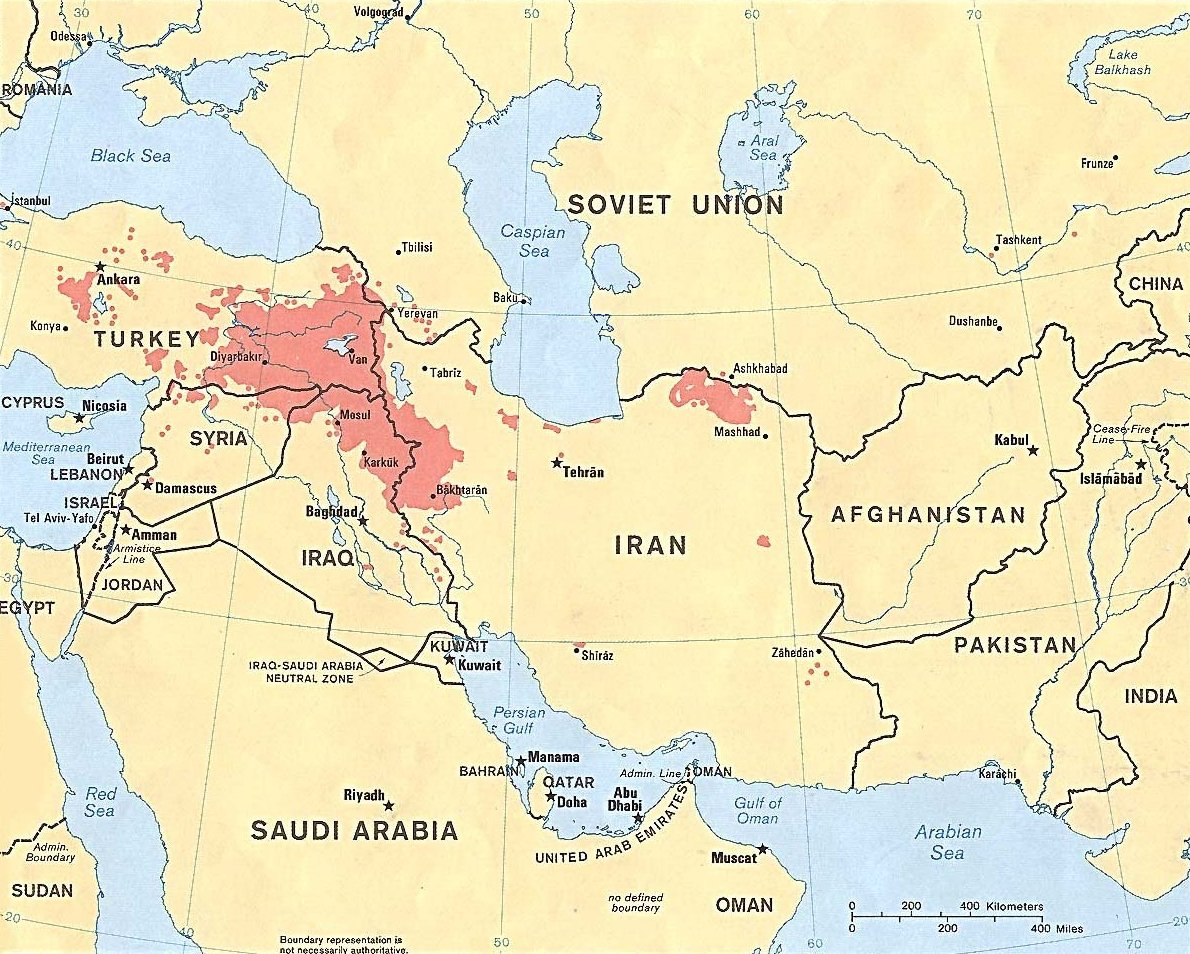
The areas where Kurds lived in the Soviet Union and the Middle East in 1986.

Distribution of the Soviet Kurdish population according to the Soviet republics in 1989. 50.000+ 25.000-50.000 10.000-25.000 1000-10.000 1-1000

Perestroika led to an acceleration of historical research and the emergence of more radical discussions on the national issue among Soviet Kurds than in previous periods. During the discussions, some Soviet Kurds argued that Andropov did not want independence for the Kurds of the Middle East, as Andropov spoke about the Kurds along with his brothers abroad in a speech in December 1982.

During this period, Soviet Kurdish activists began to draw more attention to the Kurdish issue outside of the Soviet Union. Soviet Kurdish activists such as Mehmet Babayev and M. S. Mustafayev decided to hold a rally in Pushkin Square in Moscow before the convention learned that the 1st Congress of the Soviet Union parliament was going to take place on May 25, 1989.

In March 1989, a meeting was held at the house of Knyaze Eliyê Asik in the village of Aşıbulak in Kazakhstan, led by Babeyev and Mustafayev. At the meeting, along with the rally, the goals and objectives of the new Yekbûn organization were discussed.

On May 21, 1989, the Union of Kurds of the Soviet Union, named "Yekb Sovyn", was established with delegates from 9 Soviet republics. Members supported principles such as uniting Kurdish social and cultural organizations in order to prevent assimilation, establishing Soviets in provinces, towns and villages in the regions where Kurds live, continuing the reconstruction works of the abolished Kurdish autonomous region (Kurdistan Uyezdi) and making necessary suggestions and recommendations to the parliament of the Soviet Union to accomplish all of these objectives. However, if the goal of building Kurdish autonomy in the lands where Kurdistan Uyezdi was located could not be achieved, negotiations were to be held for another region where Kurds coexisted in the Soviet Union.

Yekbûn received permission to publish magazines in all republics within the scope of these activities and began publication with the newspaper Kurdistan on September 19, 1991, in Almaty, the capital of Kazakhstan.

While describing "the progressive world of Kurdish militancy", Şakro Mgoi, head of the Kurdish Department of the Armenian Orientalism Institute, was often critical of Soviet rulers' policies regarding Kurds. In the 1990s the increase in the Turkey-PKK conflict along with village evacuations, military operations against Saddam Hussein in Iraq, and tensions between Armenians and Azeris in Nagorno-Karabakh, led to increasing acts of violence against the Kurds in both republics. It led to the unification of Soviet Kurdish activists with the idea that the Kurdish issue should turn out to be a national problem rather than domestic. This was clearly highlighted at the conference in July 1990, which included Kurdish militants and intellectuals from outside the Soviet Union. During this period, many letters were sent to the Soviet authorities criticizing the indifference to Kurds in the Middle East.

Between 1989 and 1990, Kurds from Kazakhstan, Kyrgyzstan, Central Asia and Transcaucasia immigrated to Rostov Oblast, Adige Republic, Krasnodar and Stavropol, which are affiliated with the Russian Soviet Federative Socialist Republic. The Kurdish issue was brought to the agenda at the general meeting of the Central Committee of the Communist Party of the Soviet Union on 20 September 1989. The international conference "USSR Kurds: History and Today's Realities" was held between 25 and 26 September 1990 with the decision of the Central Committee. Branches of the Kurdish Institute of Marxism–Leninism made contributions to the conference of Turkey, Iran, Iraq and Syria in which the Kurds joined representatives from Germany and France. Speaking at the conference, Mehmet Babayev stated that they were insistent on an autonomous region and said:

If our conference does not demand the USSR Presidency and the Soviet government to rebuild Kurdish autonomy, our speeches and speeches here will be in vain. If we cannot achieve autonomy after so many problems and events, we will face total extinction in the Soviet Union. The people who do not have autonomy in the Soviet Union are not considered from the people. Some comrades point out: Let schools be opened, newspapers published and textbooks published in various regions where we live. This is not economically beneficial neither for us nor for the state. The Kurds are scattered throughout the Soviet Union. There are no more than 300 Kurdish families in any province. Will a school or a newspaper be published for every hundred families? We know that a newspaper printed in Yerevan reaches other regions in 10-12 days!

— Mehmet Babayev

As a result of Yekbûn's persistent attempts, Soviet authorities promised to establish a state commission on the rebuilding of Kurdish autonomy, and a special commission of 8 parliamentarians and 4 Kurdish representatives, chaired by the Soviet deputy Vitaliy Sobolev, named "On the Problems of the Kurdish People" convened on 20 November 1990. As the task of the commission, he adopted the principle of "to reveal the facts about Kurdish autonomy bin y examining the archive documents and to determine whether the Kurds need an autonomous republic by doing research in the republics where Kurds live". In May 1991, Mikhail Gorbachev's deputy, G. Revenkov, made the following statement about his positive beliefs for the establishment of the Kurdish autonomous region;

Comrade Gorbachev has greetings to you. He appreciates your work towards rebuilding the autonomous region of Kurdistan. I can already give you the good news that Red Kurdistan will be established. We hope we will declare autonomy in a few months. This issue was also discussed with the Azerbaijani administration. During this time, we need to prepare the people of the region. Look to make good use of state television and the Soviet press to create public opinion. Prepare and mobilize your kinsmen living in different republics.

— G. Revenkov

During this period Yekbûn was divided into two groups as "autonomists" and "culturalists". While "autonomists" argued that autonomy was the only solution, "culturalists" stated that cultural autonomy should be defended. Sharp differences of opinion between the group affected the overall course of the struggle. As a matter of fact, the Soviet Union Supreme Soviet official Refik Nişanov told the delegation of Yekbûn, "First of all, do not come to me without clarifying your views on reviving Red Kurdistan, otherwise we will not be able to solve the problem."

Instead of completing this, it became the beginning of the ideological unity between representatives of Yekbûn, which was done to ensure autonomy in a region that became the Armenian-Azerbaijani conflict, Turkey's government intervention and the Soviet Union's dissolution, the Kurdish autonomous region could not be established. The Caucasus Kurdistan Freedom Movement, which was established in 1992 under the leadership of Deputy Mustafayev, declared the establishment of the Kurdish Republic of Lachin with the support of Russia and Armenia, but failed. (Note: In 2014 the relevant Mustafayev Rudaw in an interview with "Azerbaijan 1991, the Soviet Ace the declared independence from Russia's parliament that they were Turkish, the language ones are Turkish and announced their land in that part of Turkey. Their famous promise "One nation, two states." When Russia and Armenia were uncomfortable with this situation, they asked us to declare Red Kurdistan and they said that they would provide all the necessary support, even weapons. ... Russia is once again friendly with the Kurds for its own interests. he had to develop relations. Russia and Azerbaijan for their safety, and rather than neighboring Turkey, he prefers to be the Red Kurdistan neighbors. Armenia also needed the Caucasus Kurdistan for links with Russia. .. in 1992, we declared the Red Kurdistan Lachin became the capital, and the cities of Kelbajar, Gubedli, Zengile and Jabrayil were also within the borders of the state. Two months later, at the request of Russia, I went to Moscow. We held a meeting about what can be done and our relations with the authority of the skewers. " used expressions.)
