= Nadir Nadirov =

Soviet scientist (1932–2021)

Nadir Nadirov (Kazakh: Нәдір Кәрімұлы Нәдіров, Nádir Kárimuly Nádirov; Russian: Надир Каримович Надиров; 6 January 1932 – 24 August 2021) was a Kurdish engineer from Kazakhstan. He was born in the Nakhichevan Autonomous Soviet Socialist Republic and his family was deported to Kazakhstan in 1933. He was the president of association of Kurds in Kazakhstan (Berbang) and the first vice-president of the Engineering Academy of Kazakhstan. He was also director of the Neft scientific center. In 1992, he went public with the accounts of mass deportation of Kurds in the former Soviet Union during the 1930s and 1940s.

== Books ==
1. N.K. Nadirov, A.P. Popov, Protein from Petroleum, U.S. Joint Publications Research Service, Springfield, Virginia, 1974.
2. N.K. Nadirov, N. S. Nametkin, Podsolevye nefti Prikaspiĭskoĭ vpadiny, 302 pp., Izdvo Nauka Kazakhskoi SSR, 1983.(in Russian)
3. N.K. Nadirov, N. Markovich, Токоферолы и их использование в медицине и сельском хозяйстве, 334 pp., 1991.
4. N.K. Nadirov, Kurds of Kazakhstan, 556 pp., 2003 (in Russian).
5. N.K. Nadirov, Tengiz: more nefti, more problem, 2003, ISBN 9965-405-08-5.
