= Yediyol, Batman =

Village in Batman Province, Turkey

Yediyol
- Village
- Location within Turkey
- Coordinates: 37.956°N 41.131°E
- Country: Turkey
- Province: Batman
- District: Batman
- Population (2021): 54
- Time zone: UTC+3 (TRT)

Yediyol (Kurdish: Tirzoqê; Syriac: Helqāmiyyah) (Note: Also known as Algamı, Alkami, Halkamié, or Helkami.) is a village in the Batman District of Batman Province in Turkey. The village is populated by Kurds of the Reşkotan tribe and had a population of 43 in 2021.

== History ==
Helqāmiyyah (today called Yediyol) was historically inhabited by Syriac Orthodox Christians and Kurdish-speaking Armenians. In the Syriac Orthodox patriarchal register of dues of 1870, it was recorded that the village had 1 household, who paid 5 dues, and did not have a priest. There was a Syriac Orthodox church of Morī Eliyyō. In 1914, it was populated by 300 Syriacs, according to the list presented to the Paris Peace Conference by the Assyro-Chaldean delegation. It was located in the kaza (district) of Beşiri. The Armenians were attacked by the Belek, Bekran, Şegro, and other Kurdish tribes in May 1915 amidst the Armenian genocide.

== Bibliography ==
- Bcheiry, Iskandar (2009). The Syriac Orthodox Patriarchal Register of Dues of 1870: An Unpublished Historical Document from the Late Ottoman Period. Gorgias Press.
- Gaunt, David (2006). Massacres, Resistance, Protectors: Muslim-Christian Relations in Eastern Anatolia during World War I. Gorgias Press.
- Jongerden, Joost; Verheij, Jelle, eds. (2012). Social Relations in Ottoman Diyarbekir, 1870-1915. Brill.
- Kévorkian, Raymond (2011). The Armenian Genocide: A Complete History. I.B. Tauris.
- Temel, Mihemed Seid (2016). Eşîra Reşkotan (in Kurdish). Nûbihar.
