= Yolağzı, Batman =

Village in Batman Province, Turkey

Yolağzı
- Village
- Location within Turkey
- Coordinates: 37.979°N 41.171°E
- Country: Turkey
- Province: Batman
- District: Batman
- Population (2021): 193
- Time zone: UTC+3 (TRT)

Yolağzı (Kurdish: Dawidiyê) (Note: Also known as Davudi, Aşağıdavudi, Yukarıdavudi, Davoudié, Davdi.) is a village in the Batman District of Batman Province in Turkey. The village is populated by Kurds of the Reşkotan tribe and had a population of 193 in 2021.

== History ==
Davudi (today called Yolağzı) was historically inhabited by Kurdish-speaking Syriac Orthodox Christians and Armenians. It was situated in the kaza (district) of Beşiri in the Diyarbekir sanjak in the Diyarbekir vilayet in c. 1900. There were 50 Syriacs in 1914, according to the list presented to the Paris Peace Conference by the Assyro-Chaldean delegation. The Armenians were attacked by the Belek, Bekran, Şegro, and other Kurdish tribes in May 1915 amidst the Armenian genocide.

== Bibliography ==
- Gaunt, David (2006). Massacres, Resistance, Protectors: Muslim-Christian Relations in Eastern Anatolia during World War I. Gorgias Press.
- Jongerden, Joost; Verheij, Jelle, eds. (2012). Social Relations in Ottoman Diyarbekir, 1870-1915. Brill.
- Kévorkian, Raymond (2011). The Armenian Genocide: A Complete History. I.B. Tauris.
- Temel, Mihemed Seid (2016). Eşîra Reşkotan (in Kurdish). Nûbihar.
