= Bıçakçı, Batman =

Village in Batman Province, Turkey

Bıçakçı
- Village
- Location within Turkey
- Coordinates: 37.984°N 41.149°E
- Country: Turkey
- Province: Batman
- District: Batman
- Population (2021): 772
- Time zone: UTC+3 (TRT)

Bıçakçı (Kurdish: Kerikê; Syriac: Kīrḫah) (Note: Also spelt as Kerik, Keruk, or Kirik.) is a village in the Batman District of Batman Province in Turkey. The village is populated by Kurds of the Reşkotan tribe and had a population of 772 in 2021.

The hamlet of Ballıtepe is attached to the village.

== History ==
Kīrḫah (today called Bıçakçı) was historically inhabited by Syriac Orthodox Christians and Kurdish-speaking Armenians. In the Syriac Orthodox patriarchal register of dues of 1870, it was recorded that the village had 6 households, who paid 15 dues, and it did not have a church or a priest. It was located in the kaza of Beşiri. The Armenians were attacked by the Belek, Bekran, Şegro, and other Kurdish tribes in May 1915 amidst the Armenian genocide.

== Bibliography ==
- Bcheiry, Iskandar (2009). The Syriac Orthodox Patriarchal Register of Dues of 1870: An Unpublished Historical Document from the Late Ottoman Period. Gorgias Press.
- Jongerden, Joost; Verheij, Jelle, eds. (2012). Social Relations in Ottoman Diyarbekir, 1870-1915. Brill.
- Kévorkian, Raymond (2011). The Armenian Genocide: A Complete History. I.B. Tauris.
- Temel, Mihemed Seid (2016). Eşîra Reşkotan (in Kurdish). Nûbihar.
