= Yağmurlu =

Yağmurlu (literally "rainy") is a Turkish word that may refer to:

- Yağmurlu, Batman, a village in the district of Batman, Batman Province, Turkey
- Yağmurlu, Gerger, a village in the district of Gerger, Adıyaman Province, Turkey
- Yağmurlu, Kestel
