= Battle of Dimbos =

Battle between the Ottoman Beylik and the Byzantine Empire

- Part of the Byzantine–Ottoman wars
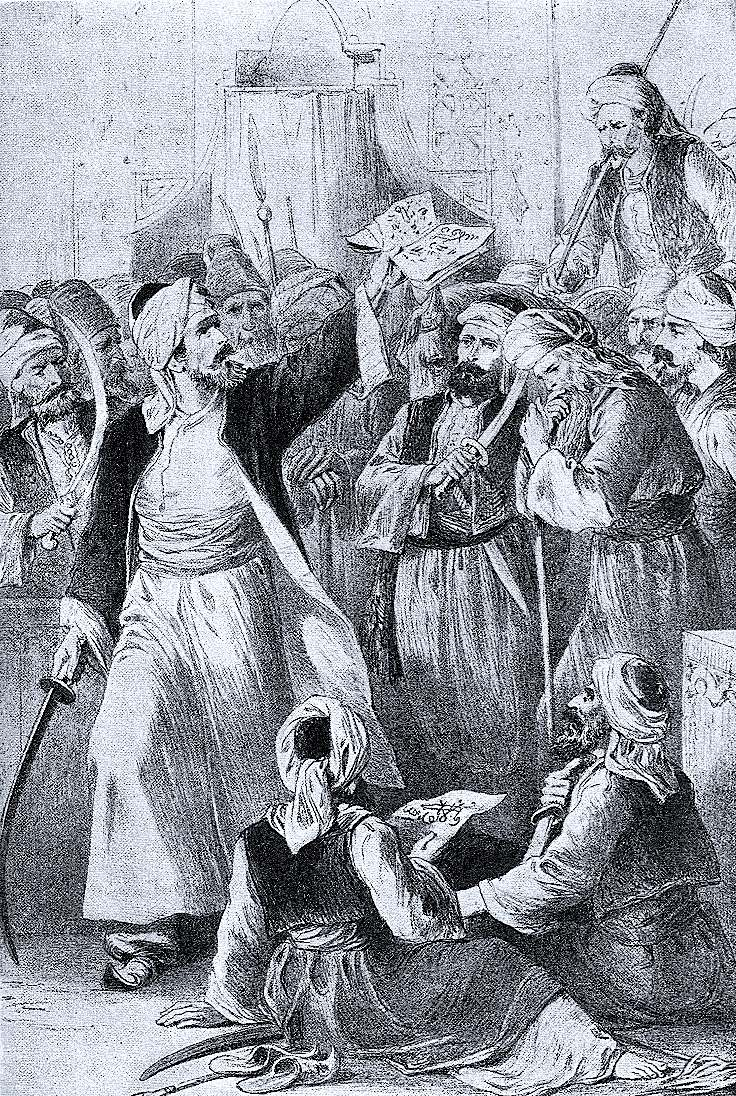
- Drawing showing Turkish leader Osman, (the man holding up a parchment) who is the founder of the Ottoman Empire.
Date	1303
Location	Dimbos, Yenişehir
Result	Ottoman victory

Belligerents
Byzantine Empire	(Ottoman Empire) Ottoman Beylik

Commanders and leaders
(Byzantine Empire) Tekfurs of Bursa, Kite, Kestel, Adranos, Ulubat	(Ottoman Empire) Osman Ghazi (Ottoman Empire) Orhan Ghazi

The Battle of Dinboz or Dimbos (Turkish: Dimbos Muharebesi) took place between the Ottoman Beylik (later Ottoman Empire) and the Byzantine Empire in 1303.

== Background ==
After the battle of Bapheus in 1302, Turkish gazi warriors from all parts of Anatolia began raiding Byzantine territories. Byzantine emperor Andronikos II Palaiologos tried to form an alliance with the Ilkhanid Mongols against the Ottoman Turkish threat. He even offered a political marriage to Mahmud Ghazan. The recent Mongol defeat at Marj al-Saffar and the rapid decentralization of Mongol domains in Anatolia and the Middle East made him decline. Realizing that he was losing his hold on the frontiers, he decided to attack the Ottoman Turks with his own army.

== Battle ==
The battle is known only through later traditions which include semi-legendary elements, and hence probably reflects more folk tradition than actual historical events. According to Theodore Spandounes, "Dimbos" (in Greek) or "Dinboz" (deriving from din bozmak, "change of faith") was the first Byzantine town to fall to the Ottomans. The 15th-century chronicler Aşıkpaşazade drew on accounts of another battle near Koyunhisar (Battle of Bapheus) from other chronicles and moved them to the vicinity Dimbos to form his account of the "Battle of Dinboz".

The Anatolian host of the Byzantine Empire was composed of the forces of local garrisons like Adranos (modern Orhaneli), Bidnos, Kestel (modern village Erdoğan) and Kete (modern village of Ürünlü). In the spring of 1303, the Byzantine army gathered in Bursa and advanced to Yenişehir, the capital of the Ottoman Turks which was north east of the city. Their goal was to relieve the major city of Nicea which was currently under siege by Osman I who moved west when he heard the news. The two armies met near the mountain pass of Dimbos on the way to Yenişehir which alleviated the Byzantine numerical superiority. During the battle both sides suffered heavy casualties. On the Ottoman side, Osman's nephew Aydoğdu and on the Byzantine side the governors of Kestel and Dimbos were among the losses. As the Byzantines started to tire, the Ottoman Turkish cavalry under Orhan forced them into an organised retreat which achieved the Ottoman victory.

== Aftermath ==
The Tekfur of Kite tried to escape to nearby Lopádion (modern Ulubat) fort once his force was routed by the akinji. Osman caught him before he could do so and he was arrested. After he was executed in front of the fort it subsequently surrendered and was integrated into the domains of the Ottoman Turks. Ulubat and Kestel would follow suit. This battle would be a major catalyst for the Siege of Bursa.
