= Kocalar =

Kocalar can refer to:

- Kocalar, Bismil
- Kocalar, Çanakkale
- Kocalar, Kızılcahamam
