= Yeşilöz, Batman =

Village in Batman Province, Turkey

Yeşilöz
- Village
- Location within Turkey
- Coordinates: 37.968°N 41.202°E
- Country: Turkey
- Province: Batman
- District: Batman
- Population (2021): 141
- Time zone: UTC+3 (TRT)

Yeşilöz (Kurdish: Gundikê Qêre, Çemê Reşo) (Note: Also known as Gündük or Gounduk.) is a village in the Batman District of Batman Province in Turkey. The village is populated by Kurds of the Bekiran and Reşkotan tribes and had a population of 141 in 2021.

== History ==
Gündük (today called Yeşilöz) was historically inhabited by Armenians.

== Bibliography ==
- Bekiran, Mehmet Fatih (2018). Bekiran Aşireti Tarihi (in Turkish). Berikan Yayınları.
- Jongerden, Joost; Verheij, Jelle, eds. (2012). Social Relations in Ottoman Diyarbekir, 1870-1915. Brill.
- Temel, Mihemed Seid (2016). Eşîra Reşkotan (in Kurdish). Nûbihar.
