= Arıkgöl, Bismil =

Village in Turkey

Arıkgöl
- Neighbourhood
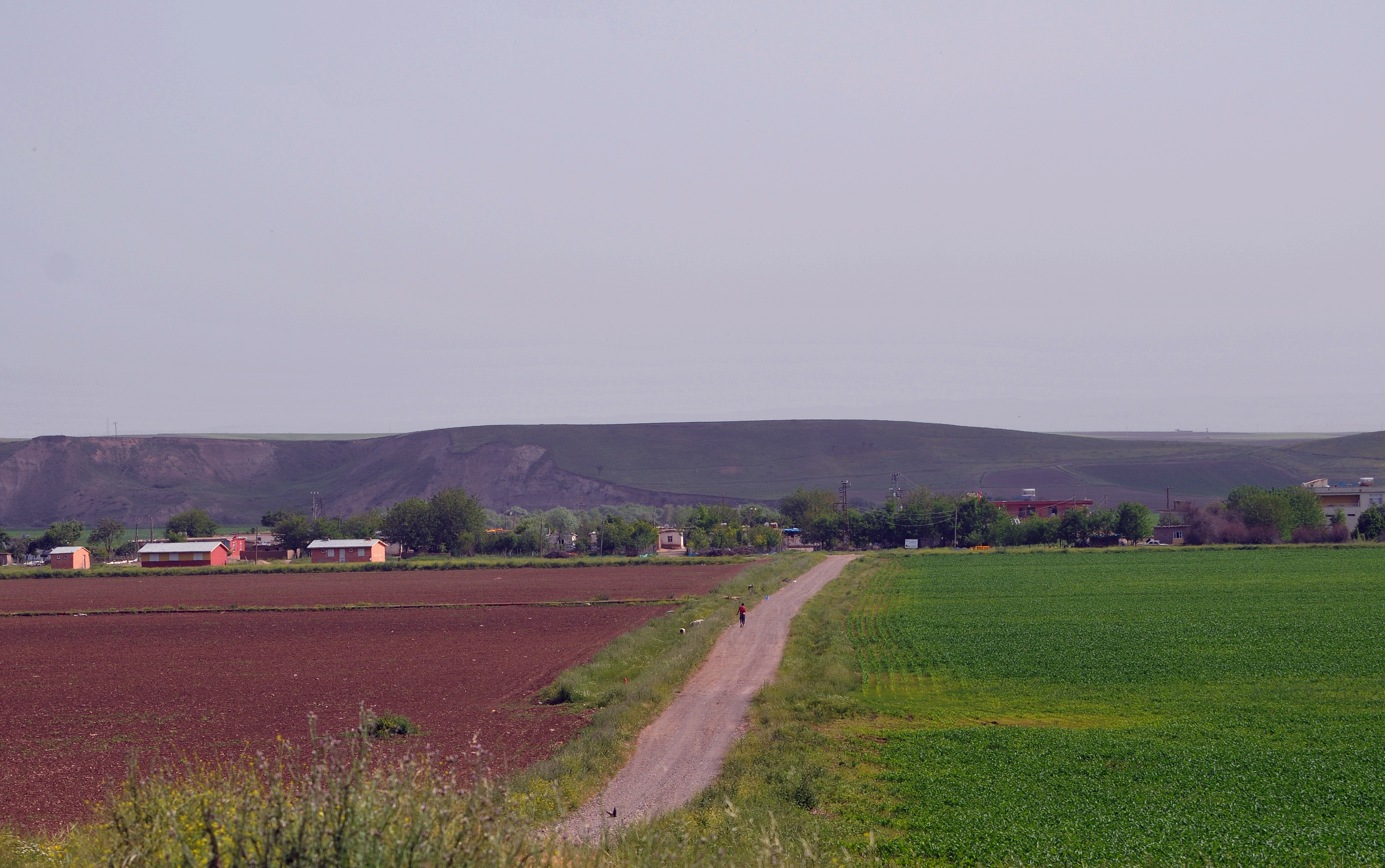

- Location within Turkey
- Coordinates: 37°50′N 40°51′E
- Country: Turkey
- Province: Diyarbakır
- District: Bismil
- Population (2022): 103
- Time zone: UTC+3 (TRT)

Arıkgöl (Kurdish: Gundê Evdî) (Note: Also known as Gunda-Abdi, Gündiabdi, and Gündüabdi.) is a neighbourhood in the municipality and district of Bismil, Diyarbakır Province in Turkey. It is populated by Kurds and had a population of 103 in 2022.

== History ==
Gunda-Abdi (today called Arıkgöl) was historically inhabited by Syriac Orthodox Christians. It was located in the kaza (district) of Silvan in the Diyarbakır sanjak in the Diyarbekir vilayet in c. 1900. In 1914, it was populated by 100 Syriacs, according to the list presented to the Paris Peace Conference by the Assyro-Chaldean delegation. By 1914, it was situated in the Bafaya nahiyah (commune) of the kaza of Beşiri. No survivors of the Sayfo are attested from this area.

== Bibliography ==
- Gaunt, David (2006). Massacres, Resistance, Protectors: Muslim-Christian Relations in Eastern Anatolia during World War I. Gorgias Press.
- Jongerden, Joost; Verheij, Jelle, eds. (2012). Social Relations in Ottoman Diyarbekir, 1870-1915. Brill.
- Tîgrîs, Amed; Çakar, Yıldız (2012). Amed : erdnîgarî, dîrok, çand (in Kurdish).
