= Çevrimova, Batman =

Village in Batman Province, Turkey

Çevrimova
- Village
- Location within Turkey
- Coordinates: 37.839°N 41.271°E
- Country: Turkey
- Province: Batman
- District: Batman
- Population (2021): 1,056
- Time zone: UTC+3 (TRT)

Çevrimova (Kurdish: Barisil; Syriac: Bāreṣel) (Note: Also known as Barısıl, Barsil, Barsıl, Barousli, Baresèl, Barsel, Barusli, or Baresel.) is a village in the Batman District of Batman Province in Turkey. The village is populated by Kurds of the Elîkan, Reman and Sinikan tribes and had a population of 1,056 in 2021.

== History ==
Bāreṣel (today called Çevrimova) was historically inhabited by Syriac Orthodox Christians and Kurdish-speaking Armenians. In the Syriac Orthodox patriarchal register of dues of 1870, it was recorded that the village had 14 households, who paid 47 dues, and did not have a church or a priest. There were 15 Armenian hearths in 1880.

It was populated by 120 Syriacs in 1914, according to the list presented to the Paris Peace Conference by the Assyro-Chaldean delegation. It was located in the kaza (district) of Beşiri. The Armenians were attacked by the Belek, Bekran, Şegro, and other Kurdish tribes in May 1915 amidst the Armenian genocide.

== Bibliography ==
- Bcheiry, Iskandar (2009). The Syriac Orthodox Patriarchal Register of Dues of 1870: An Unpublished Historical Document from the Late Ottoman Period. Gorgias Press.
- Gaunt, David (2006). Massacres, Resistance, Protectors: Muslim-Christian Relations in Eastern Anatolia during World War I. Gorgias Press.
- Jongerden, Joost; Verheij, Jelle, eds. (2012). Social Relations in Ottoman Diyarbekir, 1870-1915. Brill.
- Kévorkian, Raymond H. (2006). "Demographic Changes in the Armenian Population of Diarbekir, 1895-1914". In Richard G. Hovannisian (ed.). Armenian Tigranakert/Diarbekir and Edessa/Urfa. Mazda Publishers.
- Kévorkian, Raymond (2011). The Armenian Genocide: A Complete History. I.B. Tauris.
