= Çayüstü =

Çayüstü can refer to the following villages in Turkey:

- Çayüstü, Batman
- Çayüstü, Bigadiç
- Çayüstü, Dinar
- Çayüstü, Oltu
- Çayüstü, Suluova
