= Güvercin, Batman =

Village in Batman Province, Turkey

Güvercin
- Village
- Location within Turkey
- Coordinates: 37.933°N 41.172°E
- Country: Turkey
- Province: Batman
- District: Batman
- Population (2021): 245
- Time zone: UTC+3 (TRT)

Güvercin (Kurdish: Emso; Syriac: ʿAmsū) (Note: Also known as Bé-Khamsa, Be-Khamse, Deir-Hamza, or Derke-Amo.) is a village in the Batman District of Batman Province in Turkey. The village is populated by Kurds of the Receban tribe and had a population of 245 in 2021. It is located on the southern slopes of the Ashita-Dagh.

== History ==
ʿAmsū (today called Güvercin) was historically inhabited by Syriac Orthodox Christians and Kurdish-speaking Armenians. In the Syriac Orthodox patriarchal register of dues of 1870, it was recorded that the village had one household, who paid ten dues, and did not have a church or a priest. There were eight Armenian hearths in 1880. It was located in the kaza of Beşiri. The Armenians were attacked by the Belek, Bekran, Şegro, and other Kurdish tribes in May 1915 amidst the Armenian genocide.

== Bibliography ==
- Bcheiry, Iskandar (2009). The Syriac Orthodox Patriarchal Register of Dues of 1870: An Unpublished Historical Document from the Late Ottoman Period. Gorgias Press.
- Bcheiry, Iskandar (2019). "Digitizing and Schematizing the Archival Material from the Late Ottoman Period Found in the Monastery of al-Zaʿfarān in Southeast Turkey". Atla Summary of Proceedings. 72 (January): 50–61. doi:10.31046/proceedings.2018.113.
- Jongerden, Joost; Verheij, Jelle, eds. (2012). Social Relations in Ottoman Diyarbekir, 1870-1915. Brill.
- Kévorkian, Raymond H. (2006). "Demographic Changes in the Armenian Population of Diarbekir, 1895-1914". In Richard G. Hovannisian (ed.). Armenian Tigranakert/Diarbekir and Edessa/Urfa. Mazda Publishers.
- Kévorkian, Raymond (2011). The Armenian Genocide: A Complete History. I.B. Tauris.
