= Başur Höyük =

- Location within Turkey
- 37°48′58″N 41°46′44″E
- Type: settlement
- Periods: Neolithic, Chalcolithic, Bronze Age
- Location: Siirt Province, Turkey

History
- Built: 4th millennium BC

Site notes
- Excavation dates: 2007-2019
- Archaeologists: Haluk Sağlamtimur
- Condition: Ruined
- Owner: Public
- Public access: Yes

Başur Höyük (pronounced as Bashur) in Turkey's south-eastern Siirt Province is a 5,000-year-old Bronze Age burial site. It is located just outside the city of Siirt near the village of Aktaş in a valley of the upper Tigris River, adjacent to the Başur River. The 820-foot by 492-foot burial mound was excavated in the years up to 2018, by Brenna Hassett of the Natural History Museum in London, and Haluk Sağlamtimur of Ege University in Turkey.

== Archaeology ==
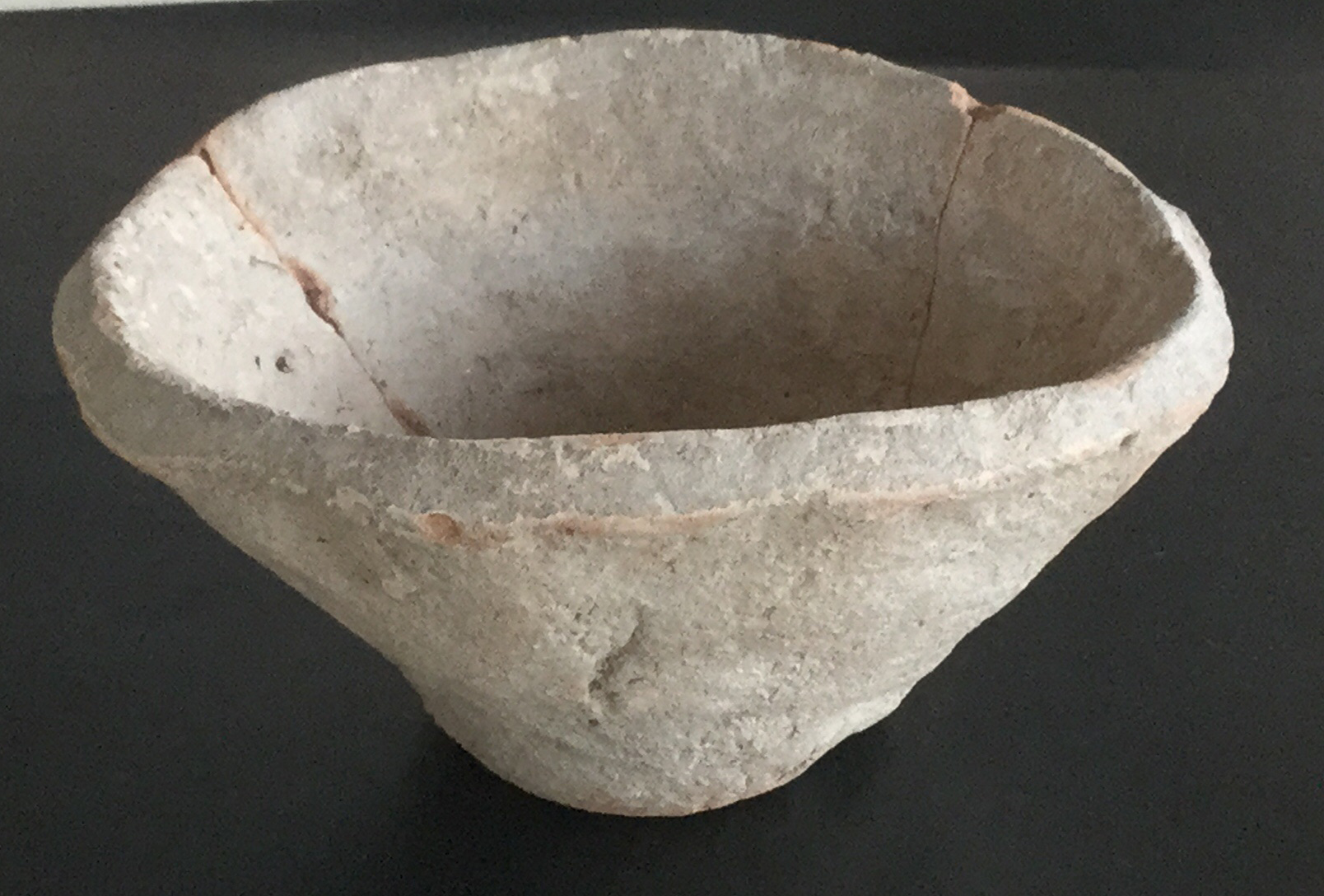
Uruk-period beveled rim bowl, c. 3400–3200 BC, from Habuba Kabira South in Syria

The site of Başur Höyük consists of a 150-meter by 250-meter mound with 15 meters of occupation remains. It was excavated from 2007 to 2019 by a team led by Haluk Sağlamtimur as part of the rescue archaeology associated with the construction of the Ilısu Dam. Pottery shards date back to the 7th millennium BC with three occupation layers dating from the 4th millennium BC Late Chalcolithic 5 Late Uruk period, 2nd millennium BC Middle Bronze period, and the Medieval period. A Uruk period settlement on the south part of the mound later became an Early Bronze I burial site. The Late Uruk settlement was surrounded by a fortification wall with stone foundations and included a monumental building. Finds included thousands of bevelled rim bowls.

== History ==
According to the archaeologists, the mound was already inhabited during the Neolithic period. The population increased during the Late Chalcolithic period. For that time, the evidence of local Anatolian material culture has been documented. Later on, the presence of Uruk influences is seen, including some central administration. This is indicated by the excavated cylinder seals, many mass-produced beveled-rim bowls, and multi-roomed buildings and storerooms.

== Early Dynastic cemetery ==
The partial excavation of the cemetery found 18 burials (pit graves), cist graves (walled - sided and floored with stone slaba, and semi-walled - using one wall of a cist grave) and inhumations ("death pit"). No matching Early Dynastic was found during the rescue excavation. Large numbers of metal weapons and ritual items were found, as well as cylinder seals.

One tomb contained the remains of two 12-year-old children and the remains of an adult, which may have been reburied. The remains of eight other people aged 11 to 20 were found buried outside the tomb. These remains were carbon-dated to between 3100 and 2800 BC, and at least some of the people are believed to have been sacrificed.

=== Grave goods ===
Along with the children's bodies were buried hundreds of bronze spearheads, while the bodies outside the tomb were buried with textiles, beads, and ceramics, and at least some of the people are believed to have been sacrificed.

Overall, the graves revealed a unique treasure made of painted and unpainted pottery, bronze spearheads, various ritual artifacts, seals with geometric motifs, and about 300 well-preserved amorphous bronze artifacts. The majority of pots featured bitumen residues. Tens of thousands of beads made of mountain crystal and other types of stones were also recovered from the burials.

The excavation also found 49 small pieces of stone elaborately sculpted in different shapes and painted in green, red, blue, black, and white. "Some depict pigs, dogs, and pyramids, others feature round and bullet shapes. We also found dice as well as three circular tokens made of white shell and topped with a black round stone," stated Haluk Sağlamtimur of Ege University. The stone pieces are therefore believed to be a set of gaming pieces, thereby confirming that board games probably originated in the Fertile Crescent regions and Egypt more than 5,000 years ago. The stones were accompanied by badly preserved wooden pieces. Similar pieces were found in settlement mounds in Tell Brak in north-eastern Syria, and Jemdet Nasr in Iraq, but those were believed to be counting stones.

Marcella Frangipane, a professor of prehistoric archaeology at Rome's La Sapienza, has stated that: "The findings at Başur Höyük add to our knowledge as they reveal a coexistence of traditions and a continuity of relationships between the settlements in the northern mountains and the Mesopotamia sites."

=== Human sacrifice ===
Archaeologists Hassett and Sağlamtimur speculate that the eight people buried outside the tomb may have been sacrificed, possibly as “retainers” to serve the others in the afterlife. Brenna has stated that: 'It is unlikely that these children and young people were killed in a massacre or conflict. The careful positioning of the bodies and the evidence of violent death suggest that these burials fit the same pattern of human sacrifice seen at other sites in the region. The burial has parallels with the elaborate burials from the Royal Cemetery of Ur."

The site at Başur Höyük is believed to be 500 years older than the Royal Cemetery of Ur, the elaborate tombs where Mesopotamian rulers were laid to rest. In the Royal Cemetery of Ur, hundreds of burials were identified as sacrifices.

The burials show evidence of large political and social upheavals around this time, when early states were forming in southwest Asia. Brenna, therefore, thinks that sacrifices like this one were a way of controlling a city or state's population.

Further excavations have revealed a series of other burials at the site, including a mass death pit containing at least fifty individuals who were buried simultaneously.

== Parallels with Arslantepe and metal trade ==
Numerous cultural parallels between Basur Hoyuk and Arslantepe have been documented. As in Arslantepe, after the end of the Uruk-related settlement at Basur Hoyuk, a cemetery was established among the abandoned structures on the mound. It was radiocarbon dated to the same time period of 3100–2900 BC. About 1,000 metal objects, mostly copper, were found at Basur, many of them very similar to those at Arslantepe. There are also similarities in tools and ornaments.

In addition, according to Martina Massimino (2023),

"Başur Höyük’s funerary assemblage exhibits evidence of contacts with the neighbouring communities of Mesopotamia to the south, the Euphrates valley to the west, and the Caucasus to the north. The composite picture is particularly evident in the ceramic repertoire. The larger ceramic group bears the peculiar geometric decoration painted in dark red/brown, which is typical of the initial phases of the Ninevite V horizon of northern Mesopotamia."

Thus, the same group present both at Basur and at Arslantepe, as well as in many other places in Anatolia, may have been responsible for the flourishing metal trade during this period. The archaeological evidence indicates clear connections with the Maikop-Novosvobodnaya kurgans culture.

== See also ==
- Batman Museum
- Cities of the ancient Near East
