= Suçeken, Batman =

Village in Batman Province, Turkey

Suçeken
- Village
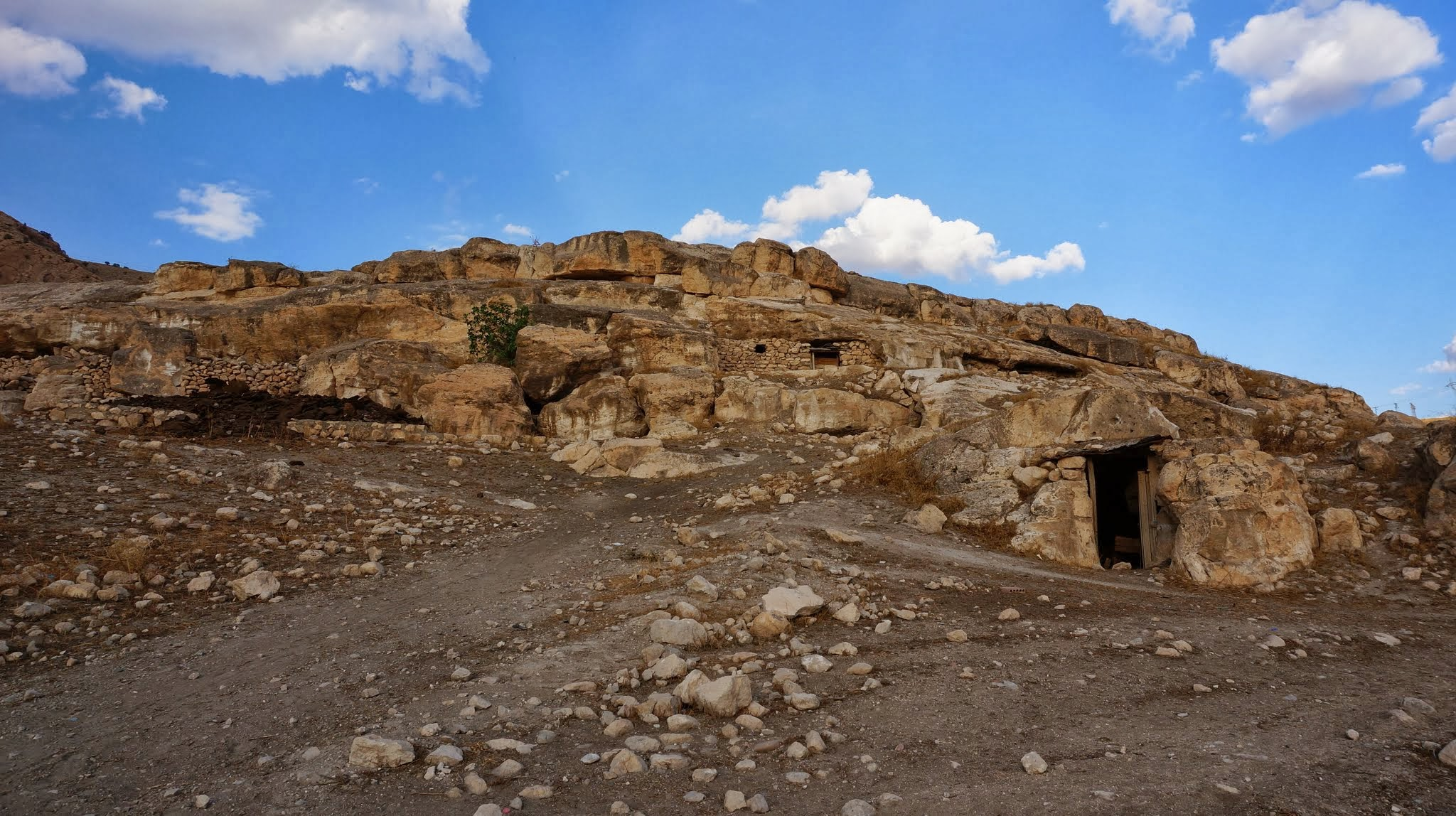

- Location within Turkey
- Coordinates: 37.735°N 41.308°E
- Country: Turkey
- Province: Batman
- District: Batman
- Population (2021): 385
- Time zone: UTC+3 (TRT)

Suçeken (Kurdish: Şikeftan; Syriac: Eškaftah) is a village in the Batman District of Batman Province in Turkey. The village is populated by Kurds of the Reman tribe and had a population of 385 in 2021.

== History ==
Eškaftah (today called Suçeken) was historically inhabited by Syriac Orthodox Christians. In the Syriac Orthodox patriarchal register of dues of 1870, it was recorded that Eškaftah had 3 households, and with Mamūniyyah paid 30 dues. It was located in the district of Beşiri.

== Bibliography ==
- Bcheiry, Iskandar (2009). The Syriac Orthodox Patriarchal Register of Dues of 1870: An Unpublished Historical Document from the Late Ottoman Period. Gorgias Press.
- Tan, Altan (2018). Turabidin'den Berriye'ye. Aşiretler - Dinler - Diller - Kültürler (in Turkish). Pak Ajans Yayincilik Turizm Ve Diş Ticaret Limited şirketi. ISBN 9789944360944.
