= Binatlı, Batman =

Village in Batman Province, Turkey

Binatlı
- Village
- Location within Turkey
- Coordinates: 37.847°N 41.216°E
- Country: Turkey
- Province: Batman
- District: Batman
- Population (2021): 2,377
- Time zone: UTC+3 (TRT)

Binatlı (Kurdish: Bilêyder; (Note: Also spelt as Bileyden or Bileyder.) Syriac: Blīdar) (Note: Also known as Bladour, Bladur, Blédar, Bledar, or Pletar.) is a village in the Batman District of Batman Province in Turkey. The village is populated by Kurds of the Reman and Sinikan tribes and had a population of 2,377 in 2021.

The hamlets of Best, Hanlı and Kolbaşı are attached to the village.

== History ==
Blīdar (today called Binatlı) was historically inhabited by Syriac Orthodox Christians and Kurdish-speaking Armenians. In the Syriac Orthodox patriarchal register of dues of 1870, it was recorded that the village had 3 households, who paid 15 dues, and did not have a church or a priest. There were 50 Armenian hearths in 1880. There was an Armenian church. It is tentatively identified with the village of Blior, which was populated by 100 Syriacs in 1914, according to the list presented to the Paris Peace Conference by the Assyro-Chaldean delegation. It was located in the kaza of Beşiri. The Armenians were attacked by the Belek, Bekran, Şegro, and other Kurdish tribes in May 1915 amidst the Armenian genocide.

== Notable people ==
- Karapetê Xaço (d. 2005), Armenian singer

== Bibliography ==
- Bcheiry, Iskandar (2009). The Syriac Orthodox Patriarchal Register of Dues of 1870: An Unpublished Historical Document from the Late Ottoman Period. Gorgias Press.
- Gaunt, David (2006). Massacres, Resistance, Protectors: Muslim-Christian Relations in Eastern Anatolia during World War I. Gorgias Press.
- Jongerden, Joost; Verheij, Jelle, eds. (2012). Social Relations in Ottoman Diyarbekir, 1870-1915. Brill.
- Kévorkian, Raymond H. (2006). "Demographic Changes in the Armenian Population of Diarbekir, 1895-1914". In Richard G. Hovannisian (ed.). Armenian Tigranakert/Diarbekir and Edessa/Urfa. Mazda Publishers. pp. 250–284.
- Kévorkian, Raymond (2011). The Armenian Genocide: A Complete History. I.B. Tauris.
