= Kayabağı =

Kayabağı can refer to the following villages in Turkey:

- Kayabağı, Batman
- Kayabağı, Daday
