= Davutlar, Bismil =

Village in Turkey

Davutlar
- Settlement
- Location in Turkey
- Coordinates: 37.82817°N 40.89021°E
- Country: Turkey
- Province: Diyarbakır
- District: Bismil
- Time zone: UTC+3 (TRT)

Davutlar (Note: Formerly known as Mola-Davouda, Mulladavudan, and Molladavudan.) is a hamlet in the district of Bismil, Diyarbakır Province in Turkey.

== History ==
Mola-Davouda (today called Davutlar) was historically inhabited by Syriac Orthodox Christians. It was located in the kaza (district) of Silvan in the Diyarbekir sanjak in the Diyarbekir vilayet in c. 1900. In 1914, it was populated by 50 Syriacs, according to the list presented to the Paris Peace Conference by the Assyro-Chaldean delegation. By 1914, it was situated in the Bafaya nahiyah (commune) of the kaza of Beşiri. No survivors of the Sayfo are attested from this area.

== Bibliography ==
- Gaunt, David (2006). Massacres, Resistance, Protectors: Muslim-Christian Relations in Eastern Anatolia during World War I. Gorgias Press.
- Jongerden, Joost; Verheij, Jelle, eds. (2012). Social Relations in Ottoman Diyarbekir, 1870-1915. Brill.
