= Balpınar =

Balpınar can refer to:

- Balpınar, Batman
- Balpınar, Elâzığ
