= Kösetarla, Batman =

Village in Batman Province, Turkey

Kösetarla
- Village
- Location within Turkey
- Coordinates: 37.893°N 41.200°E
- Country: Turkey
- Province: Batman
- District: Batman
- Population (2021): 670
- Time zone: UTC+3 (TRT)

Kösetarla (Kurdish: Krediye; Syriac: Al-Krīdiyyah) (Note: Also known as Kiredi, Kireydi, Kiridi, Kiridié, Krédi-K’ertig, or Kredi-Kertig.) is a village in the Batman District of Batman Province in Turkey. The village is populated by Kurds of the Sinikan tribe and had a population of 670 in 2021.

The hamlet of Kumtepe is attached to the village.

== History ==
Al-Krīdiyyah (today called Kösetarla) was historically inhabited by Syriac Orthodox Christians and Kurdish-speaking Armenians. In the Syriac Orthodox patriarchal register of dues of 1870, it was recorded that the village had 6 households, who paid 13 dues, and did not have a church or a priest. There were 60 Armenian hearths in 1880. There was an Armenian church of Surb Karapet. In 1914, it was populated by 200 Syriacs, according to the list presented to the Paris Peace Conference by the Assyro-Chaldean delegation. It was located in the kaza of Beşiri. The Armenians were attacked by the Belek, Bekran, Şegro, and other Kurdish tribes in May 1915 amidst the Armenian genocide.

== Bibliography ==
- Bcheiry, Iskandar (2009). The Syriac Orthodox Patriarchal Register of Dues of 1870: An Unpublished Historical Document from the Late Ottoman Period. Gorgias Press.
- Bcheiry, Iskandar (2019). "Digitizing and Schematizing the Archival Material from the Late Ottoman Period Found in the Monastery of al-Zaʿfarān in Southeast Turkey". Atla Summary of Proceedings. 72 (January): 50–61. doi:10.31046/proceedings.2018.113.
- Gaunt, David (2006). Massacres, Resistance, Protectors: Muslim-Christian Relations in Eastern Anatolia during World War I. Gorgias Press.
- Jongerden, Joost; Verheij, Jelle, eds. (2012). Social Relations in Ottoman Diyarbekir, 1870-1915. Brill.
- Kévorkian, Raymond H. (2006). "Demographic Changes in the Armenian Population of Diarbekir, 1895-1914". In Richard G. Hovannisian (ed.). Armenian Tigranakert/Diarbekir and Edessa/Urfa. Mazda Publishers. pp. 250–284.
- Kévorkian, Raymond (2011). The Armenian Genocide: A Complete History. I.B. Tauris.
