= Demirbilek, Batman =

Village in Batman Province, Turkey

Demirbilek
- Village
- Location within Turkey
- Coordinates: 37.785°N 41.239°E
- Country: Turkey
- Province: Batman
- District: Batman
- Population (2021): 93
- Time zone: UTC+3 (TRT)

Demirbilek (Kurdish: Meymuniye; Syriac: Mamūniyyah) (Note: Alternatively transliterated as Maymuni, Memounia, or Meymuni.) is a village in the Batman District of Batman Province in Turkey. The village is populated by Kurds of the Reman tribe and had a population of 93 in 2021.

== History ==
Mamūniyyah (today called Demirbilek) was historically inhabited by Syriac Orthodox Christians. In the Syriac Orthodox patriarchal register of dues of 1870, it was recorded that Mamūniyyah with Eškaftah paid 30 dues and was served by one priest. It had a church. In 1914, it was populated by 200 Syriacs, according to the list presented to the Paris Peace Conference by the Assyro-Chaldean delegation. The village was located in the kaza (district) of Beşiri.

== Bibliography ==
- Bcheiry, Iskandar (2009). The Syriac Orthodox Patriarchal Register of Dues of 1870: An Unpublished Historical Document from the Late Ottoman Period. Gorgias Press.
- Gaunt, David (2006). Massacres, Resistance, Protectors: Muslim-Christian Relations in Eastern Anatolia during World War I. Gorgias Press.
- Jongerden, Joost; Verheij, Jelle, eds. (2012). Social Relations in Ottoman Diyarbekir, 1870-1915. Brill.
- Tan, Altan (2018). Turabidin'den Berriye'ye. Aşiretler - Dinler - Diller - Kültürler (in Turkish). Pak Ajans Yayincilik Turizm Ve Diş Ticaret Limited şirketi. ISBN 9789944360944.
