= Akça (disambiguation) =

Akça is an island off Izmir in Turkey.

Akça may also refer to:

== Places ==
- Akça, Dinar, a village in Afyonkarahisar Province, Turkey
- Akça, Kemah, a Village in Erzincan Province, Turkey
- Akça, Batman, a village in Batman Province, Turkey

== People with the surname ==
- Murat Akça (born 1992), Turkish footballer
