= Diktepe, Batman =

Village in Batman Province, Turkey

Diktepe
- Village
- Location within Turkey
- Coordinates: 37.919°N 41.061°E
- Country: Turkey
- Province: Batman
- District: Batman
- Population (2021): 776
- Time zone: UTC+3 (TRT)

Diktepe (Kurdish: Xincika) is a village in the Batman District of Batman Province in Turkey. The village is populated by Kurds and had a population of 776 in 2021.

The hamlet of Yeniköy is attached to the village.
