= Babasultan, Kestel =

Village in Turkey

Babasultan
- Neighbourhood
- Location in Turkey Babasultan (Marmara)
- Coordinates: 40°07′N 29°22′E
- Country: Turkey
- Province: Bursa
- District: Kestel
- Population (2022): 844
- Time zone: UTC+3 (TRT)

Babasultan is a neighbourhood in the municipality and district of Kestel, Bursa Province in Turkey. Its population is 844 (2022).
