= Akça, Batman =

Village in Batman Province, Turkey

Akça
- Village
- Location within Turkey
- Coordinates: 37.854°N 41.185°E
- Country: Turkey
- Province: Batman
- District: Batman
- Population (2021): 506
- Time zone: UTC+3 (TRT)

Akça (Kurdish: Tilmiz; Syriac: Talmis) (Note: Alternatively transliterated as Tilmis.) is a village in the Batman District of Batman Province in Turkey. The village is populated by Kurds of the Receban tribe and had a population of 506 in 2021.

== History ==
Talmis (today called Akça) was historically inhabited by Syriac Orthodox Christians and Armenians. In the Syriac Orthodox patriarchal register of dues of 1870, it was recorded that the village had 2 households, who paid 10 dues, and did not have a church or a priest. It is tentatively identified with the village of Talmassas, which was populated by 150 Syriacs in 1914, according to the list presented to the Paris Peace Conference by the Assyro-Chaldean delegation. It was located in the kaza (district) of Beşiri.

== Bibliography ==
- Bcheiry, Iskandar (2009). The Syriac Orthodox Patriarchal Register of Dues of 1870: An Unpublished Historical Document from the Late Ottoman Period. Gorgias Press.
- Gaunt, David (2006). Massacres, Resistance, Protectors: Muslim-Christian Relations in Eastern Anatolia during World War I. Gorgias Press.
- Jongerden, Joost; Verheij, Jelle, eds. (2012). Social Relations in Ottoman Diyarbekir, 1870-1915. Brill.
