= Ümitalan, Kestel =

Village in Turkey

Ümitalan
- Neighbourhood
- Location in Turkey Ümitalan (Marmara)
- Coordinates: 40°10′N 29°22′E
- Country: Turkey
- Province: Bursa
- District: Kestel
- Population (2022): 619
- Time zone: UTC+3 (TRT)

Ümitalan is a neighbourhood in the municipality and district of Kestel, Bursa Province in Turkey. Its population is 619 (2022).
