= Kayabağı, Batman =

Village in Batman Province, Turkey

Kayabağı
- Village
- Location within Turkey
- Coordinates: 37.931°N 41.211°E
- Country: Turkey
- Province: Batman
- District: Batman
- Population (2021): 375
- Time zone: UTC+3 (TRT)

Kayabağı (Kurdish: Basorkê; Syriac: Bāṣūrak) (Note: Alternatively transliterated as Basorik, Basoruk, Bassorig, Bassourké, or Pa-Hazrig.) is a village in the Batman District of Batman Province in Turkey. The village is populated by Kurds of the Reşkotan and Sinikan tribes and had a population of 375 in 2021.

The hamlets of Badaraş and Kırmataş are attached to the village.

== History ==
Bāṣūrak (today called Kayabağı) was historically inhabited by Syriac Orthodox Christians and Kurdish-speaking Armenians. In the Syriac Orthodox patriarchal register of dues of 1870, it was recorded that the village had three households, who paid twelve dues, and did not have a church or a priest. There were forty Armenian hearths in 1880. There was an Armenian church of Surb Poghos.

In 1914, there were 150 Syriacs at Bāṣūrak, according to the list presented to the Paris Peace Conference by the Assyro-Chaldean delegation. It was located in the kaza of Beşiri. The Armenians were killed by the Belek, Bekran, Şegro, and other Kurdish tribes in May 1915 amidst the Armenian genocide.

== Bibliography ==
- Bcheiry, Iskandar (2009). The Syriac Orthodox Patriarchal Register of Dues of 1870: An Unpublished Historical Document from the Late Ottoman Period. Gorgias Press.
- Gaunt, David (2006). Massacres, Resistance, Protectors: Muslim-Christian Relations in Eastern Anatolia during World War I. Gorgias Press.
- Jongerden, Joost; Verheij, Jelle, eds. (2012). Social Relations in Ottoman Diyarbekir, 1870-1915. Brill.
- Kévorkian, Raymond H. (2006). "Demographic Changes in the Armenian Population of Diarbekir, 1895-1914". In Richard G. Hovannisian (ed.). Armenian Tigranakert/Diarbekir and Edessa/Urfa. Mazda Publishers.
- Kévorkian, Raymond (2011). The Armenian Genocide: A Complete History. I.B. Tauris.
