= Kılıç, Batman =

Village in Batman Province, Turkey

Kılıç
- Village
- Location within Turkey
- Coordinates: 37.729°N 41.386°E
- Country: Turkey
- Province: Batman
- District: Batman
- Population (2021): 535
- Time zone: UTC+3 (TRT)

Kılıç (Kurdish: Zeriye) is a village in the Batman District of Batman Province in Turkey. The village is populated by Kurds of the Reman tribe and had a population of 535 in 2021.
