= Dudaklı, Kestel =

Village in Turkey

Dudaklı
- Neighbourhood
- Location in Turkey Dudaklı (Marmara)
- Coordinates: 40°14′N 29°19′E
- Country: Turkey
- Province: Bursa
- District: Kestel
- Population (2022): 366
- Time zone: UTC+3 (TRT)

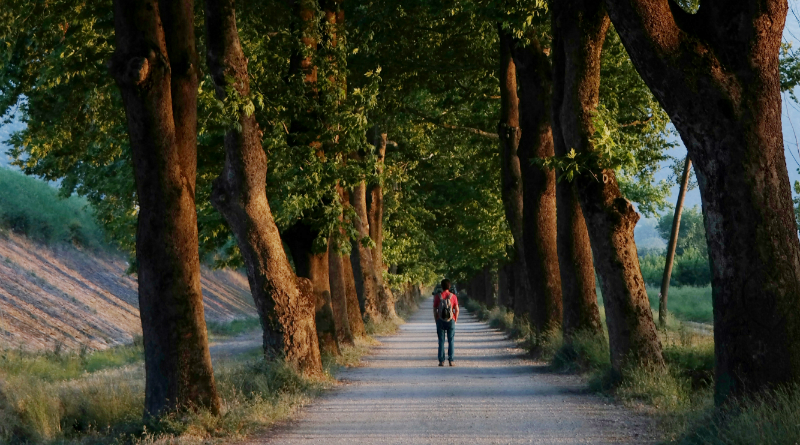

Dudaklı is a neighbourhood in the municipality and district of Kestel, Bursa Province in Turkey. Its population is 366 (2022).
