= Orhaniye, Kestel =

Village in Turkey

Orhaniye
- Neighbourhood
- Country: Turkey
- Province: Bursa
- District: Kestel
- Population (2022): 507
- Time zone: UTC+3 (TRT)

Orhaniye is a neighbourhood in the municipality and district of Kestel, Bursa Province in Turkey. According to the 2022 census, its population was 507.

== History ==
The village was founded by a few Georgian families who came after the Ottoman-Russian wars, known as the War of 93. Georgian has been spoken in the village since its establishment.

== Geography ==
It is 21 km from Bursa and 9 km from Kestel.
