= Gölbaşı, Kestel =

Village in Turkey

Gölbaşı
- Neighbourhood
- Location in Turkey Gölbaşı (Marmara)
- Coordinates: 40.226°N 29.351°E
- Country: Turkey
- Province: Bursa
- District: Kestel
- Population (2022): 44
- Time zone: UTC+3 (TRT)

Gölbaşı is a neighborhood in the municipality and district of Kestel, Bursa Province in Turkey. Its population is 44 (2022).
