= Çeşmebaşı, Batman =

Village in Batman Province, Turkey

Çeşmebaşı
- Village
- Location within Turkey
- Coordinates: 37.749°N 41.274°E
- Country: Turkey
- Province: Batman
- District: Batman
- Population (2021): 131
- Time zone: UTC+3 (TRT)

Çeşmebaşı (Kurdish: Serê Kanê) is a village in the Batman District of Batman Province in Turkey. The village is populated by Kurds of the Reman tribe and had a population of 131 in 2021.
