= Kesmeköprü, Batman =

Village in Batman Province, Turkey

Kesmeköprü
- Village
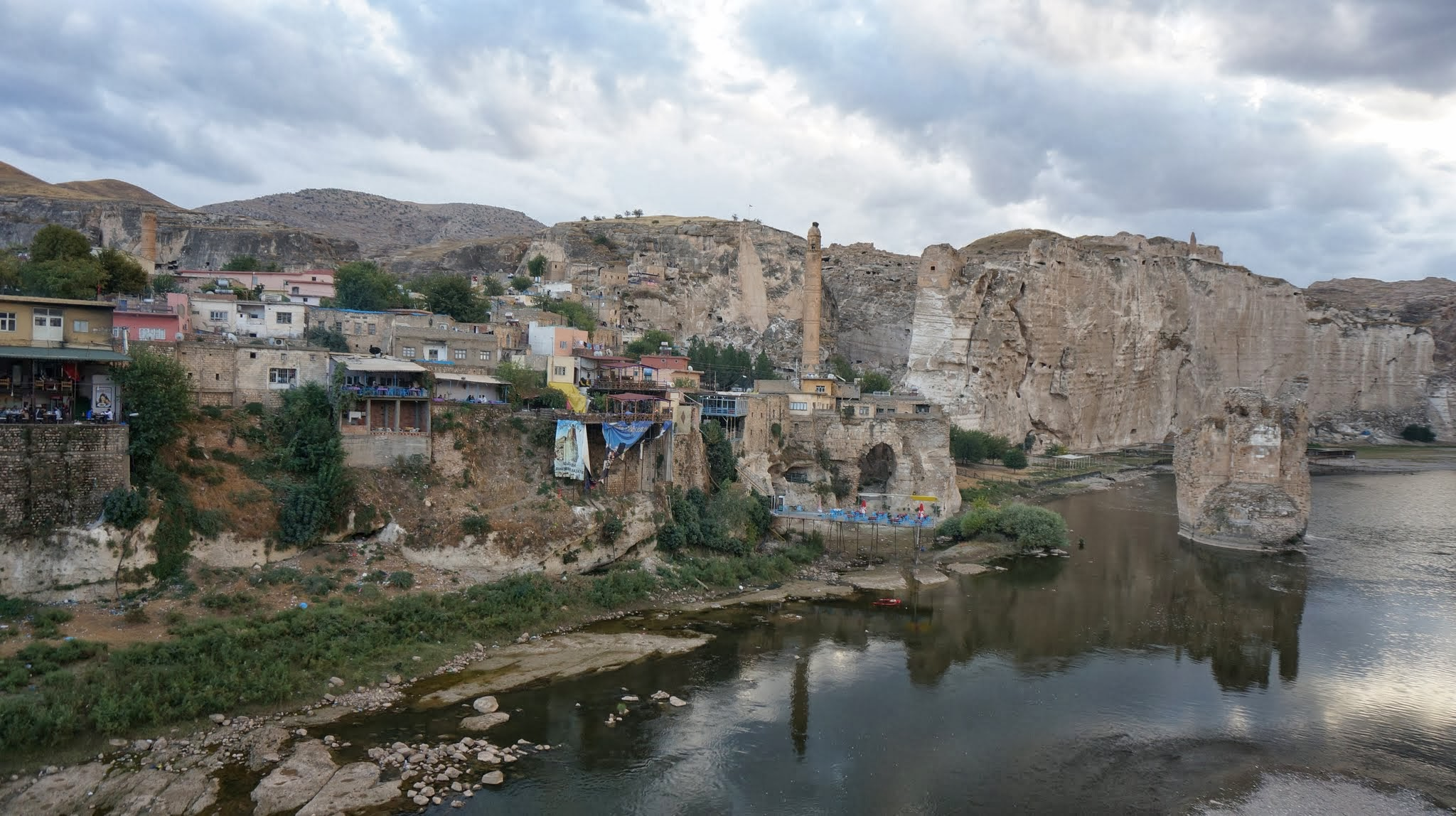

- Location within Turkey
- Coordinates: 37.737°N 41.451°E
- Country: Turkey
- Province: Batman
- District: Batman
- Population (2021): 147
- Time zone: UTC+3 (TRT)

Kesmeköprü (Kurdish: Qurê û Serpirê, Kuru Serpir Zêri) is a village in the Batman District of Batman Province in Turkey. The village is populated by Kurds of the Reman tribe and had a population of 147 in 2021.
