= Balpınar, Batman =

Town in Batman Province, Turkey

Balpınar
- Municipality
- Location in Turkey
- Coordinates: 37.868°N 41.055°E
- Country: Turkey
- Province: Batman
- District: Batman
- Population (2021): 5,685
- Time zone: UTC+3 (TRT)

Balpınar (Kurdish: Gîrêsira; Syriac: Grīsīrā) (Note: Alternatively transliterated as Giressira, Giresira, Giresiran, Girisiran, Kersivan, Kiresepra, Kre-Siran, or Kré-Siran.) is a town (belde) in the Batman District of Batman Province in Turkey. The town is populated by Kurds of the Reman tribe and had a population of 5,685 in 2021.

The town is divided into the neighbourhoods of Segirkan, Seyrantepe, Yeniköy and Yenimahalle.

== History ==
Grīsīrā (today called Balpınar) was historically inhabited by Syriac Orthodox Christians and Kurdish-speaking Armenians. In the Syriac Orthodox patriarchal register of dues of 1870, it was recorded that the village had one household, who paid eight dues, and did not have a church or a priest. There were seven Armenian hearths in 1880. There was an Armenian church of Surb Errordutiun. In 1914, the village was populated by 200 Syriacs, according to the list presented to the Paris Peace Conference by the Assyro-Chaldean delegation. It was located in the kaza of Beşiri. The Armenians were attacked by the Belek, Bekran, Şegro, and other Kurdish tribes in May 1915 amidst the Armenian genocide.

== Bibliography ==
- Bcheiry, Iskandar (2009). The Syriac Orthodox Patriarchal Register of Dues of 1870: An Unpublished Historical Document from the Late Ottoman Period. Gorgias Press.
- Gaunt, David (2006). Massacres, Resistance, Protectors: Muslim-Christian Relations in Eastern Anatolia during World War I. Gorgias Press.
- Jongerden, Joost; Verheij, Jelle, eds. (2012). Social Relations in Ottoman Diyarbekir, 1870-1915. Brill.
- Kévorkian, Raymond H. (2006). "Demographic Changes in the Armenian Population of Diarbekir, 1895-1914". In Richard G. Hovannisian (ed.). Armenian Tigranakert/Diarbekir and Edessa/Urfa. Mazda Publishers.
- Kévorkian, Raymond (2011). The Armenian Genocide: A Complete History. I.B. Tauris.
- Kevirbirî, Salih (2013). Filîtê Quto (in Turkish) (2nd ed.). Evrensel.
- Tan, Altan (2011). Turabidin'den Berriye'ye. Aşiretler - Dinler - Diller - Kültürler (in Turkish).
