= Turanköy, Kestel =

Village in Turkey

Turanköy
- Neighbourhood
- Country: Turkey
- Province: Bursa
- District: Kestel
- Population (2022): 385
- Time zone: UTC+3 (TRT)

Turanköy is a neighbourhood in the municipality and district of Kestel, Bursa Province in Turkey. Its population is 385 (2022). The village is populated largely by Bosniaks.
