= Seymen, Kestel =

Village in Turkey

Seymen
- Neighbourhood
- Location in Turkey Seymen (Marmara)
- Coordinates: 40°13′8″N 29°23′49″E
- Country: Turkey
- Province: Bursa
- District: Kestel
- Population (2022): 277
- Time zone: UTC+3 (TRT)

Seymen is a neighbourhood in the municipality and district of Kestel, Bursa Province in Turkey. Its population is 277 (2022).
