= Çarıklı, Batman =

Village in Batman Province, Turkey

Bıçakçı
- Village
- Location within Turkey
- Coordinates: 38.046°N 41.198°E
- Country: Turkey
- Province: Batman
- District: Batman
- Population (2021): 665
- Time zone: UTC+3 (TRT)

Bıçakçı (Kurdish: Reşik) is a village in the Batman District of Batman Province in Turkey. The village is populated by Kurds of the Reşkotan tribe and had a population of 665 in 2021.

The hamlet of Ödemiş is attached to the village.
