= Karayün, Batman =

Village in Batman Province, Turkey

Karayün
- Village
- Location within Turkey
- Coordinates: 37.834°N 41.113°E
- Country: Turkey
- Province: Batman
- District: Batman
- Population (2021): 1,025
- Time zone: UTC+3 (TRT)

Karayün (Kurdish: Koxikan) is a village in the Batman District of Batman Province in Turkey. The village is populated by Kurds of the Receban tribe and had a population of 1,025 in 2021.

The hamlet of Okçu is attached to the village and is also populated by the Receban tribe.
