= Batman Museum =

- Batman Müzesi
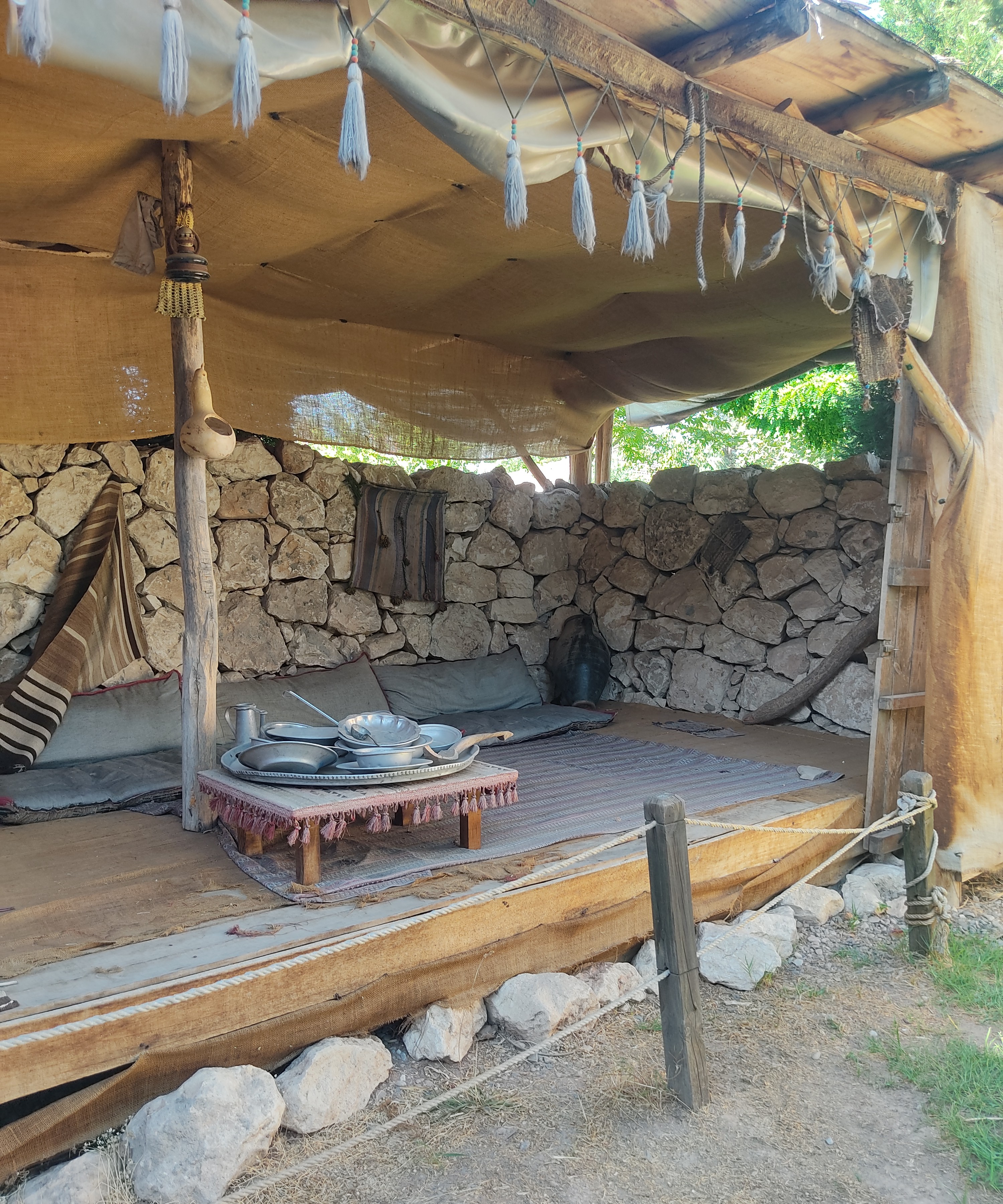

- Location within Turkey
- Established: March 12, 2010
- Location: Batman, Turkey
- Coordinates: 37.8986°N 41.1411°E
- Type: archeological museum open-air museum
- Key holdings: Başur Höyük gaming pieces
- Collection size: 450 items on display
- Website: https://www.muze.gov.tr/tr/muzeler/batman-muzesi

Batman Museum is an archaeological museum in the city of Batman in Southeastern Anatolia, Turkey. The museum opened on 12 March 2010 in a free-standing, two-floor building on the southern portion of the Batman Cultural Center site. The museum's collection of 450 items is organized into three exhibition halls, one covering the Paleolithic and Neolithic periods, a second with items from the Ilısu Dam excavations and a third with items from the city of Hasankeyf.

== Collections ==
The museum houses items uncovered during seven rescue excavations at sites in Batman and Siirt provinces that were due to be inundated by the Ilısu Dam.

=== Başur Höyük gaming pieces ===
Perhaps the museum's most important holding is the set of gaming pieces (Turkish: oyun taşları) discovered at Başur Höyük, in Siirt Province. The set was uncovered in a grave at Başur Höyük, one of nine in the southeast part of the 250-by-150-metre (820 by 490 ft) tell that were excavated during the 2011 and 2012 seasons. It has been carbon-dated to 3100-2900 B.C., placing their maker as a member of Early Bronze Age culture.

These 49 small carved painted stones are thought to be the oldest gaming pieces ever found. They are sculpted in various shapes including pigs, dogs, pyramids and circular and bullet shapes, and are painted in green, red, blue, black and white. The pieces were found with dice and three circular tokens made of white shell and topped with a black round stone. The tokens were accompanied by badly preserved wooden pieces or sticks, which the excavator hopes may provide clues to the game's rules.

The discovery was presented at a 2013 conference by excavator Haluk Sağlamtimur of Ege University in İzmir. He said that "the distribution, shape and number of the stone pieces... [suggests] ...that the game is based on the number four." Başur Höyük was inhabited as early as 7,000 B.C. and was on a trade route between Mesopotamia and East Anatolia. The site also yielded about 300 well-preserved amorphous bronze artefacts, and a great variety of painted and unpainted pottery, including some examples from the Ninivite 5 culture.

=== Other displays ===
Other important items in the museum's collections include bronze grave gifts from Başur Höyük; a figure of the god Bes from Hasankeyf; and a stele (Turkish: dikili taş) excavated from a 14,000-year-old site at Gusir Höyük, just west of Gusir Gölü, near the confluence of the Botan River with the Tigris southeast of Siirt.

The museum theater shows documentary films related to the objects on display in the museum. The museum also has a library with work on archeology, culture and art history and a restoration laboratory.

Outside, the "Museum Park" recreates historic buildings from the region with the aim of allowing visitors to experience the region's history more directly. These exhibits include recreations of the houses discovered at Güsir Höyük and at Gre Amer Höyük (on the east bank of the Garzan River, near Işıkveren village) as part of the Ilısu Dam rescue excavation; inhumation customs as observed at Kuriki Höyük (near Oymataş village, 14 kilometres (8.7 mi) south of Batman); the Başur Höyük gaming pieces; the Artuqid Gate from Hasankeyf; and a recreation of 20th-century village life in Hasankeyf. This garden area includes an educational area designed to familiarize school students with the processes of archeological excavation.

In early 2018, as the Turkish government prepared to fill the lake behind the Ilısu Dam, four of the reliefs from Hasankeyf's Old Bridge were moved to the Batman Museum's garden.

== Sources ==
- Doğan News Agency (14 February 2018). "Stones on submerging Hasankeyf bridge moved to museum".
- GAP Regional Development Administration, Batman Museum
- Lorenzi, Rossella (14 August 2013), Oldest Gaming Tokens Found in Turkey, Discovery News, archived from the original on 16 August 2013
- Ministry of Culture and Tourism, Batman Müzesi [Batman Museum] (in Turkish), archived from the original on 2018-07-06
