= Urganlı, Batman =

Village in Batman Province, Turkey

Urganlı
- Village
- Location within Turkey
- Coordinates: 37.732°N 41.361°E
- Country: Turkey
- Province: Batman
- District: Batman
- Population (2021): 251
- Time zone: UTC+3 (TRT)

Urganlı (Kurdish: Zaxoran) is a village in the Batman District of Batman Province in Turkey. The village is populated by Kurds of the Reman tribe and had a population of 251 in 2021.
