= Akoba, Batman =

Village in Batman Province, Turkey

Akoba
- Village
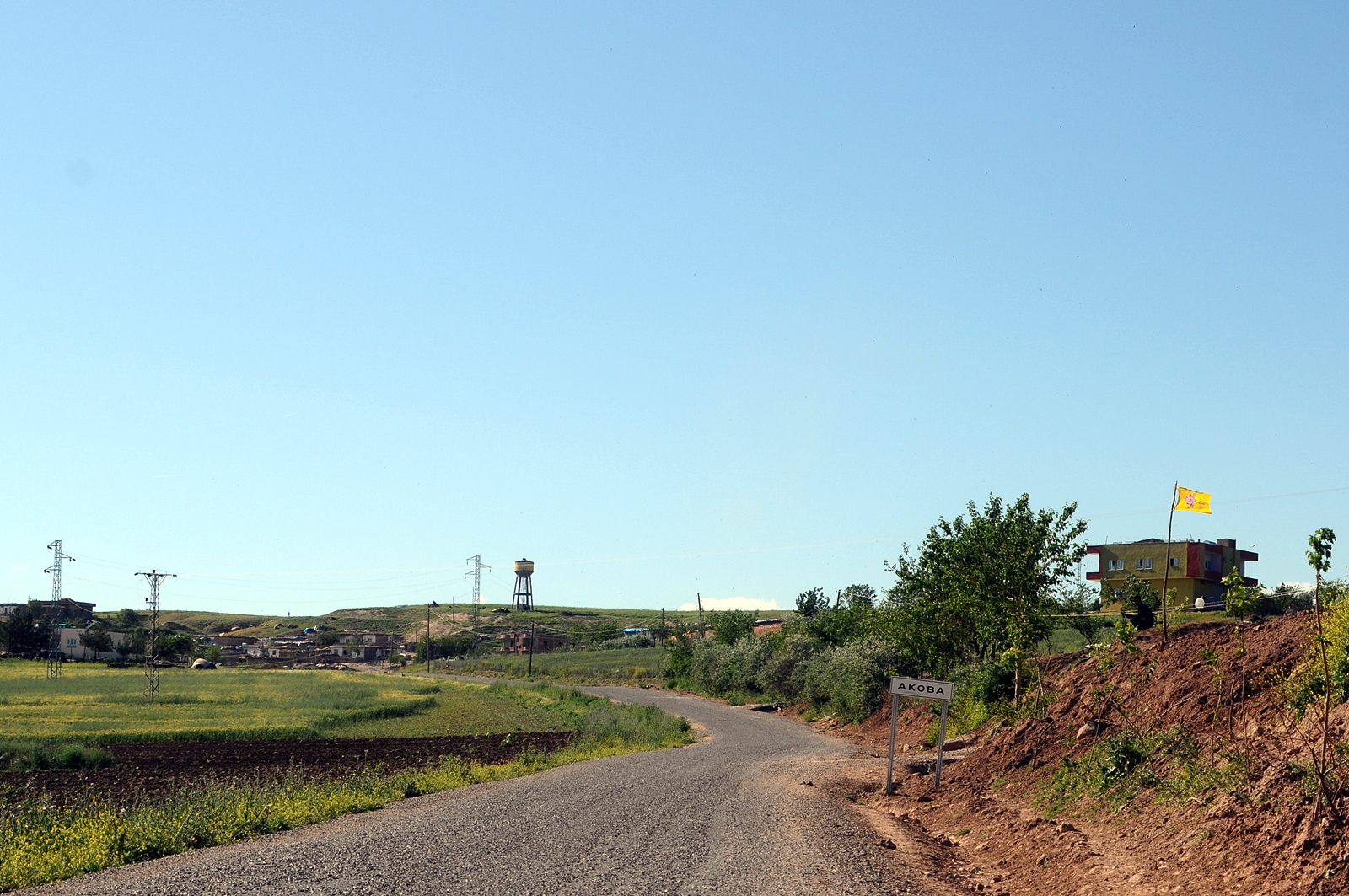

- Location within Turkey
- Coordinates: 37.943°N 41.055°E
- Country: Turkey
- Province: Batman
- District: Batman
- Population (2021): 738
- Time zone: UTC+3 (TRT)

Akoba (Kurdish: Akuban) is a village in the Batman District of Batman Province in Turkey. The village had a population of 738 in 2021.

The hamlet of Demirköy is attached to the village.
