= Gölcük, Kestel =

Village in Turkey

Gölcük
- Neighbourhood
- Location in Turkey Gölcük (Marmara)
- Coordinates: 40.276°N 29.378°E
- Country: Turkey
- Province: Bursa
- District: Kestel
- Population (2022): 476
- Time zone: UTC+3 (TRT)

Gölcük is a neighborhood in the municipality and district of Kestel, Bursa Province in Turkey. Its population is 476 (2022).
