= Saitabat, Kestel =

Village in Turkey

Saitabat
- Neighbourhood
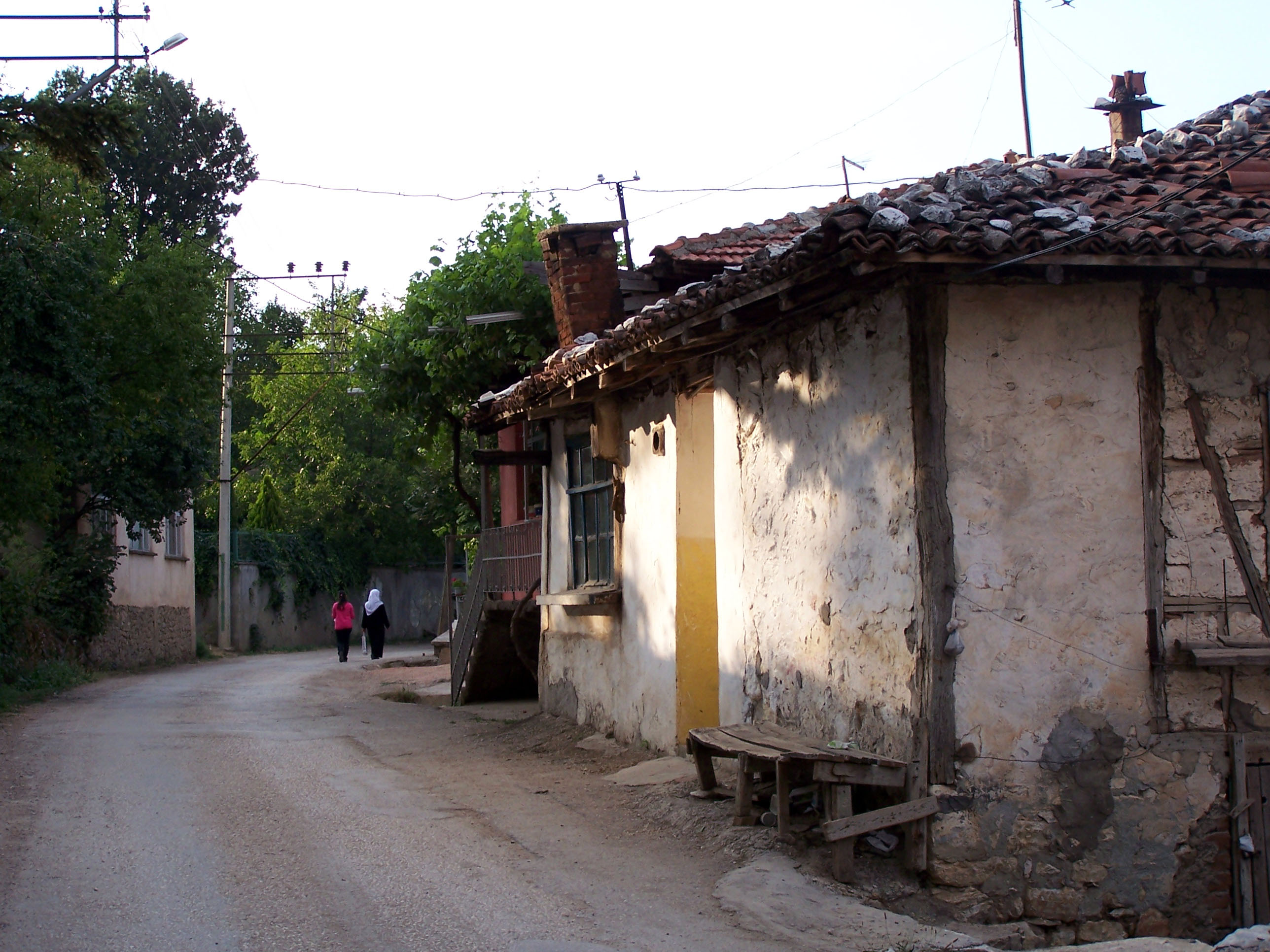

- Location within Turkey Location within Marmara
- Coordinates: 40°08′56″N 29°14′12″E
- Country: Turkey
- Province: Bursa
- District: Kestel
- Population (2022): 368
- Time zone: UTC+3 (TRT)

Saitabat is a neighbourhood in the municipality and district of Kestel, Bursa Province in Turkey. Its population is 368 (2022).
