= Yakıtlı, Batman =

Village in Batman Province, Turkey

Yaylıca
- Village
- Location within Turkey
- Coordinates: 37.769°N 41.297°E
- Country: Turkey
- Province: Batman
- District: Batman
- Population (2021): 52
- Time zone: UTC+3 (TRT)

Yaylıca (Kurdish: Zevê) is a village in the Batman District of Batman Province in Turkey. The village is populated by Kurds of the Elîkan tribe and had a population of 52 in 2021.

The hamlet of Dereüstü is attached to the village.
