= Doluca, Batman =

Village in Batman Province, Turkey

Doluca
- Village
- Location within Turkey
- Coordinates: 38.015°N 41.187°E
- Country: Turkey
- Province: Batman
- District: Batman
- Population (2021): 424
- Time zone: UTC+3 (TRT)

Doluca (Kurdish: Mêrîna) is a village in the Batman District of Batman Province in Turkey. The village is populated by Kurds of the Reşkotan tribes and had a population of 424 in 2021.

The hamlet of Esentepe is attached to the village.
