= Güneşli, Batman =

Village in Batman Province, Turkey

Güneşli
- Village
- Location within Turkey
- Coordinates: 38.049°N 41.240°E
- Country: Turkey
- Province: Batman
- District: Batman
- Population (2021): 375
- Time zone: UTC+3 (TRT)

Güneşli (Kurdish: Lîçikê) is a village in the Batman District of Batman Province in Turkey. The village is populated by Kurds of the Reşkotan tribe and had a population of 375 in 2021.

The hamlets of Belik, Neval, Reyhançeşmesi and Üçtepe are attached to the village.
