= Yolveren, Batman =

Village in Batman Province, Turkey

Yolveren
- Village
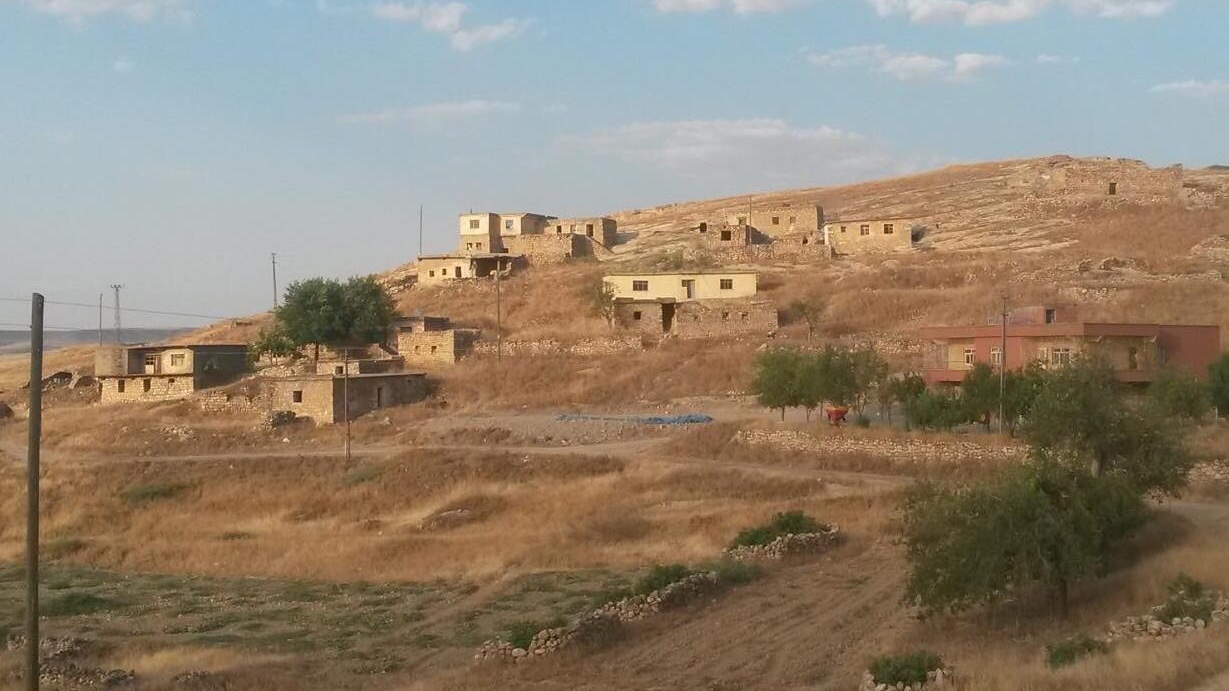

- Location within Turkey
- Coordinates: 37.800°N 41.277°E
- Country: Turkey
- Province: Batman
- District: Batman
- Population (2021): 58
- Time zone: UTC+3 (TRT)

Yolveren (Kurdish: Çînêran) is a village in the Batman District of Batman Province in Turkey. The village is populated by Kurds of the Reman tribe and had a population of 58 in 2021. The village is Yazidi.
