= Demirlipınar, Batman =

Village in Batman Province, Turkey

Demirlipınar
- Village
- Location within Turkey
- Coordinates: 37.961°N 41.175°E
- Country: Turkey
- Province: Batman
- District: Batman
- Population (2021): 744
- Time zone: UTC+3 (TRT)

Demirlipınar (Kurdish: Mozgelan) is a village in the Batman District of Batman Province in Turkey. The village is populated by Kurds of the Reşkotan tribe and had a population of 744 in 2021.

The hamlets of Çayeli and Yüksektepe are attached to the village.
