= Burhaniye, Kestel =

Village in Turkey

Burhaniye
- Neighbourhood
- Location in Turkey Burhaniye (Marmara)
- Coordinates: 40.1694°N 29.2405°E
- Country: Turkey
- Province: Bursa
- District: Kestel
- Population (2022): 250
- Time zone: UTC+3 (TRT)

Burhaniye is a neighbourhood in the municipality and district of Kestel, Bursa Province in Turkey. Its population is 250 (2022).
