= Ağlaşan, Kestel =

Village in Turkey

Ağlaşan
- Neighbourhood
- Location in Turkey Ağlaşan (Marmara)
- Coordinates: 40°17′N 29°17′E
- Country: Turkey
- Province: Bursa
- District: Kestel
- Population (2022): 106
- Time zone: UTC+3 (TRT)

Ağlaşan is a neighbourhood in the municipality and district of Kestel, Bursa Province in Turkey. Its population is 106 (2022).
