= Kocalar, Batman =

Village in Batman Province, Turkey

Kocalar
- Village
- Location within Turkey
- Coordinates: 37.965°N 41.121°E
- Country: Turkey
- Province: Batman
- District: Batman
- Population (2021): 1,014
- Time zone: UTC+3 (TRT)

Kocalar (Kurdish: Qoca; Syriac: Qūğā) (Note: Also known as Gocan, Kocan, Koçan, Kodjan, Zorkan, Gojan, and Zorkan Godjan.) is a village in the Batman District of Batman Province in Turkey. The village had a population of 1,014 in 2021.

== History ==
Qūğā (today called Kocalar) was historically inhabited by Syriac Orthodox Christians and Kurdish-speaking Armenians. In the Syriac Orthodox patriarchal register of dues of 1870, it was recorded that the village had 5 households, who paid 16 dues, and did not have a church or a priest. There were 50 Armenian hearths in 1880. There was an Armenian church of Surb Nshan.

It was populated by 50 Syriacs in 1914, according to the list presented to the Paris Peace Conference by the Assyro-Chaldean delegation. It was located in the kaza (district) of Beşiri. The Armenians were attacked by the Belek, Bekran, Şegro, and other Kurdish tribes in May 1915 amidst the Armenian genocide.

== Bibliography ==
- Bcheiry, Iskandar (2009). The Syriac Orthodox Patriarchal Register of Dues of 1870: An Unpublished Historical Document from the Late Ottoman Period. Gorgias Press.
- Gaunt, David (2006). Massacres, Resistance, Protectors: Muslim-Christian Relations in Eastern Anatolia during World War I. Gorgias Press.
- Jongerden, Joost; Verheij, Jelle, eds. (2012). Social Relations in Ottoman Diyarbekir, 1870-1915. Brill.
- Kévorkian, Raymond H. (2006). "Demographic Changes in the Armenian Population of Diarbekir, 1895-1914". In Richard G. Hovannisian (ed.). Armenian Tigranakert/Diarbekir and Edessa/Urfa. Mazda Publishers.
- Kévorkian, Raymond (2011). The Armenian Genocide: A Complete History. I.B. Tauris.
