= Bayraklı, Batman =

Village in Batman Province, Turkey

Bayraklı
- Village
- Location within Turkey
- Coordinates: 37.993°N 41.182°E
- Country: Turkey
- Province: Batman
- District: Batman
- Population (2021): 574
- Time zone: UTC+3 (TRT)

Bayraklı (Kurdish: Liçika Xaşik) is a village in the Batman District of Batman Province in Turkey. The village is populated by Kurds of the Reşkotan tribe and had a population of 574 in 2021.

The hamlets of Selamet and Yoğurtlu are attached to the village.
