= Alaçam, Kestel =

Village in Turkey

Alaçam
- Neighbourhood
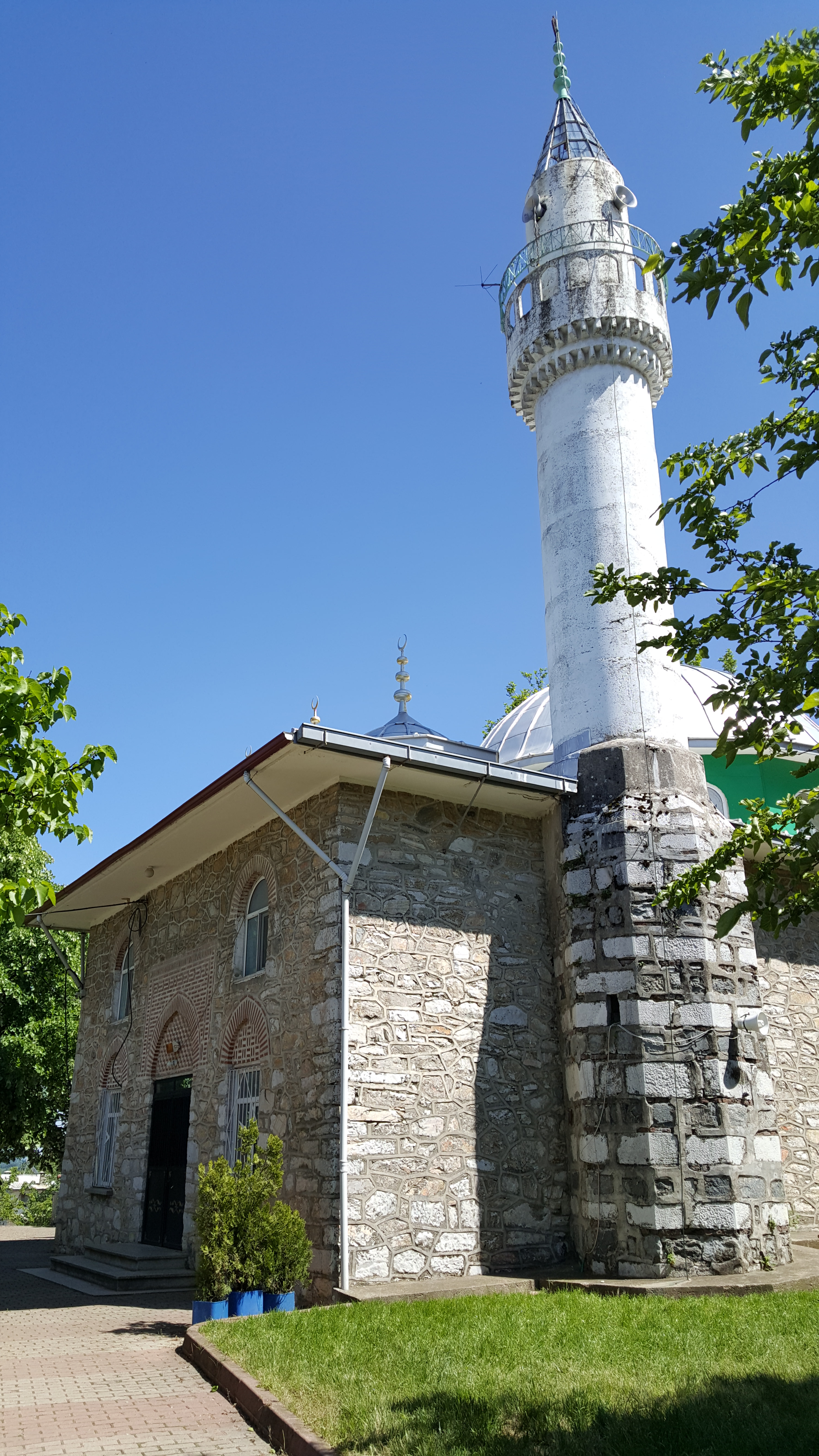

- Location within Turkey Location within Marmara
- Coordinates: 40.1257°N 29.2907°E
- Country: Turkey
- Province: Bursa
- District: Kestel
- Population (2022): 438
- Time zone: UTC+3 (TRT)

Alaçam is a neighbourhood in the municipality and district of Kestel, Bursa Province in Turkey. Its population is 438 (2022).
