= Lütfiye, Kestel =

Village in Turkey

Lütfiye
- Neighbourhood
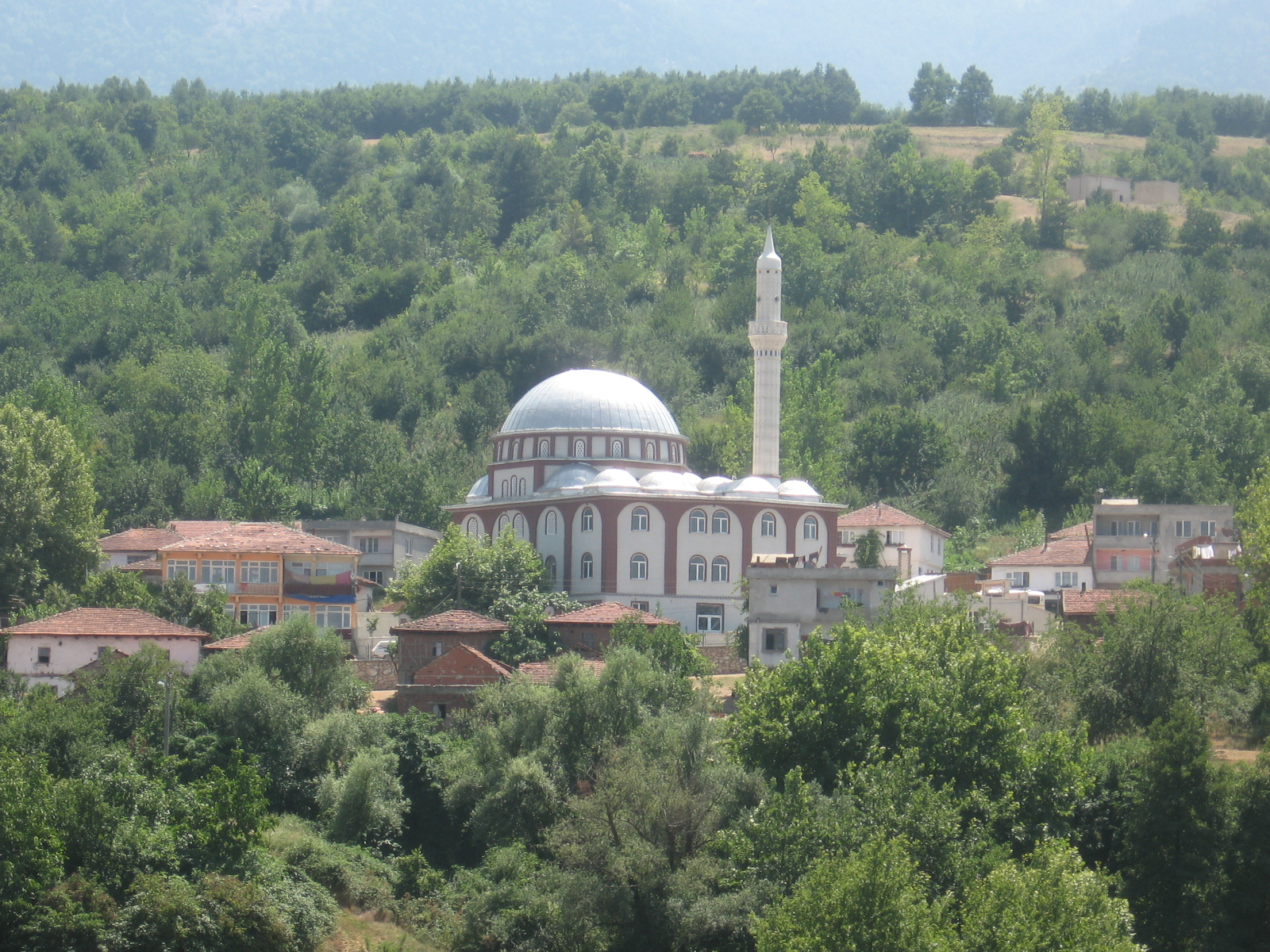

- Location within Turkey Location within Marmara
- Country: Turkey
- Province: Bursa
- District: Kestel
- Population (2022): 242
- Time zone: UTC+3 (TRT)

Lütfiye is a neighbourhood in the municipality and district of Kestel, Bursa Province in Turkey. Its population is 242 (2022).
