= Karapetê Xaço =

Karapetê Xaço or Karabêtê Xaço or Gerabêtê Xaço (Armenian: Կարապետ Խաչո) (September 3, 1900 or 1903 or 1908 - January 15, 2005), was an Armenian singer of traditional Kurdish Dengbêj music.

Karapetê Haço was born in the village of Bileyder (now called Binatlı, Batman, in Batman province, Turkey) in the Ottoman Empire to an Armenian family in 1900. In 1915, he witnessed the annihilation of his village during the Armenian genocide. Xaço, his brother Abraham, and sisters Manuşak and Xezal survived the massacre, as a soldier spared them due to them being orphaned. He was saved by his knowledge of Kurmanji and his singing talent. He joined the Kurdish rebels during the Sheikh Said Rebellion and had to flee to Syria in the French Mandate after the rebellion was defeated.

At a young age, he began taking a liking for music and would sing old Kurdish folk songs that were passed on through generations. He worked as a mercenary soldier in the French Armenian Legion for nearly 15 years. He married Yeva of the Azizyan family in the Syrian city of Qamishli, where he was a legionnaire in 1936. They had four daughters and a son. After Syria gained its independence, he and his family migrated to Armenian Soviet Socialist Republic and settled in Yerevan in 1946. He formulated his experiences of the genocide. Karapete Xaço worked for the Kurdish language service of Yerevan Radio and was popular among the Kurdish people.

Xaço later became one of the greatest singers of Dengbêj music, a form of singing that often tells a story. He died on January 15, 2005.

The hundreds of Kurdish dengbêj songs are considered to be one of the key elements in preserving Kurdish culture and history. Xaço was best known for singing and recording the traditional songs "Ay lo mîro", "Adullê", "Çume Cizîre", "Xim ximê", and "Lê dayikê". Since he recorded them, variations of these songs have been recorded by several different artists to this day.

== Documentary ==
- Mehmet Aktaş, Dengekî Zemanê Bere: Karapêtê Xaço: Voice from the Past (Belgium: Medya TV, 2000).
