= Yaylıca, Batman =

Village in Batman Province, Turkey

Yaylıca
- Village
- Location within Turkey
- Coordinates: 38.007°N 41.230°E
- Country: Turkey
- Province: Batman
- District: Batman
- Population (2021): 1,240
- Time zone: UTC+3 (TRT)

Yaylıca (Kurdish: Dirbêsan) is a village in the Batman District of Batman Province in Turkey. The village is populated by Kurds of the Reşkotan tribe and had a population of 1,240 in 2021.

The hamlets of Aziziye, Oluklu and Şerbet are attached to the village.
