= Aksu, Kestel =

Village in Turkey

Aksu
- Neighbourhood
- Location in Turkey Aksu (Marmara)
- Coordinates: 40.1661°N 29.3159°E
- Country: Turkey
- Province: Bursa
- District: Kestel
- Population (2022): 361
- Time zone: UTC+3 (TRT)

Aksu is a neighbourhood in the municipality and district of Kestel, Bursa Province in Turkey. Its population is 361 (2022).
