= Kuyubaşı, Batman =

Village in Batman Province, Turkey

Kuyubaşı
- Village
- Location within Turkey
- Coordinates: 37.841°N 41.082°E
- Country: Turkey
- Province: Batman
- District: Batman
- Population (2021): 1,417
- Time zone: UTC+3 (TRT)

Kuyubaşı (Kurdish: Cegeluye) is a village in the Batman District of Batman Province in Turkey. The village had a population of 1,417 in 2021.

The hamlet of Eyerci is attached to the village.
