= Kazancı, Kestel =

Village in Turkey

Kazancı
- Neighbourhood
- Location in Turkey Kazancı (Marmara)
- Coordinates: 40°9′7″N 29°20′56″E
- Country: Turkey
- Province: Bursa
- District: Kestel
- Population (2022): 173
- Time zone: UTC+3 (TRT)

Kazancı (formerly: Şükraniye) is a neighbourhood in the municipality and district of Kestel, Bursa Province in Turkey. Its population is 173 (2022).
