= Erdoğan, Kestel =

Village in Turkey

Erdoğan
- Neighbourhood
- Location in Turkey Erdoğan (Marmara)
- Coordinates: 40°12′22″N 29°21′50″E
- Country: Turkey
- Province: Bursa
- District: Kestel
- Population (2022): 497
- Time zone: UTC+3 (TRT)

Erdoğan is a neighbourhood in the municipality and district of Kestel, Bursa Province in Turkey. Its population is 497 (2022). During the early years of the Ottoman Empire, the Battle of Dinboz was fought around this village between Turkish forces under Osman I and various regional Byzantine governors.
