= Batman District =

District of Batman Province, Turkey

- District
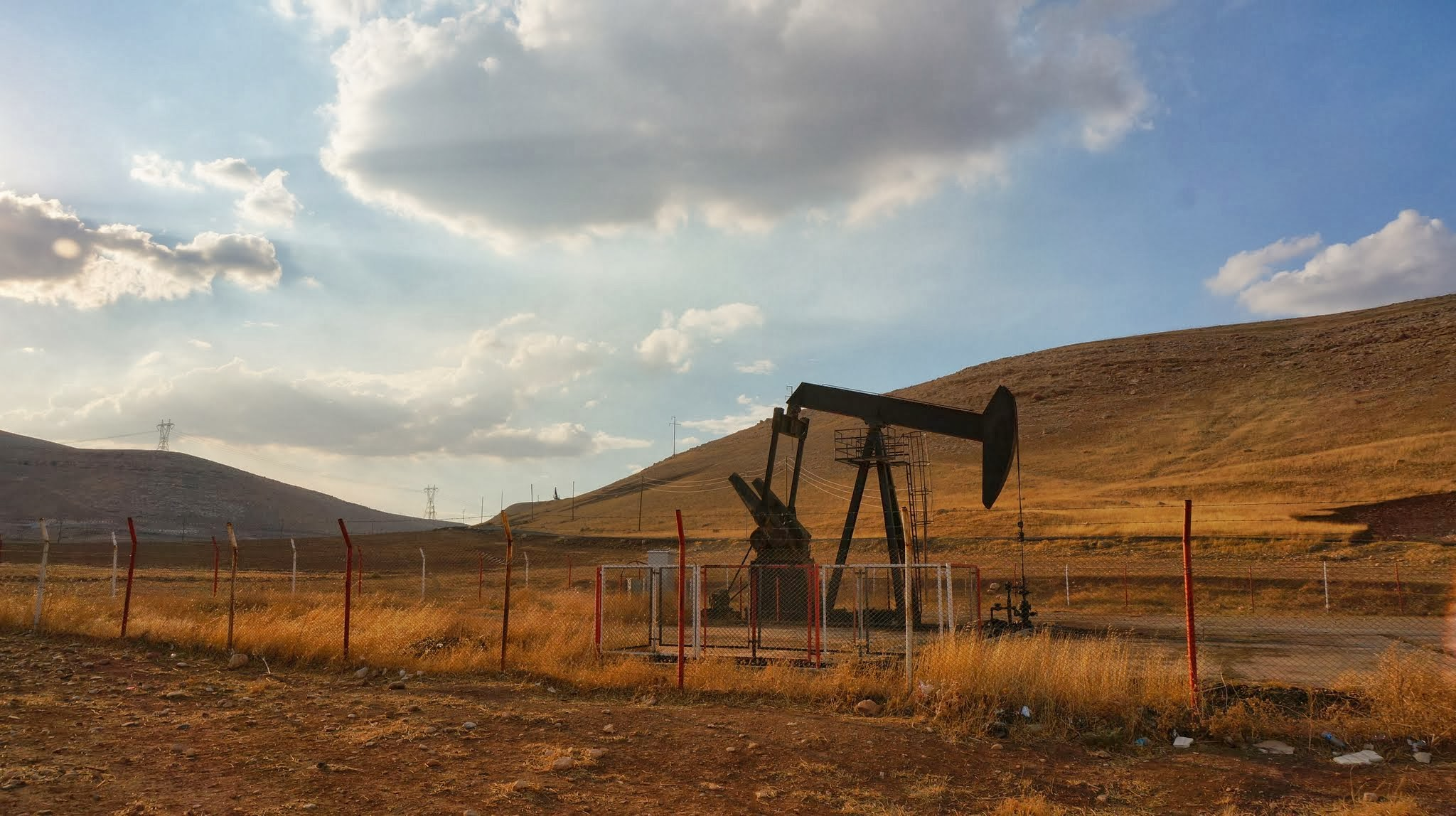
- near Binatlı, Batman

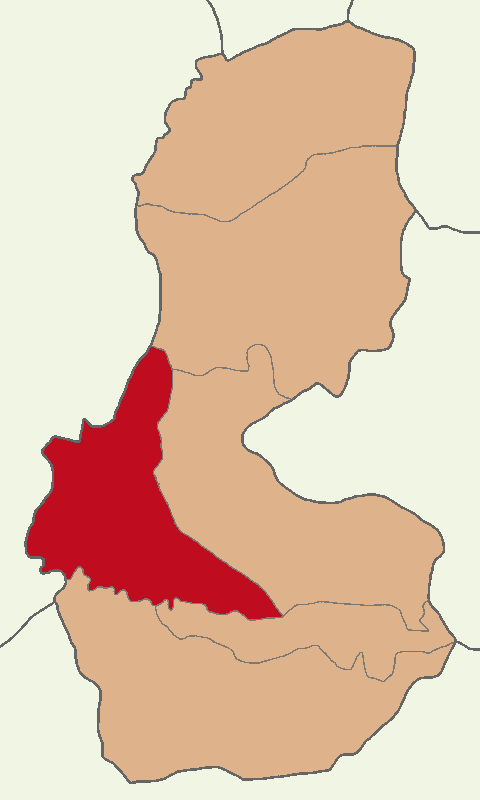
- Map showing Batman District in Batman Province

- Location within Turkey
- Coordinates: 37°53′N 41°8′E
- Country: Turkey
- Province: Batman
- Seat: Batman
- Area: 653 km^{2} (252 sq mi)
- Population (2021): 477,456
  - Density: 731/km^{2} (1,890/sq mi)
- Time zone: UTC+3 (TRT)

Batman District (also: Merkez, meaning "central") is a district of Batman Province in Turkey. Its seat is the city of Batman. Its area is 653 km^{2}, and the district had a population of 477,456 in 2021.

== Composition ==
There are two municipalities in Batman District:

- Balpınar
- Batman

There are 33 villages in Batman District:

1. Akça (Tilmiz)
2. Akoba (Akuban)
3. Bayraklı (Biçika Xaşik)
4. Bıçakçı (Kerikê)
5. Binatlı (Bilêyder)
6. Çarıklı (Reşik)
7. Çayüstü (Bêda)
8. Çeşmebaşı (Serê Kanê)
9. Çevrimova (Barisil)
10. Demirbilek (Meymuniye)
11. Demirlipınar (Mozgelan)
12. Diktepe (Xincika)
13. Doluca (Mêrîna)
14. Güneşli (Lîçikê)
15. Güvercin (Emso)
16. Karayün (Koxikan)
17. Kayabağı (Basorkê)
18. Kesmeköprü (Qurê û Serpirê)
19. Kılıç (Zeriye)
20. Kocalar (Qoca)
21. Kösetarla (Krediye)
22. Kuyubaşı (Cegeluye)
23. Oymataş (Bedîya)
24. Recepler (Receba)
25. Suçeken (Şikeftan)
26. Urganlı (Zaxoran)
27. Yağmurlu (Zêdya)
28. Yakıtlı (Zevê)
29. Yaylıca (Derbisan)
30. Yediyol (Tirzoqê)
31. Yeşilöz (Gundikê Qêre)
32. Yolağzı (Dawidiyê)
33. Yolveren (Çînêran)

The district encompasses 32 hamlets.
