= Narlıdere, Kestel =

Village in Turkey

Narlıdere
- Neighbourhood
- Country: Turkey
- Province: Bursa
- District: Kestel
- Population (2022): 509
- Time zone: UTC+3 (TRT)

Narlıdere is a neighbourhood in the municipality and district of Kestel, Bursa Province in Turkey. Its population is 509 (2022).
