= Recepler, Batman =

Village in Batman Province, Turkey

Recepler
- Village
- Location within Turkey
- Coordinates: 37.824°N 41.179°E
- Country: Turkey
- Province: Batman
- District: Batman
- Population (2021): 764
- Time zone: UTC+3 (TRT)

Recepler (Kurdish: Receba) is a village in the Batman District of Batman Province in Turkey. The village is populated by Kurds of the Receban tribe and had a population of 764 in 2021.
