= Gözede, Kestel =

Neighbourhood in Bursa, Turkey

Gözede
- Neighbourhood
- Location in Turkey Gözede (Marmara)
- Coordinates: 40°09′N 29°17′E
- Country: Turkey
- Province: Bursa
- District: Kestel
- Elevation: 619 m (2,031 ft)
- Population (2024): 409
- Time zone: UTC+3 (TRT)
- Postal code: 16450
- Area code: 0224

Gözede is a neighbourhood in the Kestel district of Bursa Province in Turkey. It is located on the northern slopes of Uludağ at an altitude of about 619 metres above sea level. Traditionally a Manav (native settled Turkmen) settlement, Gözede became notable in the Ottoman period through its production of charcoal. Today, its economy is largely based on agriculture and fruit cultivation.

== Etymology ==
There are several views regarding the origin of the name Gözede in both written sources and local oral tradition.

- Göze’de (at the spring): In Anatolian Turkish, the word göze denotes a spring or natural water source. With the addition of the locative suffix -de, the name has been interpreted as "at the spring". The settlement is also recorded in historical documents as Pınarlı (lit. "place with springs"), which supports this view.
- Göz Dede / Köz Dede: According to local folklore, the name derives from a figure known as "Göz Dede". However, the village’s documented association with charcoal production has led to the suggestion that the original form may have been Köz Dede ("Ember Elder"), symbolically linked to charcoal fires, which later underwent a phonetic shift to "Göz Dede" and eventually "Gözede".

Due to the abundance of water sources, the settlement appears in Ottoman registers and early 20th-century maps as "Gözede, also known as Pınarlı".

== History ==
Gözede is one of the older Manav settlements of the Bursa region and is generally considered to have been founded in the 14th century.

=== Ottoman period ===
According to the 1487 Hüdavendigar Tahrir Registers, the inhabitants of the village produced charcoal for the palace and the Ottoman army. Owing to this duty, the village was recorded with the status of "Sultan’s Coal Burners" (Sultanın Kömürcüleri), and its residents were granted certain tax exemptions in return for supplying charcoal.

==== Administrative structure and archival records ====
In the 16th century, the village was administratively connected to İnegöl, but by the early 19th century it had been transferred to the Bursa central district. An archival document dated 1805 refers to the settlement as "Gözede village of Bursa district" and contains records of a property case involving a resident named Ümmügülsüm Hatun.

==== Mining activities ====
At the beginning of the 20th century an arsenic deposit within the village boundaries was granted as a concession by imperial decree in 1909 to İsmail Paşazade İbrahim Derviş Bey and his partner. According to the concession terms, a share of the revenue was to be allocated to the Hejaz Railway. The concession was later annulled in 1913 by a decision of the Council of State (Şûrâ-yı Devlet) due to failure to meet operational obligations.

=== Republican era ===
Although originally a Manav settlement, the demographic structure of Gözede changed after the Russo-Turkish War (1877–1878), when Muslim refugees (muhacirs) from the Balkans were settled in the village. During the Turkish War of Independence, the settlement lay within the Greek occupation zone and suffered damage, after which it was rebuilt in the Republican period.

With the adoption of Law No. 6360 in 2012, the village’s legal entity was abolished and it became a neighbourhood of the Kestel district.

== Geography and climate ==
Gözede is situated in the Marmara Region, approximately 22 km from Bursa city centre and 10 km from Kestel town centre. It lies on rugged, forested terrain on the northern slopes of Uludağ, at an elevation of 619 metres. The surrounding vegetation consists mainly of chestnut, oak, hornbeam and cornelian cherry trees.

Although the area largely experiences the Marmara climate, winters are colder and snowier than in the district centre due to the higher altitude and mountainous setting.

== Economy ==
Historically, the local economy was based on forestry and charcoal production. Today it is predominantly agricultural.

- Fruit growing: Thanks to favourable climatic conditions, the neighbourhood is known for the cultivation of "Napoleon" sweet cherries (Prunus avium), as well as peach, walnut and the well-known Bursa chestnut.
- Other activities: Small-scale vegetable cultivation and household livestock breeding continue, along with seasonal forestry work under the supervision of the regional forestry authority.

== Cultural heritage ==
A historic Turkish bath (hamam) dating from the Ottoman period is located in the neighbourhood. Owned by the Gözede Village Development Cooperative, the bath was registered in 2018 by the Bursa Regional Board for the Preservation of Cultural Heritage as an "Immovable Cultural Property Requiring Protection" and classified as a second-group historical structure.

The structure reflects classical Ottoman bath architecture, consisting of a dressing hall, warm room, hot room and furnace section. The wooden ceiling of the dressing area is architecturally notable. However, the building is currently in a deteriorated condition and requires restoration.

== Population ==
Population of Gözede by year
2023	407
2018	411
2013	476

== Gallery ==
Media related to Gözede, Kestel at Wikimedia Commons

Views from Gözede

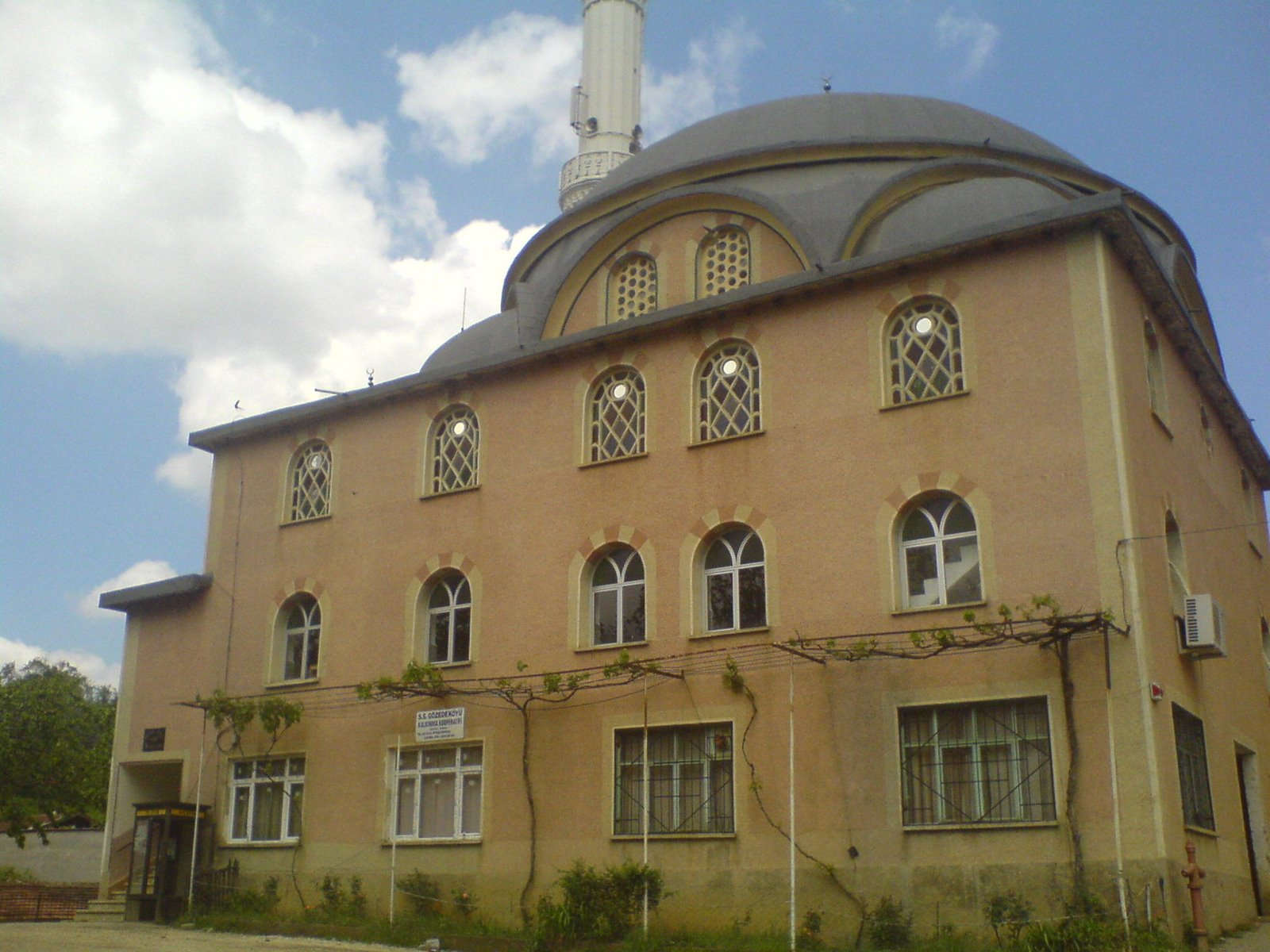
Village mosque (2008)

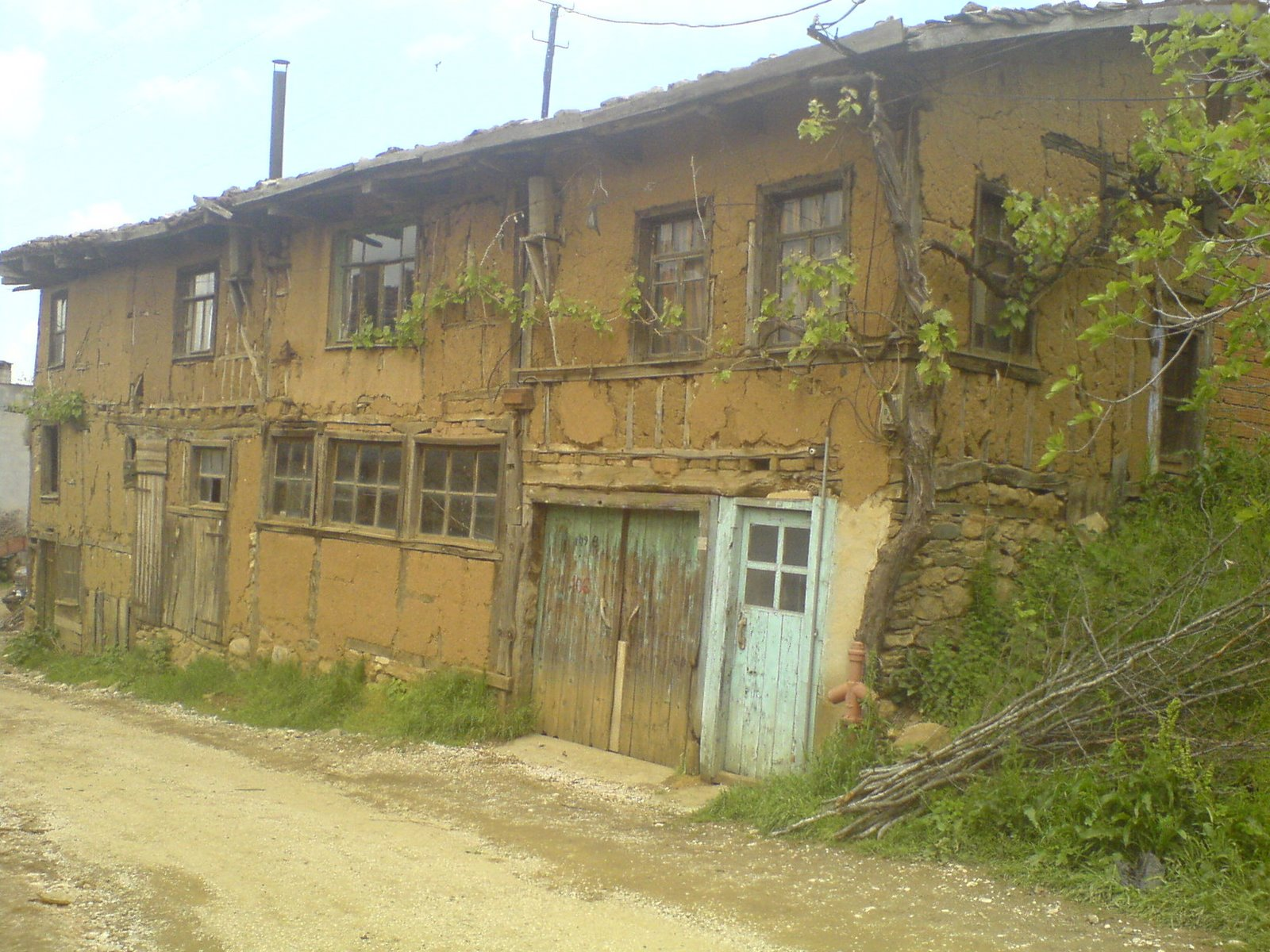
Traditional village house

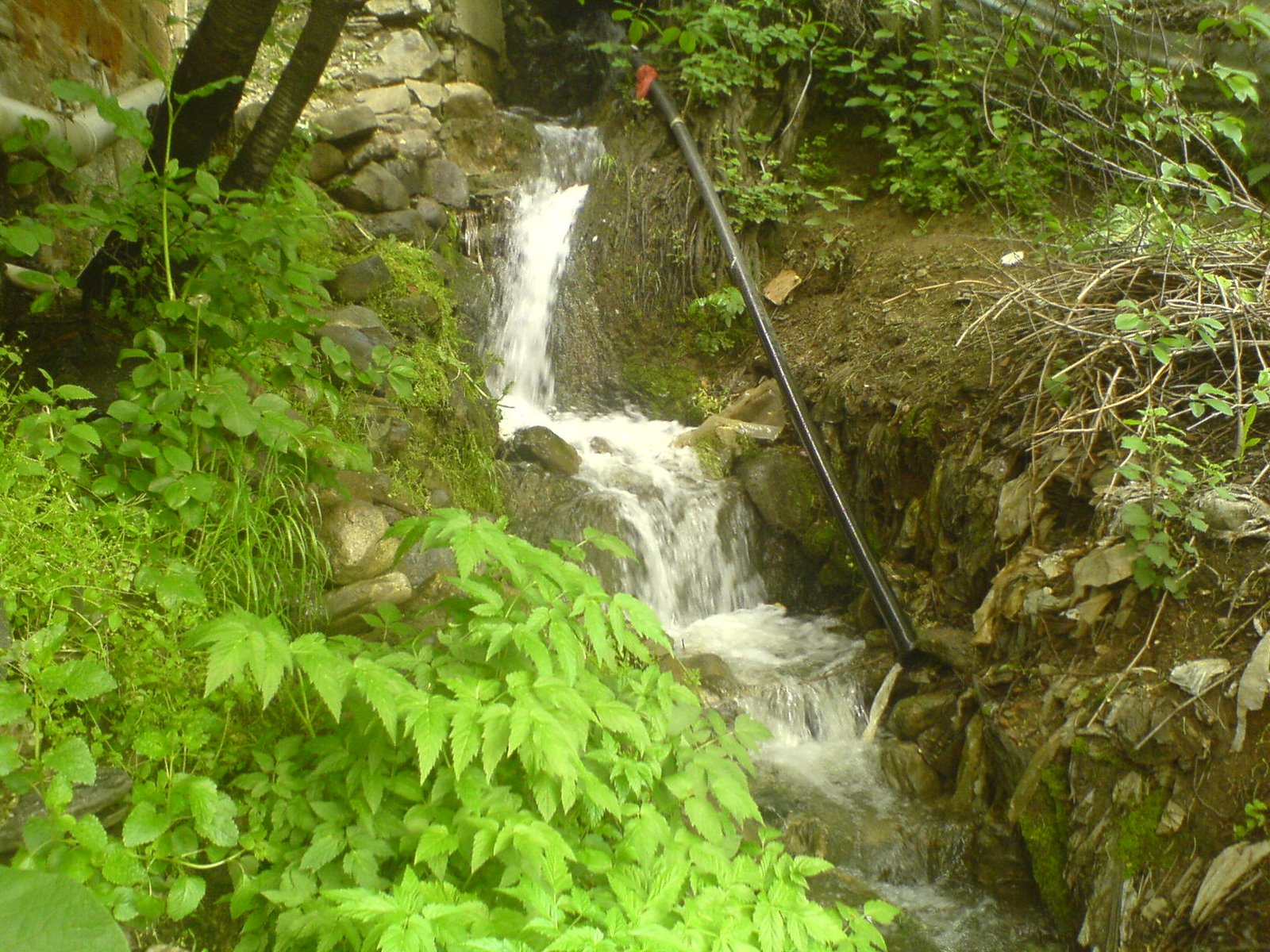
One of the springs associated with the alternative name “Pınarlı”

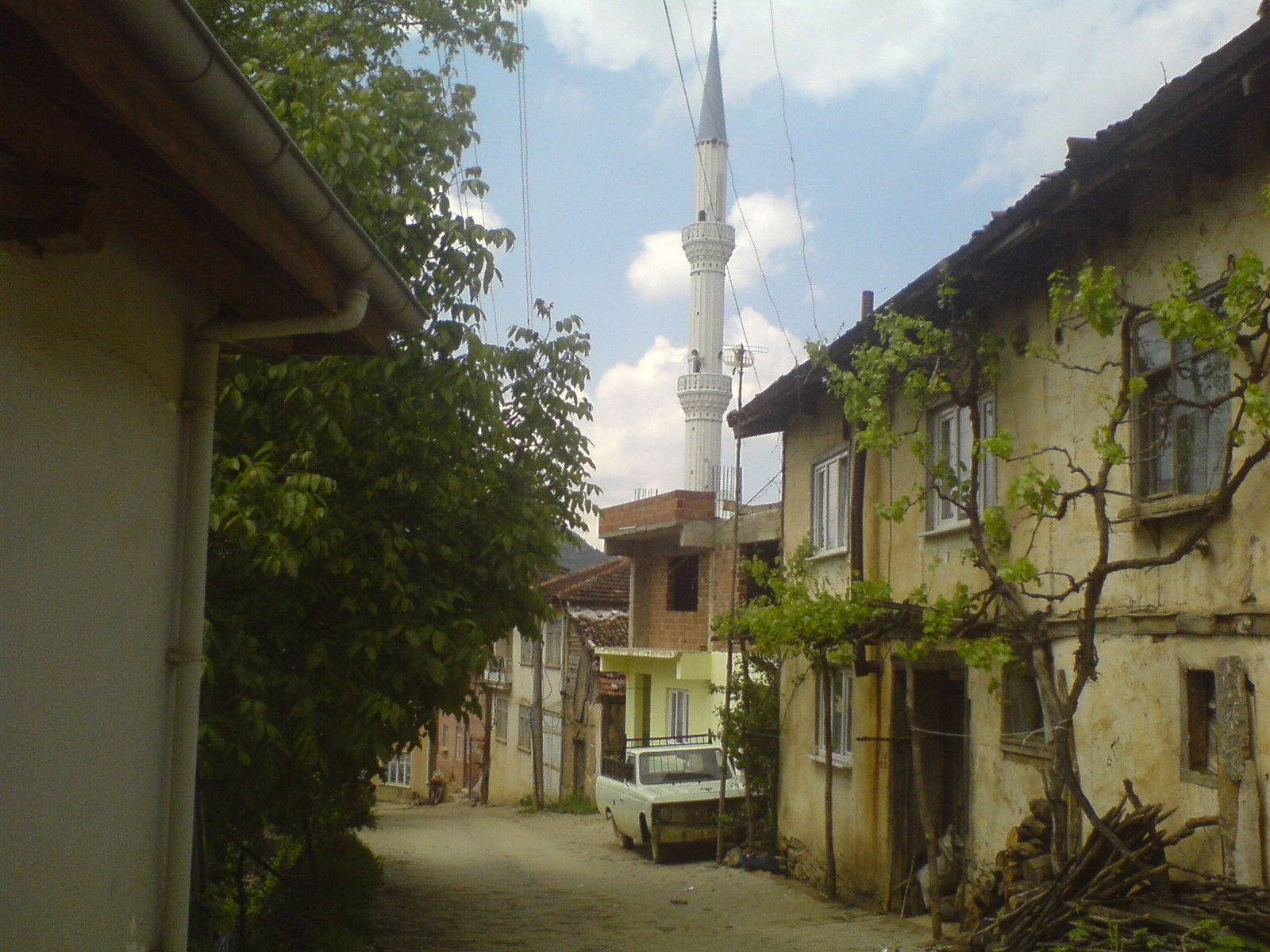
Village street and minaret silhouette

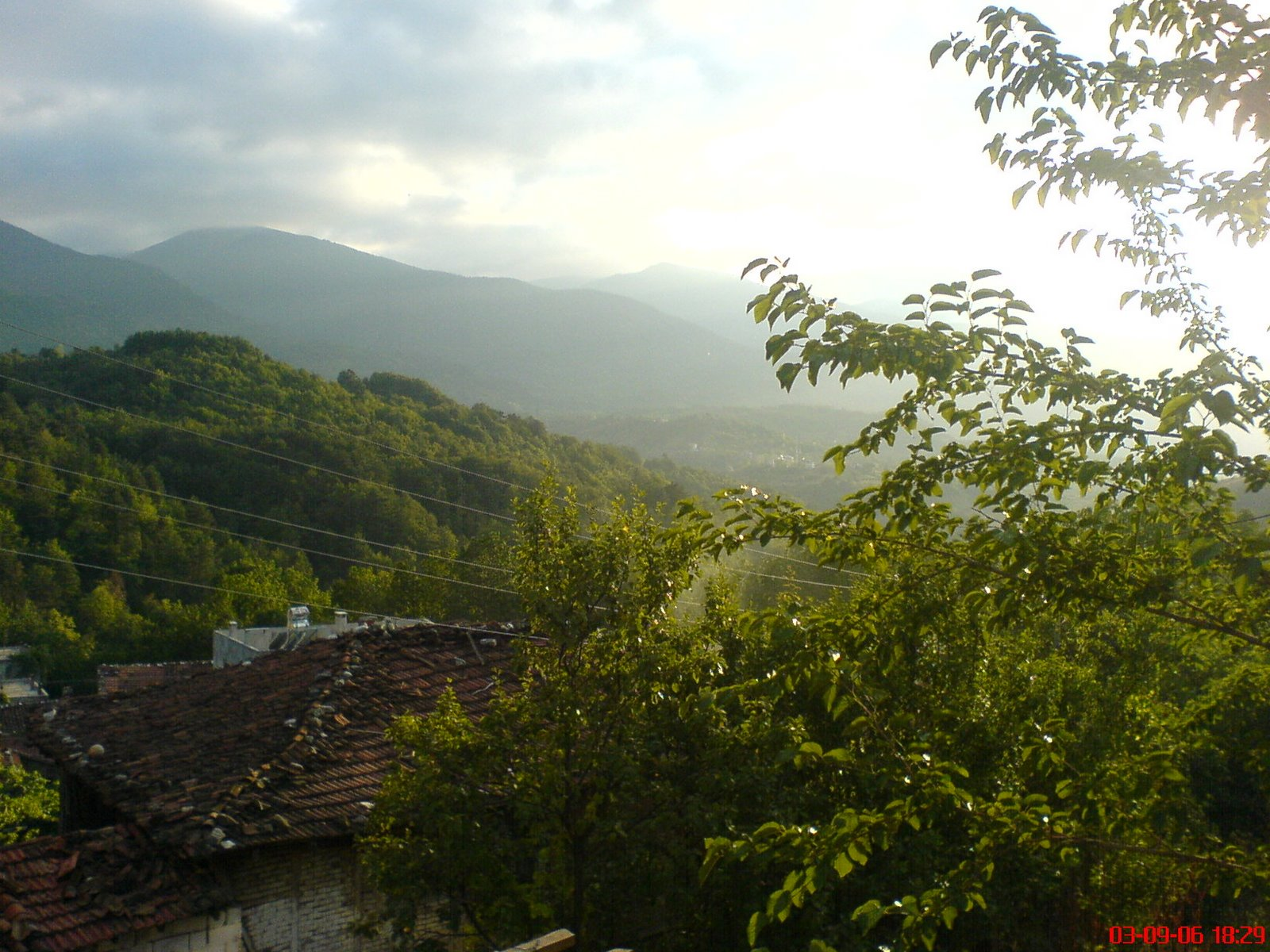
View of Uludağ from the village

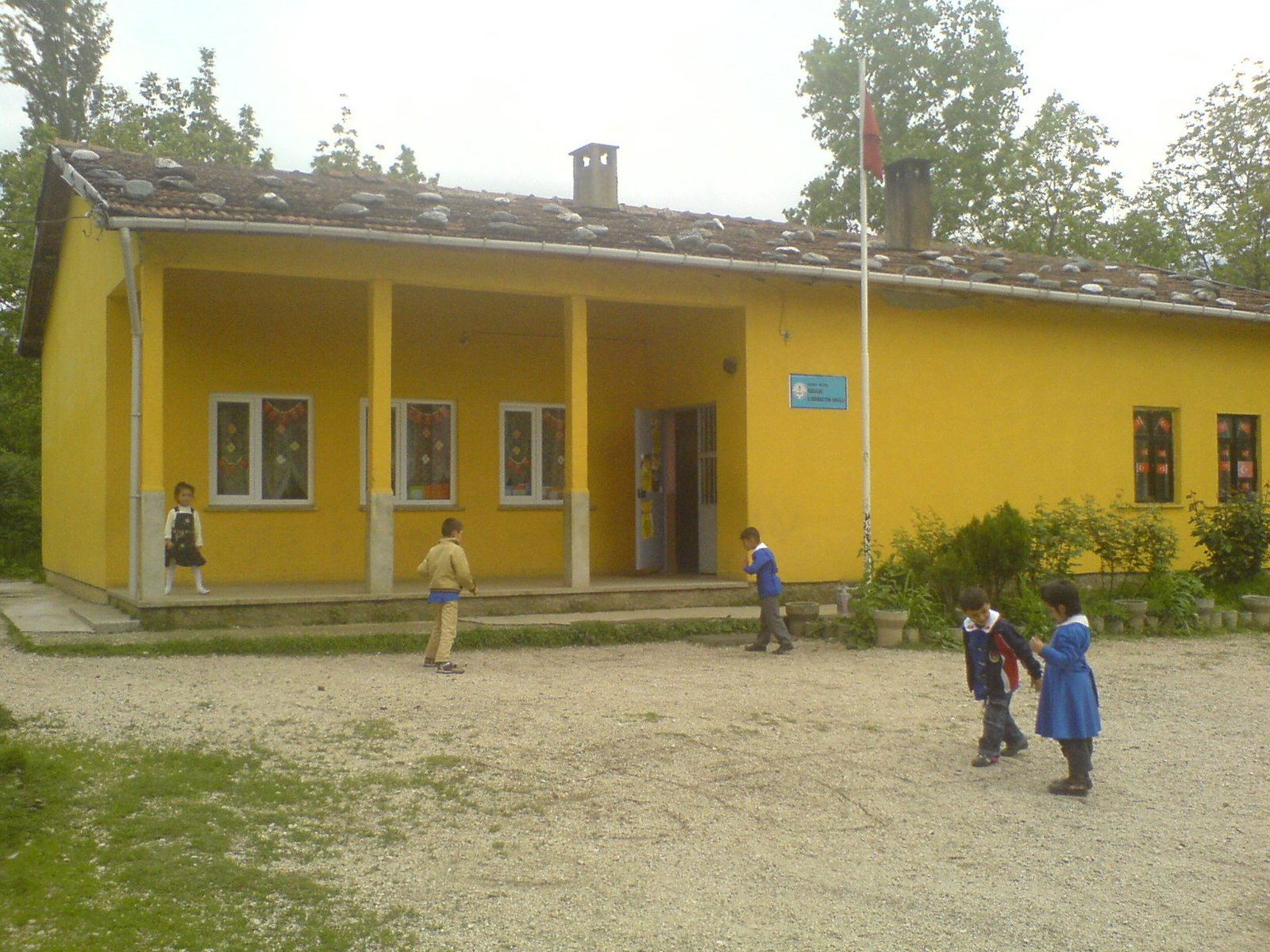
Former Gözede Primary School building
