= Çayüstü, Batman =

Village in Batman Province, Turkey

Çayüstü
- Village
- Location within Turkey
- Coordinates: 37.779°N 41.171°E
- Country: Turkey
- Province: Batman
- District: Batman
- Population (2021): 230
- Time zone: UTC+3 (TRT)

Çayüstü (Kurdish: Bêda) is a village in the Batman District of Batman Province in Turkey. The village is populated by Kurds of the Receban tribe and had a population of 230 in 2021.

The hamlets of Hacı Ömer and Salkımlı are attached to the village.
