= Kestel, Bursa =

Kestel
- District and municipality
- Logo

- Map showing Kestel District in Bursa Province

- Location in Turkey Kestel (Marmara)
- Coordinates: 40°11′37″N 29°12′42″E
- Country: Turkey
- Province: Bursa

Government
  - Mayor: Ferhat Erol (AKP)
- Area: 396 km^{2} (153 sq mi)
- Population (2022): 74,109
  - Density: 187/km^{2} (485/sq mi)
- Time zone: UTC+3 (TRT)
- Postal code: 16450
- Area code: 0224
- Website: www.kestel.bel.tr

Kestel is a municipality and district of Bursa Province, Turkey. Its area is 396 km^{2}, and its population is 74,109 (2022). It is located 14 km east of Bursa city center on the road to İnegöl.

== Composition ==
There are 35 neighbourhoods in Kestel District:

- Ağlaşan
- Ahmet Vefik Paşa
- Aksu
- Alaçam
- Babasultan
- Barakfakih
- Burhaniye
- Çataltepe
- Derekızık
- Dudaklı
- Erdoğan
- Esentepe
- Gölbaşı
- Gölcük
- Gözede
- Kale
- Kayacık
- Kazancı
- Kozluören
- Lütfiye
- Narlıdere
- Nüzhetiye
- Orhaniye
- Osmaniye
- Saitabat
- Sayfiye
- Serme
- Şevketiye
- Seymen
- Soğuksu
- Turanköy
- Ümitalan
- Vanimehmet
- Yağmurlu
- Yeni
