= Yağmurlu, Batman =

Village in Batman Province, Turkey

Yağmurlu
- Village
- Location within Turkey
- Coordinates: 38.074°N 41.224°E
- Country: Turkey
- Province: Batman
- District: Batman
- Population (2021): 276
- Time zone: UTC+3 (TRT)

Yağmurlu (Kurdish: Narikiyê) is a village in the Batman District of Batman Province in Turkey. The village is populated by Kurds of the Reşkotan tribe and had a population of 276 in 2021.

The hamlet of Uğrak (Zêdya) is attached to the village.
