= Oymataş, Batman =

Village in Batman Province, Turkey

Oymataş
- Village
- Location within Turkey
- Coordinates: 37.799°N 41.018°E
- Country: Turkey
- Province: Batman
- District: Batman
- Population (2021): 1,322
- Time zone: UTC+3 (TRT)

Oymataş (Kurdish: Bedîya) is a village in the Batman District of Batman Province in Turkey. The village is populated by Kurds of the Receban tribe and had a population of 1,322 in 2021.

The hamlets of Sincalı, Soğuksu, Şeyhçoban and Ünlüce are attached to the village.
