= Nûbihar =

Nûbihar also known as Kent Işıkları (Kurdish: Weşanxane Nûbihar, Turkish: Nubihar Yayınları) is an academic publisher founded in March 1992 in Istanbul, Turkey. The publishing house specialises on topics pertaining to Kurds.

The publication is named after a work of Ehmedê Xanî.

== History ==
Nûbihar was founded as a Nursi-influenced publication house just after the ban on the Kurdish was lifted. Even though it was legal to publish in Kurdish, its work remained a high-risk activity as local officials were ready to stifle Kurdish cultural activities by any chance. Nonetheless, Nûbihar survived any closure arguably because its publications were of religious and cultural nature and not political. During this period, the publication was accused of being Kurdist by the Gülen movement after the former had criticised the censorship of words like "Kurds" and "Kurdistan" in their publications of the works of Said Nursî.
