= Beşiri =

- Municipality
- Location in Turkey
- Coordinates: 37.921°N 41.292°E
- Country: Turkey
- Province: Batman
- District: Beşiri

Government
  - Mayor: Sait Karabulut (AKP)
- Population (2021): 11,120
- Time zone: UTC+3 (TRT)
- Website: www.besiri.bel.tr

Beşiri (Kurdish: Qubînê, Armenian: Բշերիկ, romanized: Bsherik, Chernik) is a town and seat of the Beşiri District in the Batman Province of Turkey. Its population is 11,120 (2021). It was originally a village of Diyarbakır Province, it later became a district of Siirt Province and finally in 1990 a district of Batman. The mayor is Sait Karabulut (AKP), elected in 2019.

The town is divided into the neighborhoods of Bağdu, Behrem, Cumhuriyet, (Texeriyê), Kobin, Mehmet Yatkın and Milli Egemenlik.

== Demographics ==
The Armenian Patriarchate of Constantinople recorded 5,038 Armenians in the kaza before the First World War. They spoke Kurdish and had 15 churches and 14 schools. 200 Assyrians lived in the town and 4,690 more in 27 surrounding villages. The vast majority of the Armenians and Assyrians were massacred during the Assyrian and Armenian genocides.

== Notable residents ==
- İsmail Özden
