= Duru (surname) =

- Language: Igbo: Turkish

Origin
- Origin: Nigeria: Turkey
- Meaning: Title of respect for nobles (Igbo): Lucid (Turkish)
- Region of origin: Southeast Nigeria: Turkey

Duru // is both an Igbo and Turkish surname. In Igboland, specifically Imo state, it is very common, being a traditional prefix for the master of a homestead; while in Turkish it means "lucid". These two meanings are unrelated.

== Notable people ==
- Alfred Duru (1829–1889), French playwright and operetta librettist
- Ali Ersan Duru (born 1984), Turkish actor
- Djustice Sears-Duru (born 1994), Canadian rugby union player
- Ebube Duru (born 1999), Nigerian football player
- Francis Duru (born 1969), Nigerian actor
- İsmail Hakkı Duru (born 1946), Turkish theoretical physicist
- Joan Duru (born 1989), French surfer
- Leo Duru (born 2005), American soccer player
- Nükhet Duru (born 1954), Turkish singer
- Sandra Duru-Eluobi (born 1982), Nigerian businesswoman
- Welcome Duru (1933–2009), South African actor, boxing promoter, composer, musician and politician

== See also ==
- Duru (disambiguation)
- Duru Shah, Indian gynaecologist and academic
- Duru–Kleinert transformation, named after İsmail Hakkı Duru and Hagen Kleinert
