= Duru (disambiguation) =

Duru is a ward and village in Tanzania. Duru may also refer to

== Places ==
- Ad-Duruʽ, a village in eastern Hadhramaut, Yemen
- Duru, Silvan, neighborhood in Silvan, Diyarbakır Province, Turkey

== People ==
- Duru (surname)
- Duru Shah, Indian gynaecologist and academic
- Duru (tribe), a Bedouin tribe of the United Arab Emirates (UAE)

== Other ==
- Duru languages spoken in northern Cameroon and eastern Nigeria
- Duru–Kleinert transformation in Quantum mechanics

== See also ==
- Dii languages, a Duru language dialect
- Durus kura, a chicken dish in Chittagonian and Rohingya cuisine
- Cophoscincopus durus, species of lizard in the family Scincidae
- Peristoreus durus, species of beetle
- Sporobolus durus, extinct species of grass in the family Poaceae
