= Path integral =

Path integral may refer to:

- Line integral, the integral of a function along a curve
- Contour integral, the integral of a complex function along a curve used in complex analysis
- Functional integration, the integral of a functional over a space of curves
- Path integral formulation, Richard Feynman's formulation of quantum mechanics using functional integration
