= Gynaecworld Clinic =

Gynaecworld is a women's health centre. It is located in Mumbai, India and is one of several Mumbai IVF clinics that also provides surrogacy.

The official Gynaecworld logo

The Gynaecworld clinic is founded and led by MD Dr Duru Shah

Here are some of the services available at Gynaecworld

- Obstetrics and Gynaecology consultation
- Fertility Services
- Premarital counselling
- Pre-pregnancy Counselling
- Pregnancy Care
- Antenatal exercise program
- Family Planning Services
- Endoscopy (Laparoscopy and Hysteroscopy)
- Teencare
- Dermatologist
- Dietician
- Ultrasound
- Laboratory services

== See also ==
- Akanksha Infertility Clinic, Anand, Gujarat
- Commercial surrogacy in India
