= Hagen Kleinert =

German theoretical physicist (1941–2025)

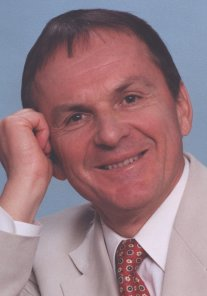
- Photo taken in 2006
- Born: 15 June 1941; Festenberg, Germany (now Twardogóra, Poland)
- Died: 7 March 2025 (aged 83); Berlin, Germany
- Education: Technical University of Hanover; Georgia Institute of Technology; University of Colorado Boulder
- Known for: Path integrals in polymer science World crystal Variational perturbation theory Duru–Kleinert transformation
- Scientific career
- Fields: Theoretical physics
- Workplaces: Free University of Berlin

Hagen Kleinert (15 June 1941 – 7 March 2025) was a professor of theoretical physics at the Free University of Berlin, Germany.

== Biography ==
Kleinert was born in Festenberg on 15 June 1941. Raised in Hanover, he graduated high school in 1960 and obtained his Vordiplom with distinction from the Technical University of Hanover in 1962.

In 1963, Kleinert moved to the United States, earning a Master of Science degree from the Georgia Institute of Technology in 1964. After studying at several intermediate institutions, he obtained his PhD from the University of Colorado Boulder in 1967 under the supervision of Asim Barut.

He then returned to Germany and joined Freie Universität Berlin, where he finished his habilitation and became an associate professor in 1969. Promoted to full professor in 1976, he worked there until retiring in 2009. He died on 7 March 2025.

== Research ==
Kleinert collaborated with Richard Feynman in some of Feynman's final work, developing a method to approximate quantum-mechanical partition functions using classical distribution functions. This led to variational perturbation theory, which enables a calculation of critical exponents near second-order phase transitions. The result was later confirmed for the lambda point of helium in experiments conducted at zero gravity.

Together with İsmail Duru, Kleinert developed the Duru–Kleinert transformation, an alternative to Feynman's time-sliced path integral construction, which can be used to solve the path integral formulations of the hydrogen atom and the centrifugal barrier.

Kleinert published over 400 articles, half of which were single-author papers. The topics include mathematical physics and the physics of elementary particles, nuclei, solid state systems, liquid crystals, biomembranes, microemulsions, polymers, and the theory of financial markets. He also wrote several review articles and multiple monographs. His book on path integrals has become a standard reference work.

== Awards ==
In 2008, Kleinert received the Max Born Medal and Prize of the German Physical Society for his contributions to theoretical physics. The award recognized his work on path integrals and gauge field theories in both particle and condensed matter physics.

On the occasion of his 60th birthday in 2001, a Festschrift titled Fluctuating Paths and Fields was dedicated to Kleinert.

== Books ==
- Gauge Fields in Condensed Matter, Vol. I, " Superflow and Vortex Lines", pp. 1–742, Vol. II, "Stresses and Defects", pp. 743–1456, World Scientific (Singapore, 1989); Paperback ISBN 9971-5-0210-0 (also available online: Vol. I and Vol. II)
- Critical Properties of φ^{4}-Theories, World Scientific (Singapore, 2001); Paperback ISBN 981-02-4658-7 (also available online) (together with V. Schulte-Frohlinde)
- Path Integrals in Quantum Mechanics, Statistics, Polymer Physics, and Financial Markets, 5th edition, World Scientific (Singapore, 2009) (also available online)
- Multivalued Fields in Condensed Matter, Electromagnetism, and Gravitation, World Scientific (Singapore, 2008) (also available online)
- Proceedings of the Eleventh Marcel Grossmann Meeting on General Relativity, World Scientific (Singapore, 2008) (together with R.T. Jantzen)
- Particles and Quantum Fields, World Scientific (Singapore, 2016) (also available online)
