= Wolfgang A. Tomé =

German physicist

Wolfgang Axel Tomé
- Born: Ludwigsburg, Germany
- Citizenship: United States of America
- Education: University of Florida; University of Denver; University of Tübingen
- Spouse: Marie-Jacqueline Tomé
- Children: 2
- Awards: Scholar of the Studienstiftung des Deutschen Volkes (1987); Doctoral Scholar of the Studienstiftung des Deutschen Volkes (1992); Fellow, American Association of Physicists in Medicine (FAAPM) (2010); Fellow, American Society for Radiation Oncology (FASTRO) (2017); The Peter R. Almond Award of Excellence for an Outstanding Radiation Measurements Article in JACMP 2024 (2025)
- Scientific career
- Fields: Physics, mathematics, medical physics, neurology, radiation biology, radiation oncology
- Workplaces: Albert Einstein College of Medicine; Montefiore Einstein Medical Center; University of Wisconsin; University of Wollongong
- Thesis: Quantization and Representation Independent Propagators (1995)
- Doctoral advisor: John R. Klauder
- Other academic advisors: Stanley P. Gudder

Wolfgang Axel Tomé is a German American physicist working in medicine as a researcher, inventor, and educator. He is noted for his contributions to the use of optically guided patient positioning techniques in high precision radiation therapy; his work on risk adaptive radiation therapy which is based on the risk level for recurrence in tumor sub-volumes using biological objective functions; the development of hippocampal avoidant cranial radiation therapy techniques to alleviate hippocampal-dependent neurocognitive impairment following cranial irradiation; and the invention of temporally modulated pulsed radiation therapy for the treatment of tumors exhibiting low dose hyper-radiation sensitivity.

Tomé is the author of Path Integrals on Group manifolds and co-author of Dose Painting IMRT Using Biological Parameters. He serves as Professor in the Departments of Radiation Oncology and Neurology at the Albert Einstein College of Medicine. Prior to this appointment, he served as Professor in the Departments of Medical Physics, Human Oncology, and Biomedical Engineering at the University of Wisconsin–Madison. In 2025, he was awarded Professor Emeritus status by the University of Wisconsin. Together with Anatoly Pinchuk and Jamey Weichert, he is an inventor of long-lived tumor-specific Gadolinium-based agents for imaging and therapy. He has published more than 300 articles in medical and mathematical physics. He is also credited on 11 patents. In addition, he has participated in several AAPM task groups, including the AAPM Working Group on Biological Effects of Hypofractionated Radiotherapy/SBRT.

In recognition of his contributions to the fields of medical physics and radiation oncology he been made a Fellow of the American Association of Physicists in Medicine (FAAPM) in 2010, and Fellow of the American Society for Radiation Oncology (FASTRO) in 2017.
