= Akanksha Infertility Clinic =

Hospital in India

The Akanksha Infertility Clinic is a women's health centre located in Anand, Gujarat, India, and headed by Dr. Nayna Patel. The clinic was founded in 1999, and was originally focused on In Vitro Fertilization. India declared commercial surrogacy legal in 2002, however the clinic did not begin to do surrogacy until 2004. Patel, who appeared on Oprah Winfrey's talk show in 2007, has produced more than 1000 surrogate babies as of October 2015.

Patel stated that "[the clinic] provide[s] a legitimate service to those in need, whether it is the couple who desperately want a child or the woman who wishes to change her circumstances, to educate her children, build a house or pay off debts."

== Surrogacy ==
Surrogacy at the clinic involves an infertile couple going to the clinic and requesting a surrogate. The surrogate will then be implanted with an egg and sperm, and, if the birth was successful, give up the child to the couple to raise it. The surrogates are then paid around 400,000 rupees ($6,500), while couples are charged an average of $25,000 to $30,000 per baby.

Of the women who work as surrogates "nearly half described themselves as housewives and the rest were a mix of domestic, service, and manual laborers". Most of them are married and have children of their own. They must live at the clinic, are heavily monitored and restricted, and are not allowed sex for the duration of their pregnancy. Their young children are allowed to stay with them, as a way to prevent the women from getting attached to the baby they are carrying. During their required stay "residents are offered daily English classes and weekly lessons in computer use" and the director "arranges film screenings and gives out school backpacks and pencil boxes to surrogates' children".

Akanksha claims an implantation success rate of 44%, similar to other Indian clinics, compared with a US norm of 31%.

== Controversy ==
The clinic is shrouded in the usual controversies around surrogacy, especially since it's headed by Dr. Patel, a well-known advocate for surrogacy.

== Legislation ==
=== Ban on surrogacy ===
In October 2015 a letter was sent by the Indian Council of Medical Research (ICMR) banning foreign couples from getting Indian surrogates. This sparked public outcry and protests with some people being concerned about the effect the ban will have on the economy of Anand, the place the Akanksha Clinic is based.

=== Protections ===
In 2008 a law — the Assisted Reproductive Technologies Bill (ART) — was introduced to protect surrogates, the children and the commissioning parents. Dr. Anup Gupta, the founder of Delhi IVF, a clinic that handles five to six cases a month, said that "The legislation will facilitate surrogacy".

== See also ==
- Gynaecworld Clinic
- Commercial surrogacy in India
- Fertility tourism
