= Sandra Chidinma Duru =

Nigerian politician

- Born: August 16, 1982 (age 44)
- Other name: Sandra Duru-Eluobi
- Education: Escae Benin University (BSc)
- Alma mater: African American University (PhD)
- Occupations: Public-policy scholar, politician, media executive
- Organization: Pre-Adult Affairs Organization
- Known for: Founder of Pre-Adult Affairs Organization (PAAO)
- Title: Professor of Public Policy, International American University
- Awards: Nigerian Ambassador to Ivory Coast Excellence Award (2014)

Sandra Chidinma Duru is a Nigerian-American public-policy scholar, who is the founder of the Pre-Adult Affairs Organization (PAAO).

== Education ==
Duru was born in Imo State, Nigeria.She has a degree from Escae Benin University, and received a PhD in Public Policy and Administration at African American University in 2025. She registered her first non-governmental organisation at the age of 17.

== Career ==
She was appointed Professor of Public Policy & Strategic Communications at the International American University, a private for-profit institution in Los Angeles, in 2023.

She has been Managing Director/CEO of Sanchhy Nigeria Limited, Zest Media and Entertainment, and Executives Cable and Electronics Company, and managed a boutique in Lagos.

In government, she played a role in the election of Rochas Okorocha as governor of Imo State in 2011 and has been an advisor to the Standards Organisation of Nigeria, the Police Women Unit, the Police Service Commission, and Kulfana Mining Company. In 2013 she considered forming her own political party and running for the state governorship herself.

She is the founder of Pre-Adult Affairs Organization, an NGO recognized by the United Nations; in 2015 she announced the launch of an associated TV programme aimed at 9–35-year-olds, Bare It Out! With Sandra Duru. In 2014, the Nigerian Ambassador to Ivory Coast, Ifeoma Akabogu-Chinwuba, honoured her for her "contributions to providing solutions to the unemployment, violence and educational problems in Nigeria". In 2016 she launched a new project, The Unity and Peace Project 2016–2020 (The Up Project).

She has recently contributed to Nigerian educational system by opposing the scrapping of Computer Science from school curriculum.
