= Duru–Kleinert transformation =

The Duru–Kleinert transformation, named after İsmail Hakkı Duru and Hagen Kleinert, is a mathematical method for solving path integrals of physical systems with singular potentials, which is necessary for the solution of all atomic path integrals due to the presence of Coulomb potentials (singular like $1/r$). The Duru–Kleinert transformation replaces the diverging time-sliced path integral of Richard Feynman (which thus does not exist) by a well-defined convergent one.

== Papers ==
- H. Duru and H. Kleinert, Solution of the Path Integral for the H-Atom, Phys. Letters B 84, 185 (1979)
- H. Duru and H. Kleinert, Quantum Mechanics of H-Atom from Path Integrals, Fortschr. d. Phys. 30, 401 (1982)
- H. Kleinert, Path Integrals in Quantum Mechanics, Statistics, Polymer Physics, and Financial Markets 3. ed., World Scientific (Singapore, 2004) (read book here)
