= Ad-Duruʽ =

Coordinates: 14°47′N 49°21′E

- Interactive map of Ad-Duruʽ
- Country: Yemen
- Governorate: Hadhramaut
- Time zone: UTC+3 (Yemen Standard Time)

Ad-Duruʽ is a village in eastern Yemen. It is located in the Hadhramaut Governorate.
