= Functional integration =

Integration over the space of functions

Functional integration is a collection of results in mathematics and physics where the domain of an integral is no longer an ordinary region of space, but a space of functions. Functional integrals appear in probability, in the study of partial differential equations, and in the path integral formulation to the quantum mechanics of particles and fields. While the term suggests an extension of ordinary integration, the lack of a translation-invariant measure on infinite-dimensional spaces means that functional integrals must be defined by more subtle methods or interpreted formally.

In an ordinary integral (in the sense of Lebesgue integration), there is a function to be integrated (the integrand) and a region of space over which to integrate the function (the domain of integration). The integral represents the limit of a sum obtained by dividing the region into smaller parts, evaluating the function on each, and adding up the results. For each small region, the value of the integrand cannot vary much, so it may be replaced by a single value. In a functional integral the domain of integration is a space of functions. For each function, the integrand returns a value to add up. Making this procedure rigorous poses challenges that continue to be topics of current research.

Functional integration was developed by Percy John Daniell in an article of 1919 and Norbert Wiener in a series of studies culminating in his articles of 1921 on Brownian motion. They developed a rigorous method (now known as the Wiener measure) for assigning a probability to a particle's random path. Richard Feynman developed another functional integral, the path integral, useful for computing the quantum properties of systems. In Feynman's path integral, the classical notion of a unique trajectory for a particle is replaced by an infinite sum of classical paths, each weighted differently according to its classical properties.

Functional integration is central to quantization techniques in theoretical physics. The algebraic properties of functional integrals are used to develop series used to calculate properties in quantum electrodynamics and the Standard Model of particle physics.

== Functional integration ==
Whereas standard Riemann integration sums a function f(x) over a continuous range of values of x, functional integration sums a functional G[f], which can be thought of as a "function of a function" over a continuous range (or space) of functions f. Most functional integrals cannot be evaluated exactly but must be evaluated using perturbation methods. The formal definition of a functional integral is
$$\int G[f]\; \mathcal{D}[f] \equiv \int_{\mathbb{R}}\cdots \int_{\mathbb{R}} G[f] \prod_x df(x)\;.$$
However, in most cases the functions f(x) can be written in terms of an infinite series of orthogonal functions such as $f(x) = \sum_{n=1}^{\infty}f_n H_n(x)$, and then the definition becomes
$$\int G[f] \; \mathcal{D}[f] \equiv \int_{\mathbb{R}} \cdots \int_{\mathbb{R}}  G(f_1; f_2; \ldots) \prod_n df_n\;,$$
which is slightly more understandable. The integral is shown to be a functional integral with a capital $\mathcal{D}$. Sometimes the argument is written in square brackets $\mathcal{D}[f]$, to indicate the functional dependence of the function in the functional integration measure.

== Examples ==
Most functional integrals are actually infinite, but often the limit of the quotient of two related functional integrals can still be finite. The functional integrals that can be evaluated exactly usually start with the following Gaussian integral:

$$\frac{\displaystyle\int \exp\left\lbrace-\frac{1}{2} \int_{\mathbb{R}}\left[\int_{\mathbb{R}} f(x)  K(x;y) f(y)\,dy +  J(x)  f(x)\right]dx\right\rbrace \mathcal{D}[f]}
{\displaystyle\int \exp\left\lbrace-\frac{1}{2} \int_{\mathbb{R}^2} f(x)  K(x;y)  f(y) \,dx\,dy\right\rbrace \mathcal{D}[f]} =
\exp\left\lbrace\frac{1}{2}\int_{\mathbb{R}^2} J(x) \cdot K^{-1}(x;y) \cdot J(y) \,dx\,dy\right\rbrace\,,$$

in which $K(x;y)=K(y;x)$. By functionally differentiating this with respect to J(x) and then setting to 0 this becomes an exponential multiplied by a monomial in f. To see this, let's use the following notation:

$G[f,J]=-\frac{1}{2} \int_{\mathbb{R}}\left[\int_{\mathbb{R}} f(x) K(x;y) f(y)\,dy + J(x) f(x)\right]dx\, \quad,\quad W[J]=\int \exp\lbrace G[f,J]\rbrace\mathcal{D}[f]\;.$

With this notation the first equation can be written as:

$\dfrac{W[J]}{W[0]}=\exp\left\lbrace\frac{1}{2}\int_{\mathbb{R}^2} J(x) K^{-1}(x;y) J(y) \,dx\,dy\right\rbrace.$

Now, taking functional derivatives to the definition of $W[J]$ and then evaluating in $J=0$, one obtains:

$\dfrac{\delta }{\delta J(a)}W[J]\Bigg|_{J=0}=\int f(a)\exp\lbrace G[f,0]\rbrace\mathcal{D}[f]\;,$

$\dfrac{\delta^2 W[J]}{\delta J(a)\delta J(b)}\Bigg|_{J=0}=\int f(a)f(b)\exp\lbrace G[f,0]\rbrace\mathcal{D}[f]\;,$

$\qquad\qquad\qquad\qquad\vdots$

which is the result anticipated. More over, by using the first equation one arrives to the useful result:

$$\dfrac{\delta^2}{\delta J(a)\delta J(b)}\left(\dfrac{W[J]}{W[0]}\right)\Bigg|_{J=0}=
K^{-1}(a; b)\;;$$

Putting these results together and backing to the original notation we have:

$\frac{\displaystyle\int f(a)f(b)\exp\left\lbrace-\frac{1}{2} \int_{\mathbb{R}^2} f(x) K(x;y) f(y)\, dx\,dy\right\rbrace \mathcal{D}[f]} {\displaystyle\int \exp\left\lbrace-\frac{1}{2} \int_{\mathbb{R}^2} f(x) K(x;y) f(y) \,dx\,dy\right\rbrace \mathcal{D}[f]} = K^{-1}(a;b)\,.$

Another useful integral is the functional delta function:

$$\int \exp\left\lbrace \int_{\mathbb{R}} f(x) g(x)dx\right\rbrace \mathcal{D}[f] = \delta[g] = \prod_x\delta\big(g(x)\big),$$

which is useful to specify constraints. Functional integrals can also be done over Grassmann-valued functions $\psi(x)$, where $\psi(x) \psi(y) = -\psi(y) \psi(x)$, which is useful in quantum electrodynamics for calculations involving fermions.

== Approaches to path integrals ==
Functional integrals where the space of integration consists of paths (ν = 1) can be defined in many different ways. The definitions fall in two different classes: the constructions derived from Wiener's theory yield an integral based on a measure, whereas the constructions following Feynman's path integral do not. Even within these two broad divisions, the integrals are not identical, that is, they are defined differently for different classes of functions.

=== The Wiener integral ===
In the Wiener integral, a probability is assigned to a class of Brownian motion paths. The class consists of the paths w that are known to go through a small region of space at a given time. The passage through different regions of space is assumed independent of each other, and the distance between any two points of the Brownian path is assumed to be Gaussian-distributed with a variance that depends on the time t and on a diffusion constant D:

$$\Pr\big(w(s + t), t \mid w(s), s\big) = \frac{1}{\sqrt{2\pi D t}} \exp\left(-\frac{\|w(s+t) - w(s)\|^2}{2Dt}\right).$$

The probability for the class of paths can be found by multiplying the probabilities of starting in one region and then being at the next. The Wiener measure can be developed by considering the limit of many small regions.

- Itō and Stratonovich calculus

=== The Feynman integral ===
- Trotter formula, or Lie product formula.
- The Kac idea of Wick rotations.
- Using x-dot-dot-squared or i S[x] + x-dot-squared.
- The Cartier DeWitt–Morette relies on integrators rather than measures

=== The Lévy integral ===
- Fractional quantum mechanics
- Fractional Schrödinger equation
- Lévy process
- Fractional statistical mechanics

== See also ==
- Feynman path integral
- Partition function (quantum field theory)
- Saddle point approximation
