= Duru Shah =

Indian gynecologist and academic

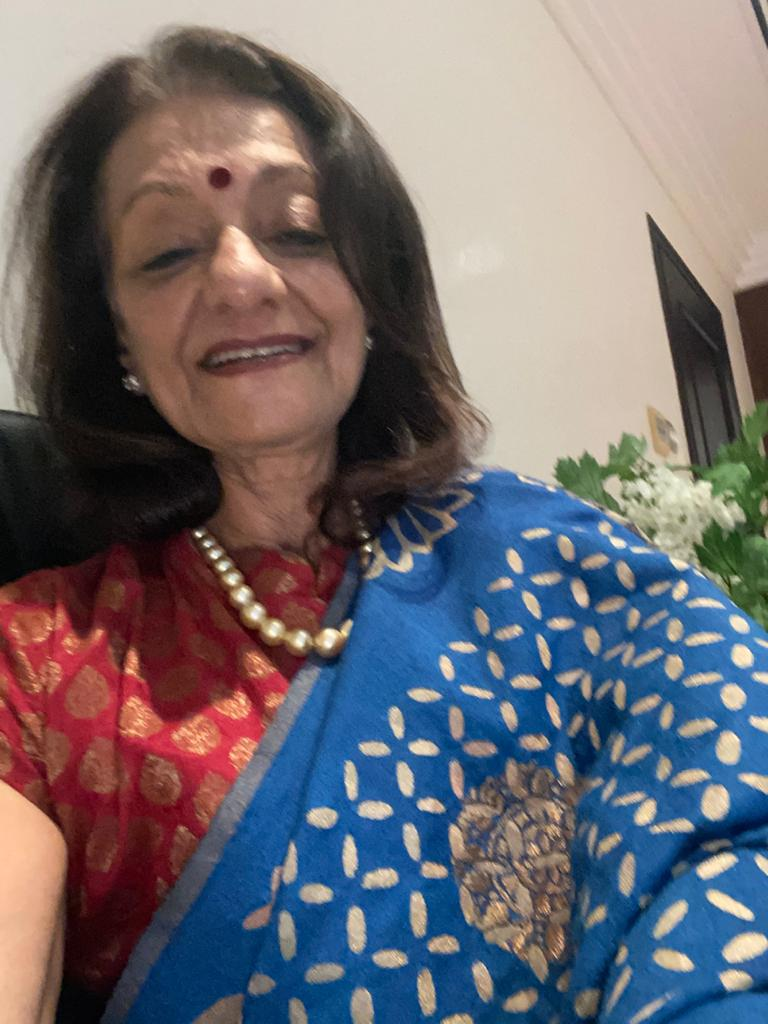
- Occupation: Gynecologist
- Known for: Promoting Women's Health
- Children: Ameera Shah
- Awards: Honorary fellowship of the Royal College of Obstetricians and Gynaecologists; Iconic Gynecologist & Fertility Expert

Duru Shah is an Indian gynaecologist and academic based in Mumbai, whose work includes reproductive medicine, infertility and women's reproductive health. She is the director of Gynaecworld, a women's health and fertility centre in Mumbai, and the founding president of the PCOS Society of India, which she established in 2015. Shah has served as president of the Federation of Obstetric and Gynaecological Societies of India (FOGSI) and the Indian Society for assisted reproduction (ISAR). Her work has also included adolescent reproductive-health education, including programmes aimed at educating young people about reproductive and sexual health.

== Early life and education ==
Shah completed her Bachelor of Medicine and Bachelor of Surgery (MBBS) at Grant Government Medical College, Mumbai. During her medical internship in 1971, she considered specialising in ophthalmology before choosing gynaecology. She began postgraduate training in gynaecology in 1972. She also obtained an MD in obstetrics and gynaecology from Grant Medical College and undertook residency training at Cama Hospital. In 2008, she received an honorary fellowship from the Royal College of Obstetricians and Gynaecologists (RCOG).

== Career ==
Shah began her career in obstetrics and gynaecology at Nowrosjee Wadia Maternity Hospital in Mumbai in 1977, where she worked as a senior registrar. She subsequently became a Lecturer at Grant Medical College, Mumbai. In 1981, Shah became a part-time research officer at Nowrosjee Wadia Maternity Hospital and the Indian Council of Medical Research, while establishing her private practice. In 1985, she became an honorary professor of obstetrics & gynaecology at Mumbai University's Nowrosjee Wadia Maternity Hospital. During her presidency of the Federation of Obstetric and Gynaecological Societies of India (FOGSI), Shah was associated with programmes addressing adolescent reproductive health and maternal health. These included ''Growing Up'', an adolescent reproductive and sexual health education programme; Kishori, an adolescent empowerment programme in Dharavi, Mumbai; and Save the Mothers, a rural maternal-health initiative. She was involved in the Kishori Adolescent Empowerment Project and the Save the Mother initiative. Shah has also been involved in postgraduate medical education. Her educational initiatives included FOGSI's Satellite School programme, conducted in association with the Indian Space Research Organisation, the postgraduate review course of the Indian College of Obstetricians and Gynaecologists (ICOG), and a postgraduate quiz organised through the Indian Menopause Society. She also directed an online tutorial programme for postgraduate students in obstetrics and gynaecology.

In May 2017, Shah became president of the Indian Society for Assisted Reproduction (ISAR). In her presidential address, she identified education, ethics and empathy as themes for the society's activities and advocated collaboration between the government and professional organisations to improve the accreditation of infertility-treatment centres.

Shah has also contributed to professional work on violence against women and sexual assault. As a member of the Ethics Committee of the International Federation of Gynecology and Obstetrics (FIGO), she was associated with the committee's work on ethical guidance concerning healthcare professionals' responses to violence against women and ethical issues following sexual assault.

Her work in this area also included FOGSI's cell on violence against women and the STAR programme (Survivor Treatment Advocacy & Responsibility), which addressed the collection of medical evidence in cases of sexual assault.

== Publications (Books) ==
- Practical Infertility Management (2002) ISBN 9788125022060
- The Polycystic Ovary Syndrome (2004) ISBN 9788125026334
- Fetal Attraction (2005) ISBN 9788179923528
- Clinical Progress in Obstetrics & Gynecology (2009) ISBN 9788184482157
- Pregnancy and You Plan, Prepare Push! (2016) ISBN 9788184958782
- Text Book on Obstetrics & Gynecology in perceptive, 2 Volume, First Edition Dr. Usha Krishna and Second Edition with Narendra Malhotra ASIN B08QS1RGMW
- Current Practice in Obstetrics & Gynecology- 3 Endometriosis (2023) ISBN 978-93-5696-156-2

== Editorial responsibilities ==
- Editor in chief, of the “Journal of Mid-life Health” of the Indian Menopause Society, 2012-2014-2016
- “Post Reproductive Health” Journal of the British Menopause Society, London, 2008 -2016
- “Climacteric” – the Journal of the International Menopause Society, 2010 onwards
- “The Obstetrician & Gynecologist”, the Journal of the Royal College of Obstetricians and Gynaecologists (RCOG) London, 2006 onwards
- The Journal of Human Reproductive Sciences (JRHS), the Journal of the Indian Society for Assisted Reproduction 2017 onwards.
- Editorial Board of "Gynecological and Reproductive Endocrinology and Metabolism", of the International Society of Gynaecological Endocrinology (ISGE)

== Positions held ==
- Director: Digital EducationInternational Menopause Society(IMS)2016-2018
- Past President of the Indian Society of Assisted Reproduction (ISAR) - 2017-2018
- Past President of the Indian Menopause Society
- Chair of the Special Interest Group (SIG) on Reproductive Endocrinology at ASPIRE (Asia Pacific Initiative on Reproduction)
- Chair of the Indian Special Interest Group (ISIG) at ASRM (American Society for Reproductive Medicine)
- International Advisor: Special Interest Group (SIG), “Safety & Quality in ART”(SQART)
- European Society of Human Reproduction & Embryology (ESHRE) 2019 -2021
- Chair of the Indian College of Obstetricians & Gynecologists (ICOG)
- Technical expert to the Ministry of Health, Government of India and WHO
- President of the Federation of Obstetric and Gynaecological Societies of India (FOGSI),
- President Mumbai Obstetric and Gynaecological Society (MOGS)
- Member of the Ethics Committee of FIGO

== Awards and recognition ==
- Honorary Fellowship of the Royal College of Obstetricians & Gynecology– November 2008.
- First Indian to receive international FIGO Distinguished Merit Award (2012)
- “OPPI Recognition Award” by Hon. Minister of State, Smt. Anupriya Patel, for outstanding contribution in the field of women’s health, Delhi, India, July 2018.
- Awarded the “Iconic Gynecologist & Fertility Expert” March 7, 2022, by the Honorable Bhagat Singh Koshyari (Governor of Maharashtra).
- “Mahatma Award 2021” for Social Responsibilities and Gender Equality, New Delhi by the Ex-Governor Ms. Kiran Bedi.
- Lifetime Achievement Award for Valuable Services rendered to FOGSI and lifelong Commitment to our Speciality”, by “The Federation of Obstetric & Gynecological Societies of India on January 10th, 2022.
- “MOGS- Dr. B. N. Purandare Outstanding Service Award” for Lifelong Commitment and Yeoman Services rendered to the Cause of Women’s Health & Rights, 19 March 2022.

== Philanthropy ==
She initiated project Kishori - an 8 years program for urban slum Dharavi. Which focussed on community-based adolescent empowerment. She also initiated a 10 year program called “Growing Up” in schools all over the country from 2000 to 2010 to educate young girls on their menstruation and puberty and adolescence.

She is the founder of the "Women's Empowerment Foundation," which is now known as the Metropolis Foundation. The Foundation has developed a health education app called "TooShyToAsk" with Metropolis Healthcare Limited.

Dr. Duru Shah also heads the PCOS Society of India. PCOS is a long term health problem, and she aims to update physicians on the latest research in the field. She organizes digital and in-person activities to share knowledge about PCOS with physician who deal with PCOS.

== Personal life ==
She is married to Sushil Shah who is the Chairman of Metropolis Healthcare and Chairs the Metropolis Foundation. She has two daughters, Aparna Shah, who is a Molecular Geneticist in Miami (USA) and Ameera Shah, who is the MD of Metropolis Healthcare, and has 3 grandchildren, Alisha, Neil and Karma.
