= İsmail Hakkı Duru =

Turkish physicist (1946–2025)

- Born: 6 December 1946; Bolu, Turkey
- Died: September 2025 (aged 78)
- Education: B.S, University of Ankara, Faculty of Science,1968; Ph.D, Theoretical High Energy Physics, University of Colorado, US, 1972
- Scientific career
- Fields: Physics
- Workplaces: Izmir Institute of Technology
- Doctoral advisor: Asım Orhan Barut

İsmail Hakkı Duru (6 December 1946 – September 2025) was a Turkish theoretical physicist and emeritus professor of Mathematics at the Izmir Institute of Technology where he was former dean of the science faculty.

== Publications ==
- Complete list at Google Scholar
- Complete list at SPIRES
