= Hasanpınar, Bismil =

Village in Turkey

Hasanpınar
- Neighbourhood
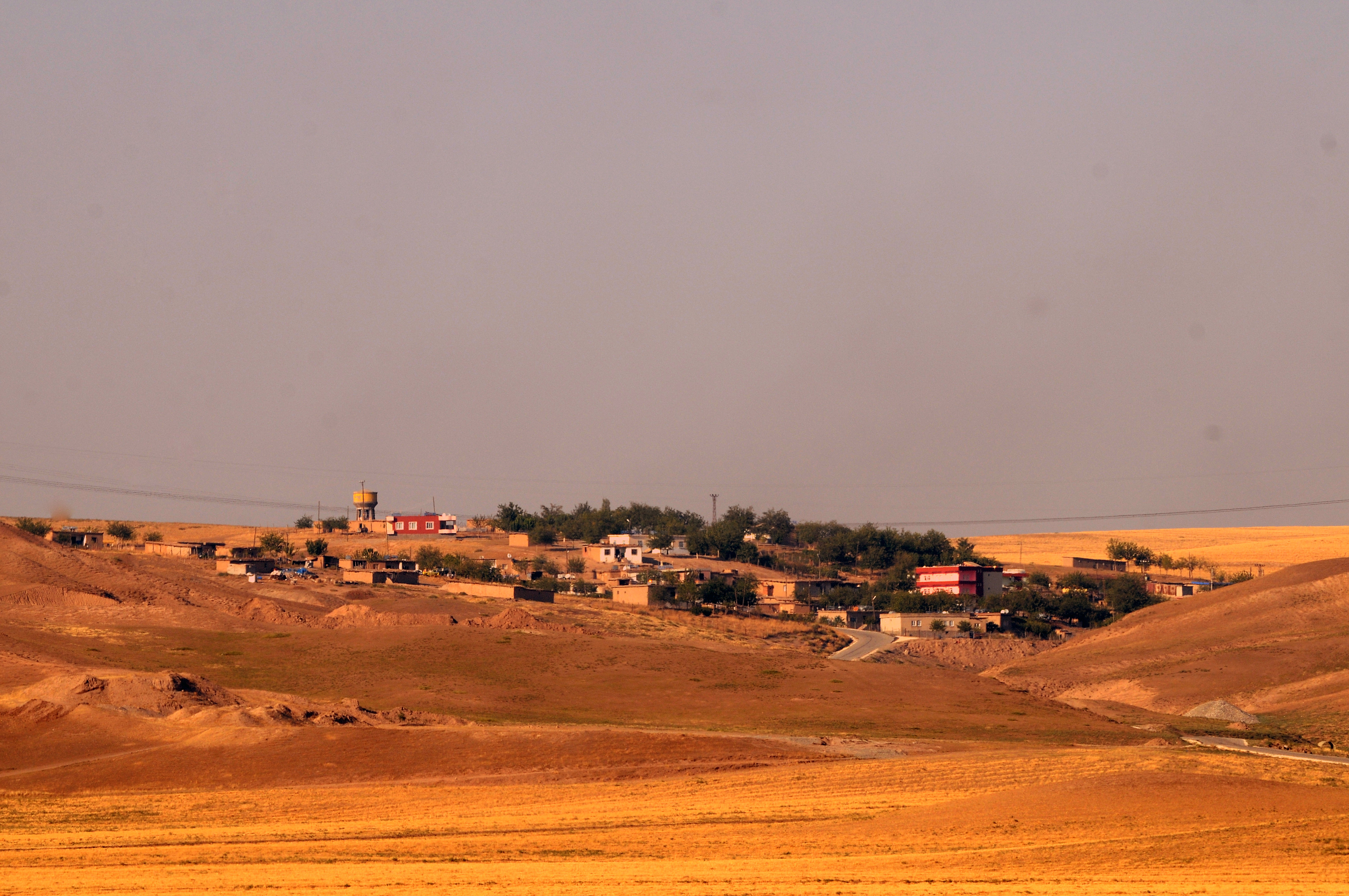

- Location within Turkey
- Coordinates: 37.89383°N 40.91702°E
- Country: Turkey
- Province: Diyarbakır
- District: Bismil
- Population (2022): 187
- Time zone: UTC+3 (TRT)

Hasanpınar (Note: Formerly known as Dervich P’eylivan, Dervish-Peylivan, Derveshi, Dervechi, Dervişi, Derviş.) is a neighbourhood in the municipality and district of Bismil, Diyarbakır Province in Turkey. The population was 187 in 2022.

== History ==
Dervich P’eylivan (today called Hasanpınar) was historically inhabited by Kurdish-speaking Armenians. There were 3 Armenian hearths in 1880. It was located in the kaza (district) of Silvan in the Diyarbakır sanjak in the Diyarbekir vilayet in c. 1900. The Armenians were attacked by the Belek, Bekran, Şegro, and other Kurdish tribes in May 1915 amidst the Armenian genocide.

== Bibliography ==
- Jongerden, Joost; Verheij, Jelle, eds. (2012). Social Relations in Ottoman Diyarbekir, 1870-1915. Brill.
- Kévorkian, Raymond H. (2006). "Demographic Changes in the Armenian Population of Diarbekir, 1895-1914". In Richard G. Hovannisian (ed.). Armenian Tigranakert/Diarbekir and Edessa/Urfa. Mazda Publishers.
- Kévorkian, Raymond (2011). The Armenian Genocide: A Complete History. I.B. Tauris.
