= Sulubağ, Silvan =

Village in Turkey

Sulubağ
- Neighbourhood
- Location in Turkey
- Coordinates: 38°05′19″N 40°47′23″E
- Country: Turkey
- Province: Diyarbakır
- District: Silvan
- Population (2022): 2,034
- Time zone: UTC+3 (TRT)

Sulubağ (Kurdish: Huseyna; Syriac: Al-Ḥsayniyyah) (Note: Also known as Huseynan, Hüseynan, Hüseyinağa, Hassin-Agha, Hassinan, Housseyna.) is a neighbourhood in the municipality and district of Silvan, Diyarbakır Province in Turkey. It is populated by Kurds and had a population of 2,034 in 2022.

== History ==
Al-Ḥsayniyyah (today called Sulubağ) was historically inhabited by Syriac Orthodox Christians and Kurdish-speaking Armenians. In the Syriac Orthodox patriarchal register of dues of 1870, it was recorded that the village had 1 household, who did not pay any dues, and did not have a church or a priest. There were 70 Armenian hearths in 1880. There was an Armenian church of Surb Astvatsatsin.

In September 1896, Armenians fled the village to neighbouring Kurdish villages so as to avoid tax collectors. It was located in the kaza (district) of Silvan in the Diyarbekir sanjak in the Diyarbekir vilayet in c. 1900. The Armenians were attacked by the Belek, Bekran, Şegro, and other Kurdish tribes in May 1915 amidst the Armenian genocide.

== See also ==
- Köprülübağ, Silvan

== Bibliography ==
- Bcheiry, Iskandar (2009). The Syriac Orthodox Patriarchal Register of Dues of 1870: An Unpublished Historical Document from the Late Ottoman Period. Gorgias Press.
- Tîgrîs, Amed; Çakar, Yıldız (2012). Amed : erdnîgarî, dîrok, çand (in Kurdish).
- Gaunt, David (2006). Massacres, Resistance, Protectors: Muslim-Christian Relations in Eastern Anatolia during World War I. Gorgias Press.
- Jongerden, Joost; Verheij, Jelle, eds. (2012). Social Relations in Ottoman Diyarbekir, 1870-1915. Brill.
- Kévorkian, Raymond H. (2006). "Demographic Changes in the Armenian Population of Diarbekir, 1895-1914". In Richard G. Hovannisian (ed.). Armenian Tigranakert/Diarbekir and Edessa/Urfa. Mazda Publishers.
- Kévorkian, Raymond (2011). The Armenian Genocide: A Complete History. I.B. Tauris.
