= Eskiköy, Silvan =

Village in Turkey

Eskiköy
- Neighbourhood
- Location in Turkey
- Coordinates: 38°09′58″N 40°56′55″E
- Country: Turkey
- Province: Diyarbakır
- District: Silvan
- Population (2022): 236
- Time zone: UTC+3 (TRT)

Eskiköy (Kurdish: Pîrexala; Syriac: Bīrā Ḫālā) (Note: Also spelt as Pireghalan, Piréghalan, Pir-Halu, Pir-Halou, Pirehalan, or Pirhalan.) is a neighbourhood in the municipality and district of Silvan, Diyarbakır Province in Turkey. It is populated by Kurds and had a population of 236 in 2022.

== History ==
Bīrā Ḫālā (today called Eskiköy) was historically inhabited by Syriac Orthodox Christians and Kurdish-speaking Armenians. In the Syriac Orthodox patriarchal register of dues of 1870, it was recorded that the village had eight households, who paid seventeen dues, and did not have a church or a priest. There were seven Armenian hearths in 1880. The Armenians were killed by the Belek, Bekran, Şegro, and other Kurdish tribes in May 1915 amidst the Armenian genocide.

== Bibliography ==
- Bcheiry, Iskandar (2009). The Syriac Orthodox Patriarchal Register of Dues of 1870: An Unpublished Historical Document from the Late Ottoman Period. Gorgias Press.
- Jongerden, Joost; Verheij, Jelle, eds. (2012). Social Relations in Ottoman Diyarbekir, 1870-1915. Brill.
- Kévorkian, Raymond H. (2006). "Demographic Changes in the Armenian Population of Diarbekir, 1895-1914". In Richard G. Hovannisian (ed.). Armenian Tigranakert/Diarbekir and Edessa/Urfa. Mazda Publishers.
- Kévorkian, Raymond (2011). The Armenian Genocide: A Complete History. I.B. Tauris.
- Tîgrîs, Amed; Çakar, Yıldız (2012). Amed : erdnîgarî, dîrok, çand (in Kurdish).
