= Yeşerdi, Silvan =

Village in Turkey

Yeşerdi
- Neighbourhood
- Location in Turkey
- Coordinates: 38°03′44″N 41°07′27″E
- Country: Turkey
- Province: Diyarbakır
- District: Silvan
- Population (2022): 366
- Time zone: UTC+3 (TRT)

Yeşerdi (Kurdish: Gundê Cano) (Note: Also known as Ghoundadjano, Ghundajano, Gündecano, Gündücano, Kontechano, Kontétchano, or Kunda-Jano.) is a neighbourhood in the municipality and district of Silvan, Diyarbakır Province in Turkey. It is populated by Kurds and had a population of 366 in 2022.

== History ==
Gundê Cano (today called Yeşerdi) was historically inhabited by Syriac Orthodox Christians and Kurdish-speaking Armenians. There were 105 Armenian hearths in 1880. There was an Armenian church of Surb Prkich. In 1914, it was populated by 50 Syriacs, according to the list presented to the Paris Peace Conference by the Assyro-Chaldean delegation. It was located in the kaza of Beşiri. The Armenians were killed by the Belek, Bekran, Şegro, and other Kurdish tribes in May 1915 amidst the Armenian genocide.

== Bibliography ==
- Gaunt, David (2006). Massacres, Resistance, Protectors: Muslim-Christian Relations in Eastern Anatolia during World War I. Gorgias Press.
- Jongerden, Joost; Verheij, Jelle, eds. (2012). Social Relations in Ottoman Diyarbekir, 1870-1915. Brill.
- Kévorkian, Raymond H. (2006). "Demographic Changes in the Armenian Population of Diarbekir, 1895-1914". In Richard G. Hovannisian (ed.). Armenian Tigranakert/Diarbekir and Edessa/Urfa. Mazda Publishers.
- Kévorkian, Raymond (2011). The Armenian Genocide: A Complete History. I.B. Tauris.
- Tîgrîs, Amed; Çakar, Yıldız (2012). Amed : erdnîgarî, dîrok, çand (in Kurdish).
