= Gündüz (disambiguation) =

Gündüz is a Turkish given name and a surname.

Gündüz may also refer to:

- Gece Gündüz, police procedural soap produced by the Altıoklar Productions
- Gündüz, Silvan, neighbourhood in Diyarbakır
