= Onbaşılar, Silvan =

Village in Turkey

Onbaşılar
- Neighbourhood
- Location in Turkey
- Coordinates: 38°14′01″N 40°58′26″E
- Country: Turkey
- Province: Diyarbakır
- District: Silvan
- Population (2022): 448
- Time zone: UTC+3 (TRT)

Onbaşılar (Kurdish: Baqûz) (Note: Also spelt as Ba-Khous, Ba-Khus, Bakous, Bakoz, Bakus, Bakuz, Bochas, or Bokuz.) is a neighbourhood in the municipality and district of Silvan, Diyarbakır Province in Turkey. It is populated by Kurds and had a population of 448 in 2022.

== History ==
Baqûz (today called Onbaşılar) was historically inhabited by Syriac Orthodox Christians and Kurdish-speaking Armenians. In the village, there is a late medieval or Ottoman bridge. There were three Armenian hearths in 1880. In 1914, there were 680 Syriacs at Baqûz, according to the list presented to the Paris Peace Conference by the Assyro-Chaldean delegation. The Armenians were killed by the Belek, Bekran, Şegro, and other Kurdish tribes in May 1915 amidst the Armenian genocide.

== Bibliography ==
- Gaunt, David (2006). Massacres, Resistance, Protectors: Muslim-Christian Relations in Eastern Anatolia during World War I. Gorgias Press.
- Jongerden, Joost; Verheij, Jelle, eds. (2012). Social Relations in Ottoman Diyarbekir, 1870-1915. Brill.
- Kévorkian, Raymond H. (2006). "Demographic Changes in the Armenian Population of Diarbekir, 1895-1914". In Richard G. Hovannisian (ed.). Armenian Tigranakert/Diarbekir and Edessa/Urfa. Mazda Publishers.
- Kévorkian, Raymond (2011). The Armenian Genocide: A Complete History. I.B. Tauris.
- Sinclair, T.A. (1989). Eastern Turkey: An Architectural & Archaeological Survey. Vol. III. Pindar Press.
