= Bağdere, Silvan =

Village in Turkey

Bağdere
- Neighbourhood
- Location in Turkey
- Coordinates: 38.1186°N 40.7358°E
- Country: Turkey
- Province: Diyarbakır
- District: Silvan
- Population (2022): 605
- Time zone: UTC+3 (TRT)

Bağdere (Kurdish: Başnîk; Syriac: Bāšnīq) (Note: Alternatively transliterated as Bachinik, Bachirik, Bachnegh, Bachnic, Bachnik’, or Başnik.) is a neighbourhood in the municipality and district of Silvan, Diyarbakır Province in Turkey. It is populated by Kurds and had population of 605 in 2022.

== History ==
Bāšnīq (today called Bağdere) was historically inhabited by Syriac Orthodox Christians and Kurdish-speaking Armenians. In the Syriac Orthodox patriarchal register of dues of 1870, it was recorded that the village had twelve households, who paid sixty-three dues, and did not have a priest. There was a church of Yūldaṯ Alohō. There were three Armenian hearths in 1880. In 1914, there were 200 Syriacs at Bāšnīq, according to the list presented to the Paris Peace Conference by the Assyro-Chaldean delegation. The Armenians were killed by the Belek, Bekran, Şegro, and other Kurdish tribes in May 1915 amidst the Armenian genocide.

== Bibliography ==
- Bcheiry, Iskandar (2009). The Syriac Orthodox Patriarchal Register of Dues of 1870: An Unpublished Historical Document from the Late Ottoman Period. Gorgias Press.
- Gaunt, David (2006). Massacres, Resistance, Protectors: Muslim-Christian Relations in Eastern Anatolia during World War I. Gorgias Press.
- Jongerden, Joost; Verheij, Jelle, eds. (2012). Social Relations in Ottoman Diyarbekir, 1870-1915. Brill.
- Kévorkian, Raymond H. (2006). "Demographic Changes in the Armenian Population of Diarbekir, 1895-1914". In Richard G. Hovannisian (ed.). Armenian Tigranakert/Diarbekir and Edessa/Urfa. Mazda Publishers.
- Kévorkian, Raymond (2011). The Armenian Genocide: A Complete History. I.B. Tauris.
- Tîgrîs, Amed; Çakar, Yıldız (2012). Amed : erdnîgarî, dîrok, çand (in Kurdish).
