= Alibey, Silvan =

Village in Turkey

Alibey
- Neighbourhood
- Location in Turkey
- Coordinates: 38.0997°N 40.8275°E
- Country: Turkey
- Province: Diyarbakır
- District: Silvan
- Population (2022): 540
- Time zone: UTC+3 (TRT)

Alibey (Kurdish: Mîreliya; Syriac: Mīr ʿAlī) (Note: Also known as Mer-Elias, Miralia, Miraliyan, Miralyan, Miramya, Mir Alié, Mir-Oulian, or Mir-Ulian.) is a neighbourhood in the municipality and district of Silvan, Diyarbakır Province in Turkey. It is populated by Kurds and had population of 540 in 2022.

== History ==
Mīr ʿAlī (today called Alibey) was historically inhabited by Syriac Orthodox Christians and Kurdish-speaking Armenians. In the Syriac Orthodox patriarchal register of dues of 1870, it was recorded that the village had 10 households, who paid 45 dues, and did not have a church or a priest. There were 30 Armenian hearths in 1880. There was an Armenian church of Surb Gevorg. In 1914, there were 100 Syriacs at Mīr ʿAlī, according to the list presented to the Paris Peace Conference by the Assyro-Chaldean delegation. The Armenians were killed by the Belek, Bekran, Şegro, and other Kurdish tribes in May 1915 amidst the Armenian genocide.

== Bibliography ==
- Bcheiry, Iskandar (2009). The Syriac Orthodox Patriarchal Register of Dues of 1870: An Unpublished Historical Document from the Late Ottoman Period. Gorgias Press.
- Gaunt, David (2006). Massacres, Resistance, Protectors: Muslim-Christian Relations in Eastern Anatolia during World War I. Gorgias Press.
- Jongerden, Joost; Verheij, Jelle, eds. (2012). Social Relations in Ottoman Diyarbekir, 1870-1915. Brill.
- Kévorkian, Raymond H. (2006). "Demographic Changes in the Armenian Population of Diarbekir, 1895-1914". In Richard G. Hovannisian (ed.). Armenian Tigranakert/Diarbekir and Edessa/Urfa. Mazda Publishers.
- Kévorkian, Raymond (2011). The Armenian Genocide: A Complete History. I.B. Tauris.
- Tîgrîs, Amed; Çakar, Yıldız (2012). Amed : erdnîgarî, dîrok, çand (in Kurdish).
