= Akdere, Silvan =

Village in Turkey

Akdere
- Neighbourhood
- Location in Turkey
- Coordinates: 38.0838°N 41.0467°E
- Country: Turkey
- Province: Diyarbakır
- District: Silvan
- Population (2022): 569
- Time zone: UTC+3 (TRT)

Akdere (Kurdish: Tirbespî) (Note: Also known as Tırbesupi, Türbeisipi, Tirbessibi, T’erbé-Sebi, Tirbesibi, and Terbe-Sebi.) is a neighbourhood in the municipality and district of Silvan, Diyarbakır Province in Turkey. It is populated by Kurds and had a population of 569 in 2022.

== History ==
Tirbessibi (today called Akdere) was historically inhabited by Kurdish-speaking Armenians. There were 60 Armenian hearths in 1880. There was an Armenian church of Surb Gevorg. It was located in the kaza (district) of Silvan in the Diyarbekir sanjak in the Diyarbekir vilayet in c. 1900. The Armenians were attacked by the Belek, Bekran, Şegro, and other Kurdish tribes in May 1915 amidst the Armenian genocide.

== Bibliography ==
- Jongerden, Joost; Verheij, Jelle, eds. (2012). Social Relations in Ottoman Diyarbekir, 1870-1915. Brill.
- Kévorkian, Raymond H. (2006). "Demographic Changes in the Armenian Population of Diarbekir, 1895-1914". In Richard G. Hovannisian (ed.). Armenian Tigranakert/Diarbekir and Edessa/Urfa. Mazda Publishers.
- Kévorkian, Raymond (2011). The Armenian Genocide: A Complete History. I.B. Tauris.
