= Köprülübağ, Silvan =

Hamlet in Turkey

Köprülübağ
- Settlement
- Location in Turkey
- Coordinates: 38.06911°N 40.80288°E
- Country: Turkey
- Province: Diyarbakır
- District: Silvan
- Time zone: UTC+3 (TRT)

Köprülübağ (Syriac: Kinyāt) (Note: Also known as Koprubag, Kinyat, Kimyad, Kebmiad, K’eniad, Ginniat’, and Keniad.) is a hamlet in the municipality and district of Silvan, Diyarbakır Province in Turkey.

== History ==
Kinyāt (today called Köprülübağ) was historically inhabited by Syriac Orthodox Christians and Kurdish-speaking Armenians. In the Syriac Orthodox patriarchal register of dues of 1870, it was recorded that the village had 2 households, who paid 35 dues, and did not have a church or a priest. There were 60 Armenian hearths in 1880. There was an Armenian church of Surb Astvatsatsin. It was located in the kaza (district) of Silvan in the Diyarbekir sanjak in the Diyarbekir vilayet in c. 1900. The Armenians were attacked by the Belek, Bekran, Şegro, and other Kurdish tribes in May 1915 amidst the Armenian genocide.

== Bibliography ==
- Bcheiry, Iskandar (2009). The Syriac Orthodox Patriarchal Register of Dues of 1870: An Unpublished Historical Document from the Late Ottoman Period. Gorgias Press.
- Jongerden, Joost; Verheij, Jelle, eds. (2012). Social Relations in Ottoman Diyarbekir, 1870-1915. Brill.
- Kévorkian, Raymond H. (2006). "Demographic Changes in the Armenian Population of Diarbekir, 1895-1914". In Richard G. Hovannisian (ed.). Armenian Tigranakert/Diarbekir and Edessa/Urfa. Mazda Publishers.
- Kévorkian, Raymond (2011). The Armenian Genocide: A Complete History. I.B. Tauris.
