= Bellibahçe, Silvan =

Village in Turkey

Bellibahçe
- Neighbourhood
- Location in Turkey
- Coordinates: 38°03′N 41°06′E
- Country: Turkey
- Province: Diyarbakır
- District: Silvan
- Population (2022): 97
- Time zone: UTC+3 (TRT)

Bellibahçe (Kurdish: Babudin) (Note: Also spelt as Babadin, Babadın, Babodin, or Bavodine.) is a neighbourhood in the municipality and district of Silvan, Diyarbakır Province in Turkey. It is populated by Kurds of the Elîkan tribe and had a population of 97 in 2022.

== History ==
Babudin (today called Bellibahçe) was historically inhabited by Syriac Orthodox Christians and Kurdish-speaking Armenians. In 1914, there were 100 Syriacs, according to the list presented to the Paris Peace Conference by the Assyro-Chaldean delegation. The Armenians were killed by the Belek, Bekran, Şegro, and other Kurdish tribes in May 1915 amidst the Armenian genocide.

== Bibliography ==
- Beşikçi, İsmail (1992). Doğu'da Değişim ve Yapısal Sorunlar Göçebe Alikan Aşireti (in Turkish).
- Gaunt, David (2006). Massacres, Resistance, Protectors: Muslim-Christian Relations in Eastern Anatolia during World War I. Gorgias Press.
- Jongerden, Joost; Verheij, Jelle, eds. (2012). Social Relations in Ottoman Diyarbekir, 1870-1915. Brill.
- Kévorkian, Raymond (2011). The Armenian Genocide: A Complete History. I.B. Tauris.
