= Doluçanak, Silvan =

Village in Turkey

Doluçanak
- Neighbourhood
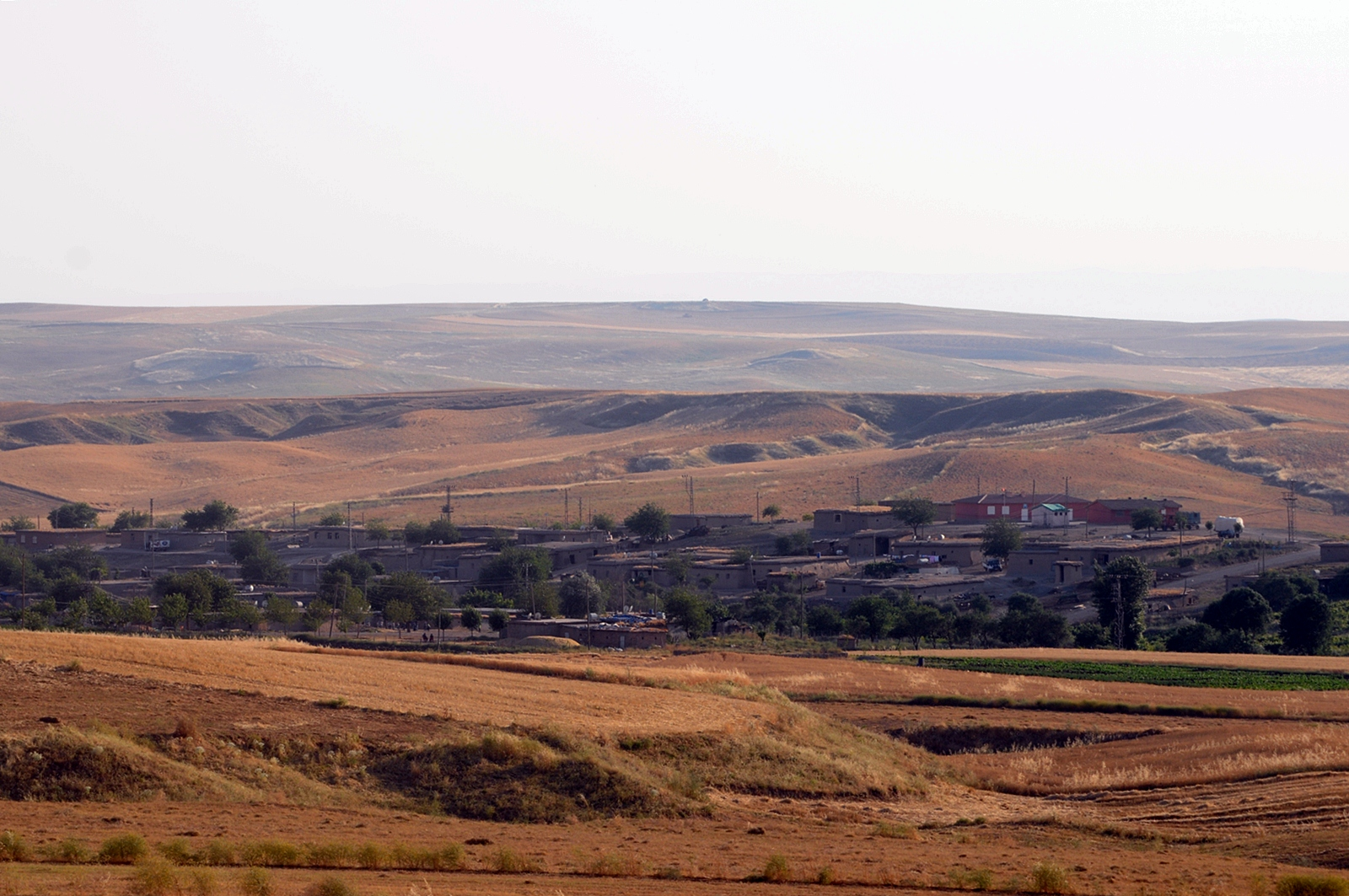

- Location within Turkey
- Coordinates: 38°01′00″N 40°43′27″E
- Country: Turkey
- Province: Diyarbakır
- District: Silvan
- Population (2022): 547
- Time zone: UTC+3 (TRT)

Doluçanak (Kurdish: Gulemîra) (Note: Also known as Golemiran, Gölemiran, Gül Emiran, Gülemiran, Gulémiré, Koule-Miran, Koulé-Miran, Mirek, or Mirèk.) is a neighbourhood in the municipality and district of Silvan, Diyarbakır Province, in Turkey. It is populated by Kurds and had a population of 547 in 2022.

== History ==
Gulemîra (today called Doluçanak) was historically inhabited by Syriac Orthodox Christians and Kurdish-speaking Armenians. In 1880, there were 11 Armenian hearths. There was an Armenian church of Surb Nshan. In 1914, it was populated by 200 Syriacs, according to the list presented to the Paris Peace Conference by the Assyro-Chaldean delegation. The Armenians were killed by the Belek, Bekran, Şegro, and other Kurdish tribes in May 1915 amidst the Armenian genocide.

== Bibliography ==
- Başarır, Özlem (2011). "XVIII.Yüzyılda Diyarbekir Voyvodalığının Mekansal Örgütlenmesi". The Journal of International Social Research (in Turkish). 4 (18).
- Gaunt, David (2006). Massacres, Resistance, Protectors: Muslim-Christian Relations in Eastern Anatolia during World War I. Gorgias Press.
- Jongerden, Joost; Verheij, Jelle, eds. (2012). Social Relations in Ottoman Diyarbekir, 1870-1915. Brill.
- Kévorkian, Raymond H. (2006). "Demographic Changes in the Armenian Population of Diarbekir, 1895-1914". In Richard G. Hovannisian (ed.). Armenian Tigranakert/Diarbekir and Edessa/Urfa. Mazda Publishers.
- Kévorkian, Raymond (2011). The Armenian Genocide: A Complete History. I.B. Tauris.
- Tîgrîs, Amed; Çakar, Yıldız (2012). Amed : erdnîgarî, dîrok, çand (in Kurdish).
