= Darköprü, Silvan =

Village in Turkey

Darköprü
- Neighbourhood
- Location in Turkey
- Coordinates: 38°08′09″N 40°49′01″E
- Country: Turkey
- Province: Diyarbakır
- District: Silvan
- Population (2022): 396
- Time zone: UTC+3 (TRT)

Darköprü (Kurdish: Aslo) (Note: Also spelt as Asılu, Aslou, or Aslu.) is a neighbourhood in the municipality and district of Silvan, Diyarbakır Province in Turkey. It is populated by Kurds and had a population of 236 in 2022.

== History ==
Aslo (today called Darköprü) was historically inhabited by Syriac Orthodox Christians and Kurdish-speaking Armenians. In 1880, there were 38 Armenian hearths. There was a church of Surb Daniel. In 1914, it was populated by 200 Syriacs, according to the list presented to the Paris Peace Conference by the Assyro-Chaldean delegation. The Armenians were killed by the Belek, Bekran, Şegro, and other Kurdish tribes in May 1915 amidst the Armenian genocide.

== Bibliography ==
- Gaunt, David (2006). Massacres, Resistance, Protectors: Muslim-Christian Relations in Eastern Anatolia during World War I. Gorgias Press.
- Jongerden, Joost; Verheij, Jelle, eds. (2012). Social Relations in Ottoman Diyarbekir, 1870-1915. Brill.
- Kévorkian, Raymond H. (2006). "Demographic Changes in the Armenian Population of Diarbekir, 1895-1914". In Richard G. Hovannisian (ed.). Armenian Tigranakert/Diarbekir and Edessa/Urfa. Mazda Publishers.
- Kévorkian, Raymond (2011). The Armenian Genocide: A Complete History. I.B. Tauris.
- Tîgrîs, Amed; Çakar, Yıldız (2012). Amed : erdnîgarî, dîrok, çand (in Kurdish).
