= Sinanköy, Bismil =

Village in Diyarbakır Province, Turkey

Sinanköy
- Neighbourhood
- Location in Turkey
- Coordinates: 37.862°N 40.995°E
- Country: Turkey
- Province: Diyarbakır
- District: Bismil
- Population (2022): 1,302
- Time zone: UTC+3 (TRT)

Sinanköy (Kurdish: Sinanê; Syriac: Sīnānī) is a neighbourhood in the municipality and district of Bismil, Diyarbakır Province in Turkey. The village is populated by Kurds of the Elmanî tribe and had a population of 1,302 in 2022.

== History ==
Sīnānī (today called Sinanköy) was historically inhabited by Syriac Orthodox Christians and Kurdish-speaking Armenians. In the Syriac Orthodox patriarchal register of dues of 1870, it was recorded that the village had three households, who paid five dues, and did not have a church or a priest. There were fifty Armenian hearths in 1880. The village had an Armenian church. It was located in the kaza of Beşiri. It is tentatively identified with the village of Sinoné, which was populated by 150 Syriacs in 1914, according to the list presented to the Paris Peace Conference by the Assyro-Chaldean delegation. The Armenians were attacked by the Belek, Bekran, Şegro, and other Kurdish tribes in May 1915 amidst the Armenian genocide.

== Bibliography ==
- Bcheiry, Iskandar (2009). The Syriac Orthodox Patriarchal Register of Dues of 1870: An Unpublished Historical Document from the Late Ottoman Period. Gorgias Press.
- Gaunt, David (2006). Massacres, Resistance, Protectors: Muslim-Christian Relations in Eastern Anatolia during World War I. Gorgias Press.
- Jongerden, Joost; Verheij, Jelle, eds. (2012). Social Relations in Ottoman Diyarbekir, 1870-1915. Brill.
- Kévorkian, Raymond H. (2006). "Demographic Changes in the Armenian Population of Diarbekir, 1895-1914". In Richard G. Hovannisian (ed.). Armenian Tigranakert/Diarbekir and Edessa/Urfa. Mazda Publishers.
- Kévorkian, Raymond (2011). The Armenian Genocide: A Complete History. I.B. Tauris.
