= Eşme (disambiguation) =

Eşme can refer to:

- Eşme
- Eşme, Silvan
- Eşme, Sungurlu
