= Sinanköy =

Sinanköy can refer to:

- Sinanköy, Bismil
- Sinanköy, Elâzığ
- Sinanköy, Lalapaşa
