= Akyol =

Akyol is a Turkish surname. Notable people with the surname include:

- Cenk Akyol (born 1987), Turkish basketball player
- Cigdem Akyol (born 1978), German journalist
- Mustafa Akyol (born 1972), Turkish journalist
- Gaye Su Akyol (born 1985), Turkish singer and bandleader
- Taner Akyol (born 1977), Turkish saz (musical instrument) or bağlama player and classical composer
- Türkan Akyol (1928–2017), Turkish physician, academic and first female government minister of Turkey

== See also ==
- Akyol, Silvan
