= Çardak, Silvan =

Village in Turkey

Çardak
- Neighbourhood
- Location in Turkey
- Coordinates: 38.1647°N 40.9708°E
- Country: Turkey
- Province: Diyarbakır
- District: Silvan
- Population (2022): 854
- Time zone: UTC+3 (TRT)

Çardak (Kurdish: Şifqet) is a neighbourhood in the municipality and district of Silvan, Diyarbakır Province in Turkey. It is populated by Kurds of the Bekiran tribe and had a population of 854 in 2022.
