= Arıköy, Silvan =

Village in Turkey

Arıköy
- Neighbourhood
- Location in Turkey
- Coordinates: 38°11′24″N 41°4′5″E
- Country: Turkey
- Province: Diyarbakır
- District: Silvan
- Population (2022): 479
- Time zone: UTC+3 (TRT)

Arıköy (Kurdish: Herşen) is a neighbourhood in the municipality and district of Silvan, Diyarbakır Province in Turkey. It is populated by Kurds and had a population of 479 in 2022.
