= Malabadi Bridge (1955) =

Malabadi Bridge Malabadi Köprüsü
- Coordinates: 39°09′13″N 41°12′13″E
- Carries: 2 lanes of the old D.360 road.
- Crosses: Batman river

Characteristics
- Longest span: 87.6 m (287 ft)

History
- Designer: Orhan Büyükalp
- Construction start: December 1954
- Opened: March 1955
- Replaces: Malabadi Bridge

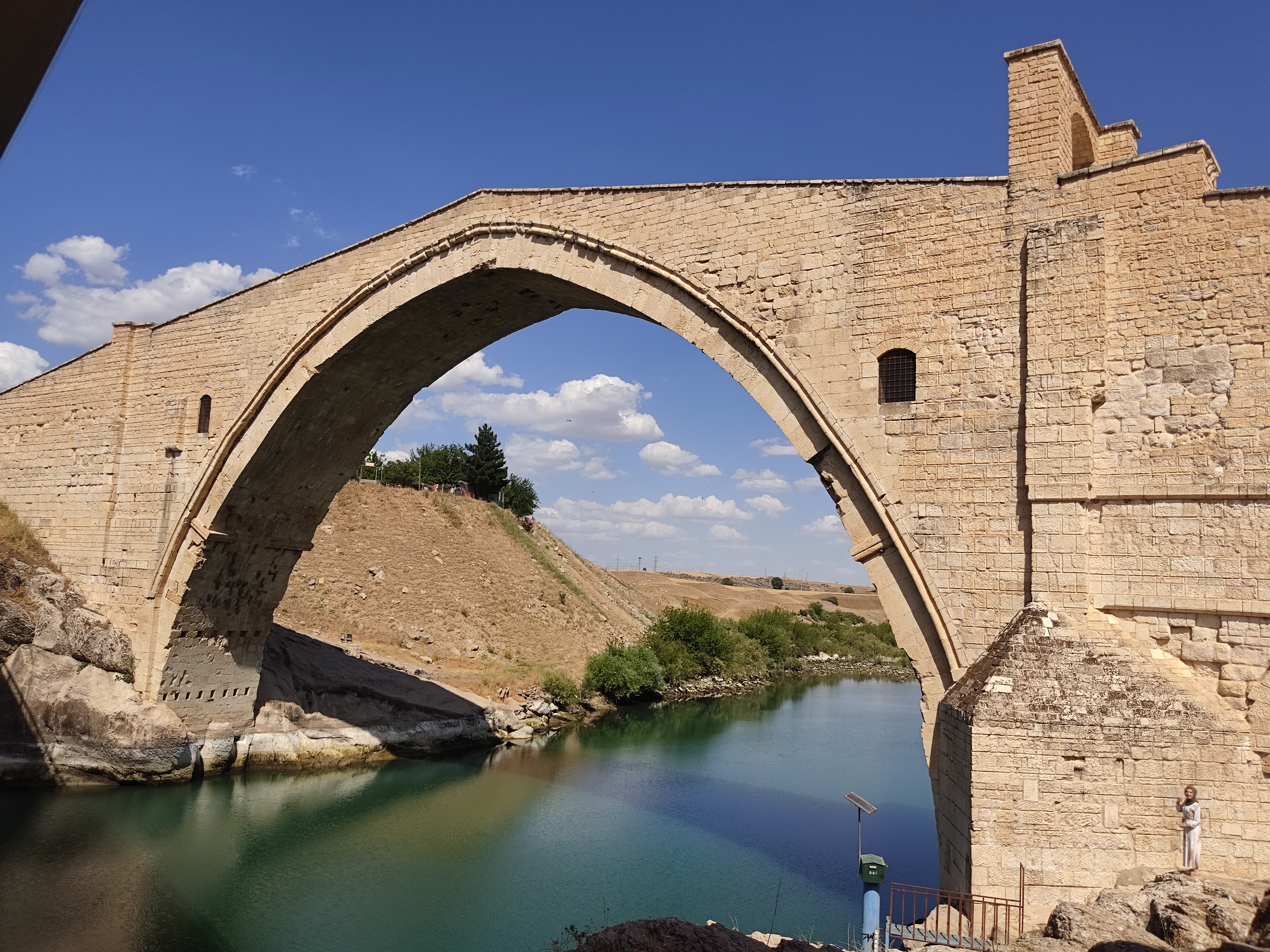
Malabadi Bridge 2.jpg

The Malabadi Bridge (Turkish: Malabadi Köprüsü) is an 87.6 m (287 ft) long, two lane, deck-arch bridge that crosses the Batman river near Çatakköprü, Diyarbakır Province. The bridge carries the old D.360 state road, as the current highway crosses a newer bridge just south of the two older bridges.

Construction of the bridge started in December 1954 and was completed in March 1955, just three and a half months later. With the opening of the bridge, it replaced the historic pointed-arch bridge adjacent to it.
