= Akçeltik, Silvan =

Village in Turkey

Akçeltik
- Neighbourhood
- Location in Turkey
- Coordinates: 38°06′17″N 41°09′51″E
- Country: Turkey
- Province: Diyarbakır
- District: Silvan
- Population (2022): 302
- Time zone: UTC+3 (TRT)

Akçeltik (Kurdish: Dêrikadêrûnê) is a neighbourhood in the municipality and district of Silvan, Diyarbakır Province in Turkey. It is populated by Kurds and had a population of 302 in 2022.
