= Dağcılar, Silvan =

Village in Turkey

Dağcılar
- Neighbourhood
- Location in Turkey
- Coordinates: 38°18′38″N 40°57′06″E
- Country: Turkey
- Province: Diyarbakır
- District: Silvan
- Population (2022): 213
- Time zone: UTC+3 (TRT)

Dağcılar (Kurdish: Cumat) is a neighbourhood in the municipality and district of Silvan, Diyarbakır Province in Turkey. It is populated by Kurds and had a population of 213 in 2022.
