= Aşağıveysi, Silvan =

Village in Turkey

Aşağıveysi
- Neighbourhood
- Location in Turkey
- Coordinates: 38.0677°N 40.9425°E
- Country: Turkey
- Province: Diyarbakır
- District: Silvan
- Population (2022): 446
- Time zone: UTC+3 (TRT)

Aşağıveysi (Kurdish: Weysikanê jêrîn) is a neighbourhood in the municipality and district of Silvan, Diyarbakır Province in Turkey. It is populated by Kurds and had population of 446 in 2022.
