= Akçayır, Silvan =

Village in Turkey

Akçayır
- Neighbourhood
- Location in Turkey
- Coordinates: 37.9916°N 40.9909°E
- Country: Turkey
- Province: Diyarbakır
- District: Silvan
- Population (2022): 560
- Time zone: UTC+3 (TRT)

Akçayır (Kurdish: Mêrgewaş) is a neighbourhood in the municipality and district of Silvan, Diyarbakır Province in Turkey. It is populated by Kurds and had population of 560 in 2022.
