= Sulak, Silvan =

Village in Turkey

Sulak
- Neighbourhood
- Location in Turkey
- Coordinates: 38.0187°N 40.9224°E
- Country: Turkey
- Province: Diyarbakır
- District: Silvan
- Population (2022): 323
- Time zone: UTC+3 (TRT)

Sulak (Kurdish: Avanek) is a neighbourhood in the municipality and district of Silvan, Diyarbakır Province in Turkey. It is populated by Kurds of the Bekiran tribe and had a population of 323 in 2022.
