= Babakaya, Silvan =

Village in Turkey

Babakaya
- Neighbourhood
- Location in Turkey
- Coordinates: 38.2524°N 41.0084°E
- Country: Turkey
- Province: Diyarbakır
- District: Silvan
- Population (2022): 334
- Time zone: UTC+3 (TRT)

Babakaya (Kurdish: Şewlera) is a neighbourhood in the municipality and district of Silvan, Diyarbakır Province in Turkey. It is populated by Kurds and had population of 334 in 2022.
