= Aşağıkaya, Silvan =

Village in Turkey

Aşağıkaya
- Neighbourhood
- Location in Turkey
- Coordinates: 38°03′18″N 40°38′47″E
- Country: Turkey
- Province: Diyarbakır
- District: Silvan
- Population (2022): 73
- Time zone: UTC+3 (TRT)

Aşağıkaya (Kurdish: Qeya jêrîn) is a neighbourhood in the municipality and district of Silvan, Diyarbakır Province in Turkey. It is populated by Kurds and had population of 73 in 2022.
