= Yeşilbahçe, Silvan =

Village in Turkey

Yeşilbahçe
- Neighbourhood
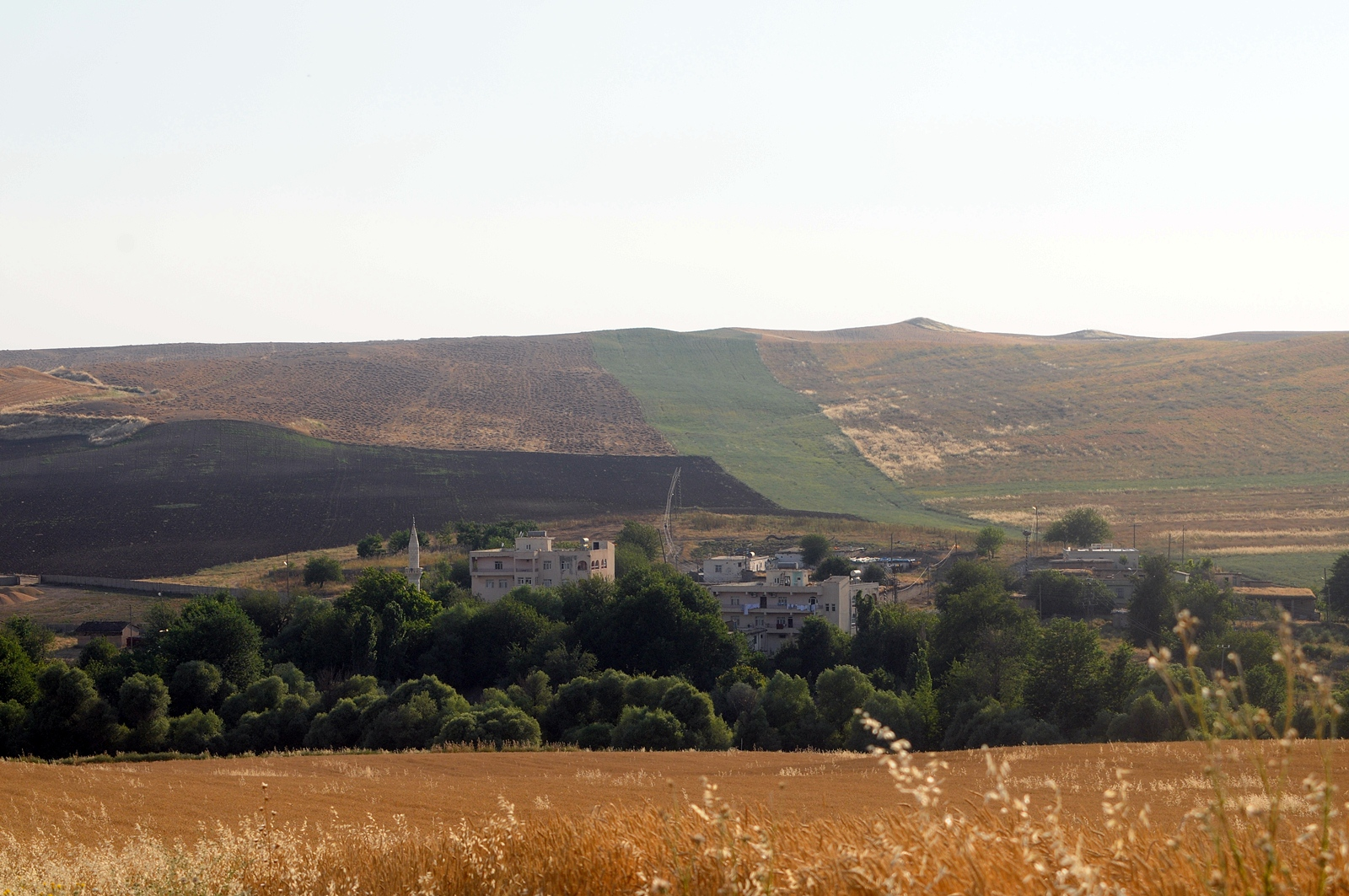

- Location within Turkey
- Coordinates: 38°01′37″N 40°48′39″E
- Country: Turkey
- Province: Diyarbakır
- District: Silvan
- Population (2022): 373
- Time zone: UTC+3 (TRT)

Yeşilbahçe (Kurdish: Dîda) is a neighbourhood in the municipality and district of Silvan, Diyarbakır Province in Turkey. It is populated by Kurds of the Bekiran tribe and had a population of 373 in 2022.
