= Keklikdere, Silvan =

Village in Turkey

Keklikdere
- Neighbourhood
- Location in Turkey
- Coordinates: 38°14′11″N 40°56′38″E
- Country: Turkey
- Province: Diyarbakır
- District: Silvan
- Population (2022): 558
- Time zone: UTC+3 (TRT)

Keklikdere (Kurdish: Tewerz) is a neighbourhood in the municipality and district of Silvan, Diyarbakır Province in Turkey. It is populated by Kurds and had a population of 558 in 2022.
