= Beytocan =

Kurdish singer and musician (1955–2023)

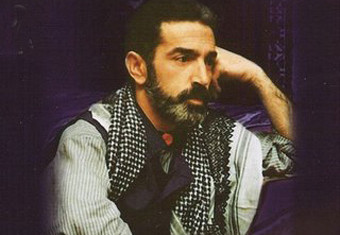
- Born: Beytullah Güneri; 1 October 1955; Silvan, Diyarbakır, Turkey
- Died: 12 September 2023 (aged 67); Stockholm, Sweden
- Occupations: Singer, musician
- Years active: 1980—2023

Beytullah Güneri (1 October 1955 – 12 September 2023), better known by the stage name Beytocan, was a Kurdish singer and musician.

== Biography ==
Born in Silvan, Diyarbakır on 1 October 1955, Güneri moved to the center of Diyarbakır with his family at the age of eight. After the 1980 Turkish coup d'état, he was sentenced to 15 years in prison. Freed in 1987, he moved to Istanbul.

At the suggestion of Selami Şahin, Güneri took the name "Beytocan" and began to release his poems. With Kurdish works banned in Turkey at the time, he released the satirical album 21 March Yan Mirin, Yan Diyarbekir, which secretly circulated among Kurdish militants.

In the 1990s, Güneri left Turkey for political reasons and moved to Sweden. After 23 years, he returned to Turkey, but shortly thereafter moved back to Sweden.

In 2021, a cancerous tumour was discovered under his tooth. Despite attempts to surgically remove it he died in Stockholm on 12 September 2023, at the age of 67.

== Discography ==
- Te nadin min (2001)
- Bîst û yekê adarê (2001)
- Etuna dilê min (2011)
