= Gökçetevek, Silvan =

Village in Turkey

Gökçetevek
- Neighbourhood
- Location in Turkey
- Coordinates: 38°02′26″N 40°42′20″E
- Country: Turkey
- Province: Diyarbakır
- District: Silvan
- Population (2022): 887
- Time zone: UTC+3 (TRT)

Gökçetevek (Kurdish: Reşik) is a neighbourhood in the municipality and district of Silvan, Diyarbakır Province in Turkey. It is populated by Kurds and had a population of 887 in 2022.
