= Güzderesi, Silvan =

Village in Turkey

Güzderesi
- Neighbourhood
- Location in Turkey
- Coordinates: 38°04′58″N 41°07′53″E
- Country: Turkey
- Province: Diyarbakır
- District: Silvan
- Population (2022): 255
- Time zone: UTC+3 (TRT)

Güzderesi (Kurdish: Şemrex) is a neighbourhood in the municipality and district of Silvan, Diyarbakır Province in Turkey. It is populated by Kurds and had a population of 255 in 2022.
