= Yuva, Silvan =

Village in Turkey

Yuva
- Neighbourhood
- Location in Turkey
- Coordinates: 38°02′28″N 41°02′56″E
- Country: Turkey
- Province: Diyarbakır
- District: Silvan
- Population (2022): 183
- Time zone: UTC+3 (TRT)

Yuva (Kurdish: Hêlîn) is a neighbourhood in the municipality and district of Silvan, Diyarbakır Province in Turkey. It is populated by Kurds of the Elîkan tribe and had a population of 183 in 2022.
