= Yolarası, Silvan =

Village in Turkey

Yolarası
- Neighbourhood
- Location in Turkey
- Coordinates: 38°07′53″N 40°53′16″E
- Country: Turkey
- Province: Diyarbakır
- District: Silvan
- Population (2022): 293
- Time zone: UTC+3 (TRT)

Yolarası (Kurdish: Qurtê) is a neighbourhood in the municipality and district of Silvan, Diyarbakır Province in Turkey. It is populated by Kurds and had a population of 293 in 2022.
