= Malabadi Bridge =

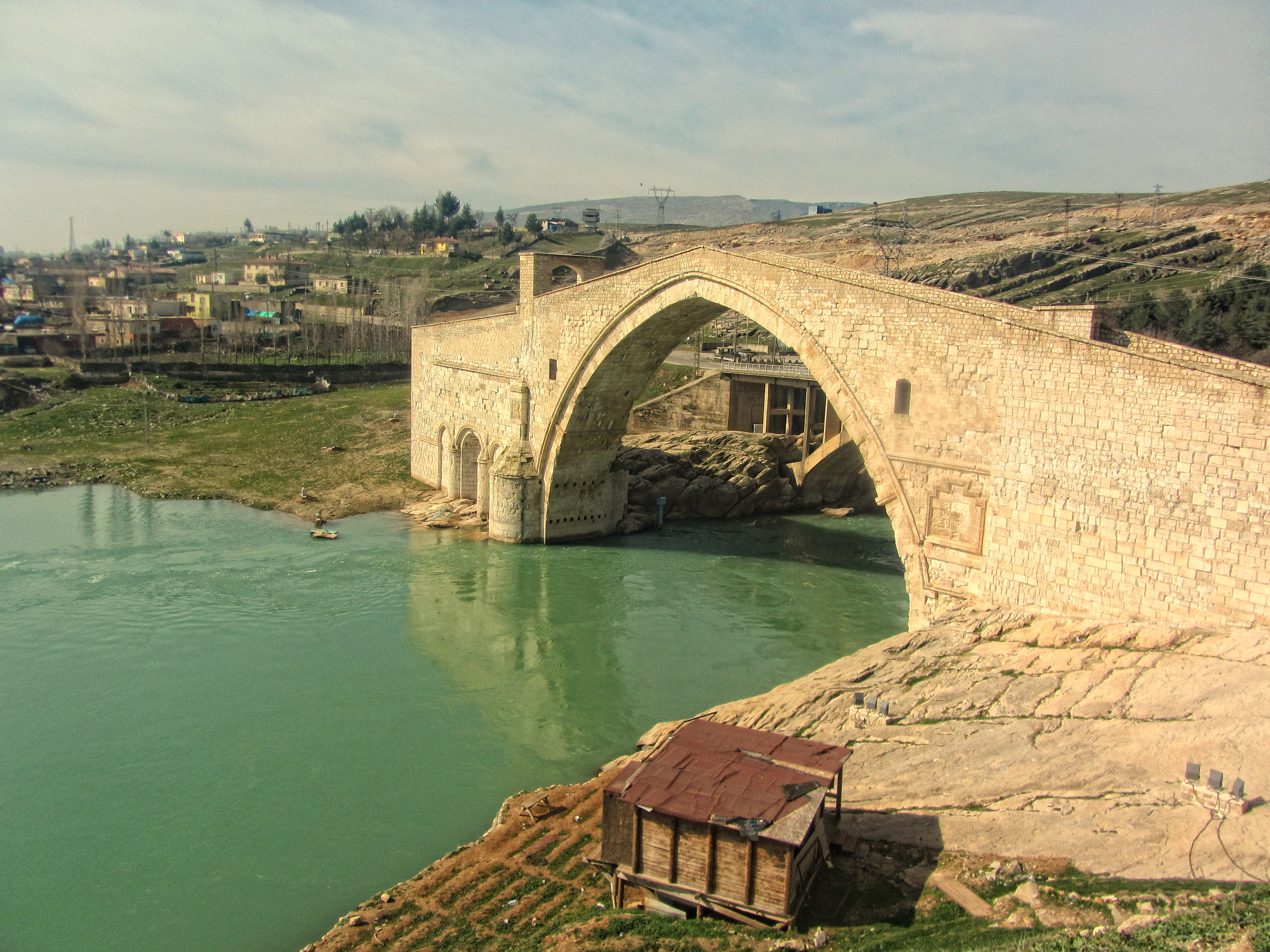
- The historic Malabadi bridge with the newer deck-arch bridge in the background.
- Coordinates: 38°09′13″N 41°12′13.8″E
- Crosses: Batman River
- Locale: Near Silvan, Diyarbakır Province, Eastern Anatolia region, Turkey

Characteristics
- Design: Pointed arch bridge
- Material: Stone
- Total length: 150 m (160 yd)
- Width: 7 m (23 ft)
- Height: 19 m (62 ft)
- Longest span: 38.6 m (127 ft)
- No. of spans: 1

History
- Construction start: 541 AH (1146/1147CE)
- Construction end: 548 AH (1153/1154CE)

The Malabadi Bridge or Karaman Bridge (Kurdish: Pira Mala Badî ("Bridge of the House of Badh"), Turkish: Malabadi Köprüsü) is an arch bridge spanning the Batman River near Malabadi village in Silvan in southeastern Turkey. Construction began in the year AD 1146/47 during the Artuqid period, and appears to have been completed by about 1154 (AH 549). The bridge was commissioned by Husam al-Din Timurtash of Mardin, son of Ilghazi, and grandson of Artuk Bey which one of the important commander of the Oghuz Turks.

According to the local 12th-century historian Ibn al-Azraq al-Farīqī, the contemporary bridge replaced one built in 668/69 (AH 48) that had collapsed in 1144 (AH 539). Inconsistencies between the two surviving manuscript copies of Ibn al-Azraq's account make it difficult to definitively identify the Malabadi bridge as the one he refers to as the Qaramān or Aqramān bridge. Nevertheless, many aspects of his geographical description and historical account support this identification.

Ibn al-Azraq says that construction of the current bridge was initiated by the Artuqid ruler of Mayafaraqin and Mardin al-Saʿīd Ḥusām al-Dīn Temür-Tash in 1146/47 (AH 541), under the supervision of al-Zāhid bin al-Ṭawīl. After al-Zāhid had built the bridge's eastern footing it was destroyed by floods. Al-Zāhid was fined for "defective craftsmanship" and replaced by Amir Saif al-Dīn Shīrbārīk Maudūd bin ʿAlī (bin Alp-Yaruq) bin Artuq. Shīrbārīk restarted the work under the supervision of Abuʾl-Khair bin al-Ḥakīm al-Fāsūl, who used massive timbers in the construction. By 1153 the bridge was nearly finished. However, at the time of the death of Ḥusām al-Dīn Temür-Tash on 18 January 1154, the arch was not yet complete. His successor, Najm al-Dīn Alpī, set about completing the bridge, and, although work was again interrupted by flooding, "[h]e built and repaired it and completed the joining of the arch."

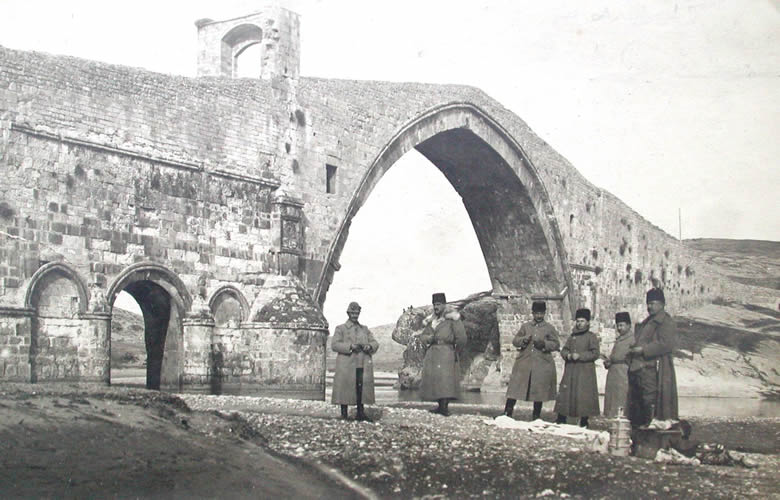
Karabekir and his staff at Silvan during World War I in 1918

The French architectural historian Albert Gabriel and epigraphist Jean Sauvaget visited the bridge in 1932 and Sauvaget discerned an inscription in the name of Temür-Tash with the year AH 542 (1147/48), which possibly corresponds to the start of the second construction under Shīrbārīk.

The bridge was restored in the late twelfth century, and recently in the beginning of the 20th century. It was once the only bridge across the river in this area, and was in continuous use until the 1950s, when a new road bridge was completed upstream.

The span of the bridge crosses perpendicular to the river, but the roadway is at an angle to the river, so there are angular breaks in the east and west approaches. The approaches rise from ground level to meet the central span, which is a pointed arch high over the deepest part of the river. Constructed from coloured solid masonry, the approaches have small arches built into them to let flood-waters through. Two of the piers of the bridge sit in the river; the western support is decorated with two carved figures, one standing and one sitting. The bridge is 150 m (160 yd) long and 7 m (23 ft) wide, 19 m (62 ft) in height and a main span of 38.6 m (127 ft). The roadway has two toll-booths, one either side of the main span. The spandrels of the main arch incorporate small rooms for weary travelers. The Malabadi Bridge in Silvan, Diyarbakır takes its name from Bad, (Badh ibn Dustak), the founder of the Marwanids. Malabadi means "house of Bad" in Kurdish.

In 2016 it was inscribed in the Tentative list of World Heritage Sites in Turkey.

== Sources ==
- Doğangün, A; Ural, A (2007). Characteristics of Anatolian stone arch bridges and a case study for Malabadi bridge (PDF). ARCH'07: 5th International Conference on Arch Bridges. pp. 179–186.
- Gabriel, Albert (1940), Voyages archéologiques dans la Turquie orientale [Archeological Travels in Eastern Turkey] (in French)
- Hillenbrand, Carole (1979). The History of the Jazīra 1100-1150: the contribution of Ibn Al-Azraq al-Fāriqī (PhD thesis). University of Edinburgh. p. 314, 317, 444, 445–447, 500, 549. hdl:1842/7341.
