= Çakıltaşı, Silvan =

Village in Turkey

Çakıltaşı
- Neighbourhood
- Location in Turkey
- Coordinates: 37°59′29″N 40°45′00″E
- Country: Turkey
- Province: Diyarbakır
- District: Silvan
- Population (2022): 83
- Time zone: UTC+3 (TRT)

Çakıltaşı (Kurdish: Emera) is a neighbourhood in the municipality and district of Silvan, Diyarbakır Province in Turkey. It is populated by Kurds and had population of 83 in 2022.
