= Kızlal, Silvan =

Village in Turkey

Kızlal
- Neighbourhood
- Location in Turkey
- Coordinates: 38°12′21″N 41°11′08″E
- Country: Turkey
- Province: Diyarbakır
- District: Silvan
- Population (2022): 757
- Time zone: UTC+3 (TRT)

Kızlal, also known as Yayageçer, (Kurdish: Qizlal) is a neighbourhood in the municipality and district of Silvan, Diyarbakır Province in Turkey. It is populated by Kurds and had a population of 757 in 2022.
