= Tokluca, Silvan =

Village in Turkey

Tokluca
- Neighbourhood
- Location in Turkey
- Coordinates: 38°03′54″N 40°51′15″E
- Country: Turkey
- Province: Diyarbakır
- District: Silvan
- Population (2022): 976
- Time zone: UTC+3 (TRT)

Tokluca (Kurdish: Çirik) is a neighbourhood in the municipality and district of Silvan, Diyarbakır Province in Turkey. It is populated by Kurds and had a population of 976 in 2022.
