= Demirkuyu, Silvan =

Village in Turkey

Demirkuyu
- Neighbourhood
- Location in Turkey
- Coordinates: 38°10′12″N 41°08′52″E
- Country: Turkey
- Province: Diyarbakır
- District: Silvan
- Population (2022): 658
- Time zone: UTC+3 (TRT)

Demirkuyu (Kurdish: Dêrikamiqûrê) is a neighbourhood in the municipality and district of Silvan, Diyarbakır Province in Turkey. It is populated by Kurds and had a population of 658 in 2022.

== Notable people ==
- Mahmut Kepolu (Parliamentarian from 1973 to 1980 for Motherland Party)
