= Çevriksu, Silvan =

Village in Turkey

Çevriksu
- Neighbourhood
- Location in Turkey
- Coordinates: 38°02′49″N 41°09′51″E
- Country: Turkey
- Province: Diyarbakır
- District: Silvan
- Population (2022): 528
- Time zone: UTC+3 (TRT)

Çevriksu (Kurdish: Girikê boto) is a neighbourhood in the municipality and district of Silvan, Diyarbakır Province in Turkey. It is populated by Kurds of the Bekiran tribe and had a population of 528 in 2022.
