= Bereketli, Silvan =

Village in Turkey

Bereketli
- Neighbourhood
- Location in Turkey
- Coordinates: 38.0133°N 40.9047°E
- Country: Turkey
- Province: Diyarbakır
- District: Silvan
- Population (2022): 138
- Time zone: UTC+3 (TRT)

Bereketli (Kurdish: Bereket) is a neighbourhood in the municipality and district of Silvan, Diyarbakır Province in Turkey. It is populated by Kurds and had population of 138 in 2022.
