= Yeniköy, Silvan =

Village in Turkey

Yeniköy
- Neighbourhood
- Location in Turkey
- Coordinates: 38°07′04″N 41°02′55″E
- Country: Turkey
- Province: Diyarbakır
- District: Silvan
- Population (2022): 267
- Time zone: UTC+3 (TRT)

Yeniköy (Kurdish: Zerbiya, Xirba) is a neighbourhood in the municipality and district of Silvan, Diyarbakır Province in Turkey. It is populated by Kurds and had a population of 267 in 2022.
