= Çaldere, Silvan =

Village in Turkey

Çaldere
- Neighbourhood
- Location in Turkey
- Coordinates: 38.2664°N 40.9294°E
- Country: Turkey
- Province: Diyarbakır
- District: Silvan
- Population (2022): 355
- Time zone: UTC+3 (TRT)

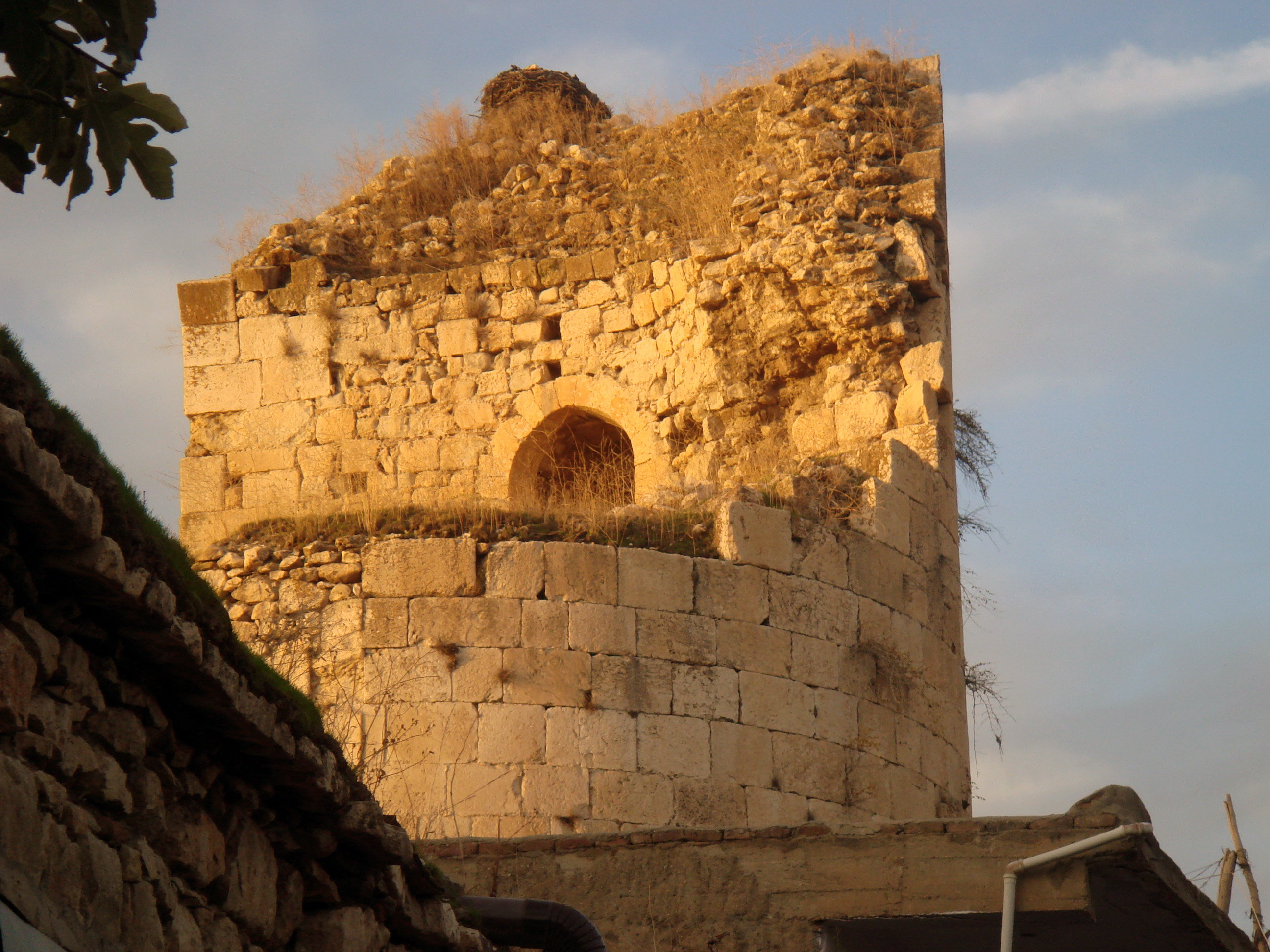
The Zembilfroş Castle

Çaldere (Kurdish: Fişat) is a neighbourhood in the municipality and district of Silvan, Diyarbakır Province in Turkey. It is populated by Kurds and had population of 355 in 2022.
