= Heybelikonak, Silvan =

Village in Turkey

Heybelikonak
- Neighbourhood
- Location in Turkey
- Coordinates: 38°03′17″N 40°44′43″E
- Country: Turkey
- Province: Diyarbakır
- District: Silvan
- Population (2022): 258
- Time zone: UTC+3 (TRT)

Heybelikonak (Kurdish: Qeyik) is a neighbourhood in the municipality and district of Silvan, Diyarbakır Province in Turkey. It is populated by Kurds and had a population of 258 in 2022.
