= Silvan ambush =

PKK attack on Turkish military convoy (2011)

- Part of Kurdish–Turkish Conflict
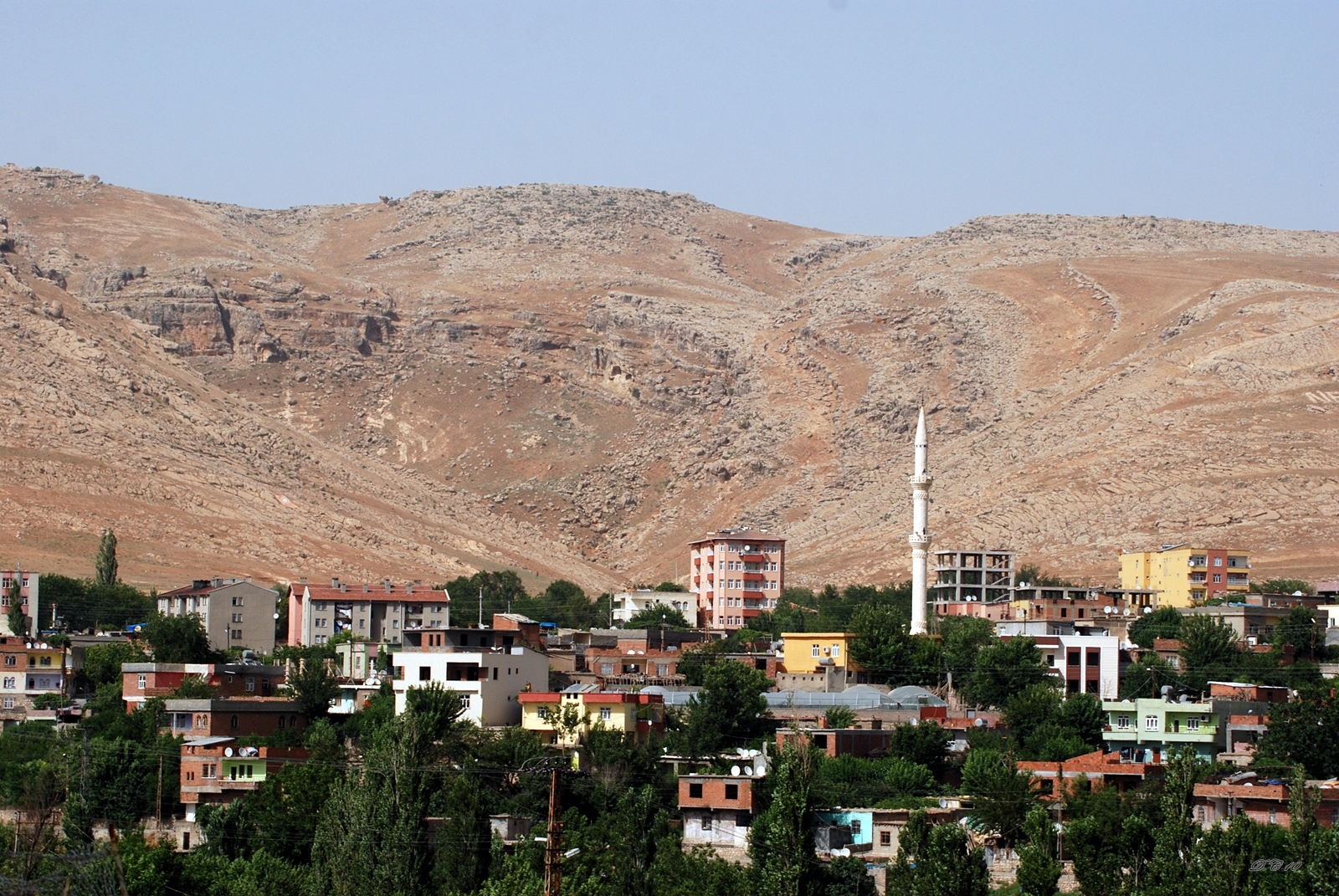
- Silvan, as seen in 2010
Date	14 July 2011
Location	Silvan, Turkey
Result	Inconclusive

Belligerents
Turkey	Kurdistan Workers' Party

Casualties and losses
13 killed, 7 wounded	7 killed, unknown wounded

The Silvan ambush (July 14, 2011) was an ambush on the Turkish Army by PKK insurgents, which inflicted heavy casualties on both sides. The ambush took place in a forest around the town of Silvan. The Turkish forces were taken by surprise and suffered considerable casualties, before launching a counterattack.

The ambush took place in a forest, the isolated position had given the insurgents initial success, catching the Turkish army by surprise and inflicting heavy casualties. However, the Turkish army had managed to regroup and return fire, killing seven Kurdish militants.

== Background ==
Silvan is a district and municipality in the Diyarbakir province and is situated in a province of ethnic strife. Silvan and the wider Diyarbakir area were to be seen as Kurdish lands, but did not occur due to subsequent events, when it was incorporated into the Republic of Turkey. Diyarbakir is seen as a de facto capital of Turkish Kurdistan by some. However, it is governed by the Turkish government, which the PKK detests and so it operates in the province as a result.

== Battle ==
The PKK intended to catch the Turkish forces by surprise and ambushed them in a forest, engaging them with grenades and small-arms fire. The Turkish forces suffered heavy casualties but managed to recover and engage back, and had killed seven Kurdish militants.

The grenades thrown had started a forest fire, which had spread and resulting in the deaths of the Turkish troops, burning them alive.

== Aftermath ==
Recep Tayyip Erdoğan met with various military officials and the interior minister in Ankara in order to address the attack. Turkish forces were sent to hunt down the remaining insurgents, backed by aerial support.

== Reactions ==
- Recep Tayyip Erdoğan - “Turkey will succeed in overcoming the terror and the powers behind it without compromising democracy, justice and brotherhood.”
- Anders Fogh Rasmussen - "I express my heartfelt condolences to the families of those who were killed. NATO allies stand in full solidarity against the scourge of terrorism."
- Hillary Clinton - "We stand with Turkey in its fight against the PKK, a designated terrorist organization which has claimed tens of thousands of Turkish lives," she said in a statement. "We support Turkey in its fight against terror and we will continue to work with the Government of Turkey to combat terrorism in all its forms."
