= Çiğdemli, Silvan =

Village in Turkey

Çiğdemli
- Neighbourhood
- Location in Turkey
- Coordinates: 38°10′12″N 41°04′44″E
- Country: Turkey
- Province: Diyarbakır
- District: Silvan
- Population (2022): 156
- Time zone: UTC+3 (TRT)

Çiğdemli (Kurdish: Kurbeyt) is a neighbourhood in the municipality and district of Silvan, Diyarbakır Province in Turkey. It is populated by Kurds and had population of 156 in 2022.
