= Yukarıveysi, Silvan =

Village in Turkey

Yukarıveysi
- Neighbourhood
- Location in Turkey
- Coordinates: 38°06′34″N 40°56′56″E
- Country: Turkey
- Province: Diyarbakır
- District: Silvan
- Population (2022): 460
- Time zone: UTC+3 (TRT)

Yukarıveysi (Kurdish: Weysikanê jorîn) is a neighbourhood in the municipality and district of Silvan, Diyarbakır Province in Turkey. It is populated by Kurds and had a population of 460 in 2022.
