= Bahçe, Silvan =

Village in Turkey

Bahçe
- Neighbourhood
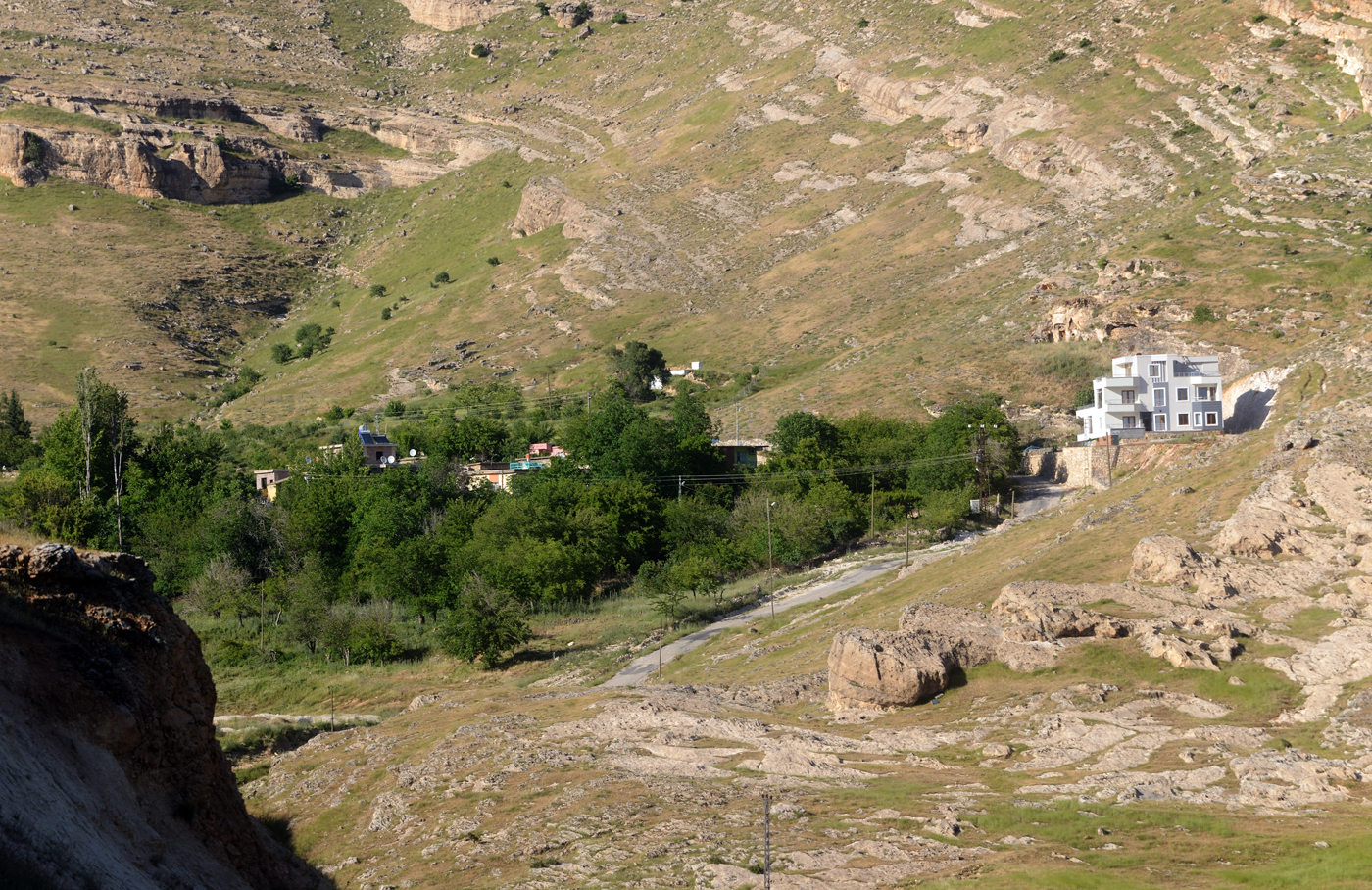

- Location within Turkey
- Coordinates: 38.1320°N 41.0997°E
- Country: Turkey
- Province: Diyarbakır
- District: Silvan
- Population (2022): 84
- Time zone: UTC+3 (TRT)

Bahçe (Kurdish: Baxça) is a neighbourhood in the municipality and district of Silvan, Diyarbakır Province in Turkey. It is populated by Kurds and had a population of 84 in 2022.
