= Sarıbuğday, Silvan =

Village in Turkey

Sarıbuğday
- Neighbourhood
- Location in Turkey
- Coordinates: 38°08′39″N 40°46′41″E
- Country: Turkey
- Province: Diyarbakır
- District: Silvan
- Population (2022): 829
- Time zone: UTC+3 (TRT)

Sarıbuğday (Kurdish: Pîrema) is a neighbourhood in the municipality and district of Silvan, Diyarbakır Province in Turkey. It is populated by Kurds and had a population of 829 in 2022.
