= Sağlık, Silvan =

Village in Turkey

Sağlık
- Neighbourhood
- Location in Turkey
- Coordinates: 38°06′06″N 40°53′33″E
- Country: Turkey
- Province: Diyarbakır
- District: Silvan
- Population (2022): 264
- Time zone: UTC+3 (TRT)

Sağlık (Kurdish: Siloq) is a neighbourhood in the municipality and district of Silvan, Diyarbakır Province in Turkey. It is populated by Kurds and had a population of 264 in 2022.
