= Kıraçtepe, Silvan =

Village in Turkey

Kıraçtepe
- Neighbourhood
- Location in Turkey
- Coordinates: 38°02′29″N 41°07′08″E
- Country: Turkey
- Province: Diyarbakır
- District: Silvan
- Population (2022): 232
- Time zone: UTC+3 (TRT)

Kıraçtepe (Kurdish: Gundikê Birahîm) is a neighbourhood in the municipality and district of Silvan, Diyarbakır Province in Turkey. It is populated by Kurds and had a population of 232 in 2022.
