= Başıbüyük, Silvan =

Village in Turkey

Başıbüyük
- Neighbourhood
- Location in Turkey
- Coordinates: 38.1437°N 40.8830°E
- Country: Turkey
- Province: Diyarbakır
- District: Silvan
- Population (2022): 239
- Time zone: UTC+3 (TRT)

Başıbüyük (Kurdish: Başbûk) is a neighbourhood in the municipality and district of Silvan, Diyarbakır Province in Turkey. The village is populated by Kurds and had a population of 239 in 2022.
