= Nohuttepe, Silvan =

Village in Turkey

Nohuttepe
- Neighbourhood
- Location in Turkey
- Coordinates: 38°05′55″N 41°06′47″E
- Country: Turkey
- Province: Diyarbakır
- District: Silvan
- Population (2022): 117
- Time zone: UTC+3 (TRT)

Nohuttepe (Kurdish: Hesendelya) is a neighbourhood in the municipality and district of Silvan, Diyarbakır Province in Turkey. It is populated by Kurds and had a population of 117 in 2022.
