= Malabadi, Silvan =

Village in Turkey

Malabadi
- Neighbourhood
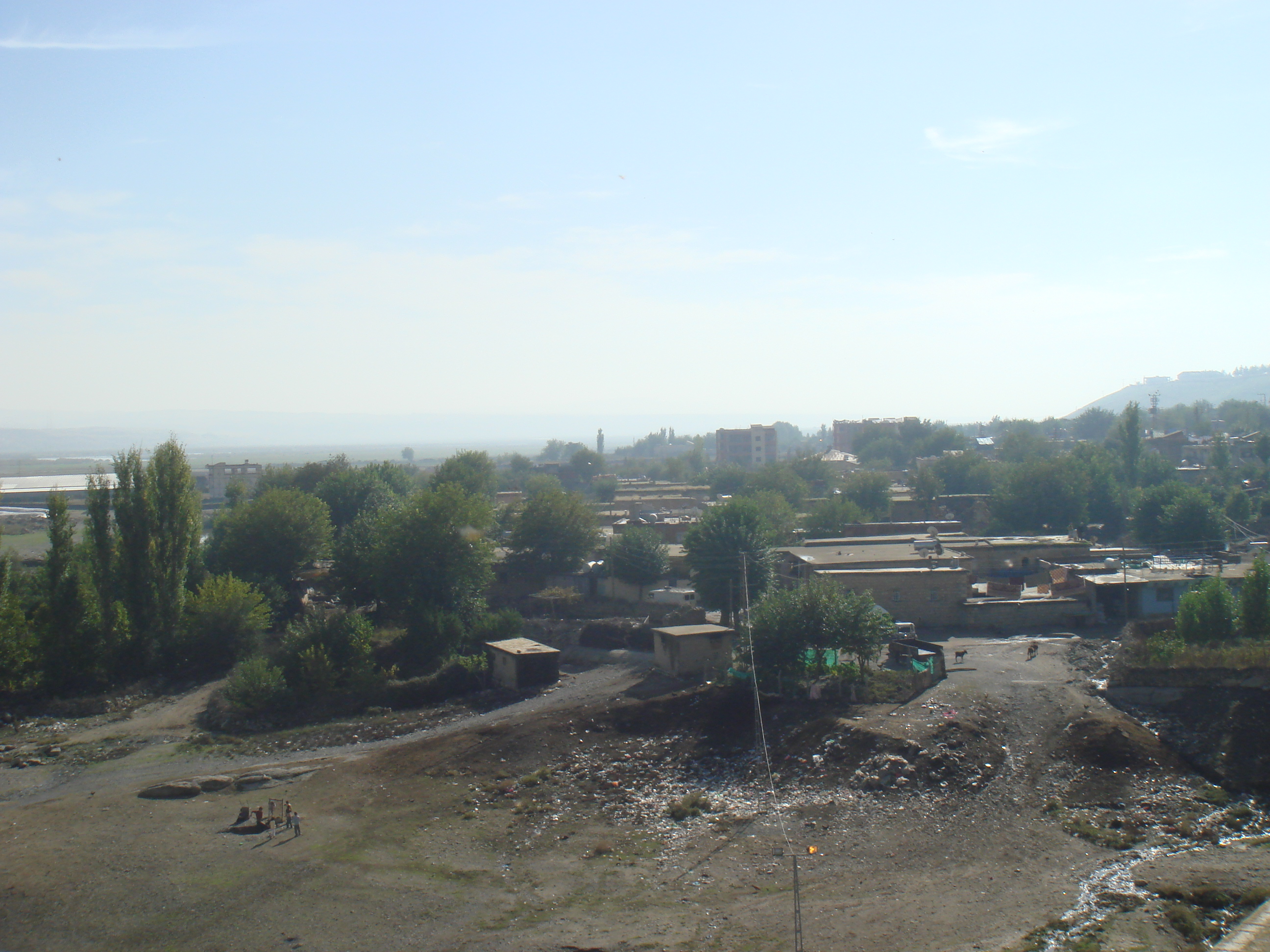

- Location within Turkey
- Coordinates: 38°09′02″N 41°12′11″E
- Country: Turkey
- Province: Diyarbakır
- District: Silvan
- Population (2022): 1,481
- Time zone: UTC+3 (TRT)

Malabadi, formerly Çatakköprü, (Kurdish: Malabadê) is a neighbourhood in the municipality and district of Silvan, Diyarbakır Province in Turkey. It is populated by Kurds and had a population of 1,481 in 2022.

== See also ==
Malabadi Bridge
