= Dolapdere, Silvan =

Village in Turkey

Dolapdere
- Neighbourhood
- Location in Turkey
- Coordinates: 38°18′29″N 40°53′29″E
- Country: Turkey
- Province: Diyarbakır
- District: Silvan
- Population (2022): 182
- Time zone: UTC+3 (TRT)

Dolapdere (Kurdish: Şêlima) is a neighbourhood in the municipality and district of Silvan, Diyarbakır Province in Turkey. It is populated by Kurds and had a population of 182 in 2022.
