= Beypınar, Silvan =

Village in Turkey

Beypınar
- Neighbourhood
- Location in Turkey
- Coordinates: 38.0737°N 40.9135°E
- Country: Turkey
- Province: Diyarbakır
- District: Silvan
- Population (2022): 840
- Time zone: UTC+3 (TRT)

Beypınar (Kurdish: Fêra) is a neighbourhood in the municipality and district of Silvan, Diyarbakır Province in Turkey. It is populated by Kurds and had population of 840 in 2022.
