= Kumgölü, Silvan =

Village in Turkey

Kumgölü
- Neighbourhood
- Location in Turkey
- Coordinates: 38°14′27″N 41°07′17″E
- Country: Turkey
- Province: Diyarbakır
- District: Silvan
- Population (2022): 636
- Time zone: UTC+3 (TRT)

Kumgölü (Kurdish: Emerka) is a neighbourhood in the municipality and district of Silvan, Diyarbakır Province in Turkey. It is populated by Kurds of the Badikan tribe and had a population of 636 in 2023.
