= Kutlualan, Silvan =

Village in Turkey

Kutlualan
- Neighbourhood
- Location in Turkey
- Coordinates: 38°02′55″N 40°42′30″E
- Country: Turkey
- Province: Diyarbakır
- District: Silvan
- Population (2022): 481
- Time zone: UTC+3 (TRT)

Kutlualan (Kurdish: Şêx Dewdada) (Note: Also known as Gheh-Davoud, Şehdamdan, or Şeyhdavudan.) is a neighbourhood in the municipality and district of Silvan, Diyarbakır Province in Turkey. It is populated by Kurds and had a population of 481 in 2022.

== History ==
Şêx Dewdada (today called Kutlualan) was historically inhabited by Syriac Orthodox Christians. In 1914, it was populated by 300 Syriacs, according to the list presented to the Paris Peace Conference by the Assyro-Chaldean delegation.

== Bibliography ==
- Gaunt, David (2006). Massacres, Resistance, Protectors: Muslim-Christian Relations in Eastern Anatolia during World War I. Gorgias Press.
- Jongerden, Joost; Verheij, Jelle, eds. (2012). Social Relations in Ottoman Diyarbekir, 1870-1915. Brill.
- Tîgrîs, Amed; Çakar, Yıldız (2012). Amed : erdnîgarî, dîrok, çand (in Kurdish).
