= Kazandağı, Silvan =

Village in Turkey

Kazandağı
- Neighbourhood
- Location in Turkey
- Coordinates: 38°11′04″N 41°07′05″E
- Country: Turkey
- Province: Diyarbakır
- District: Silvan
- Population (2022): 646
- Time zone: UTC+3 (TRT)

Kazandağı (Kurdish: Mala Elîkê) is a neighbourhood in the municipality and district of Silvan, Diyarbakır Province in Turkey. It is populated by Kurds and had a population of 646 in 2022.
