= Şanlı, Silvan =

Village in Turkey

Şanlı
- Neighbourhood
- Location within Turkey
- Country: Turkey
- Province: Diyarbakır
- District: Silvan
- Population (2022): 391
- Time zone: UTC+3 (TRT)

Şanlı (Kurdish: Küreyşa) is a neighbourhood in the municipality and district of Silvan, Diyarbakır Province in Turkey. Its population is 391 (2022).
