= Bayrambaşı, Silvan =

Village in Turkey

Bayrambaşı
- Neighbourhood
- Location in Turkey
- Coordinates: 38°15′45″N 40°57′41″E
- Country: Turkey
- Province: Diyarbakır
- District: Silvan
- Population (2022): 1,997
- Time zone: UTC+3 (TRT)

Bayrambaşı (Kurdish: Sêdeqnê) is a neighbourhood of the municipality and district of Silvan, Diyarbakır Province, Turkey. It is populated by Kurds and had population of 1,997 in 2022.

Before the 2013 reorganisation, it was a town (belde).
