= Kayadere, Silvan =

Village in Turkey

Kayadere
- Neighbourhood
- Location in Turkey
- Coordinates: 38.1918°N 41.0351°E
- Country: Turkey
- Province: Diyarbakır
- District: Silvan
- Population (2022): 204
- Time zone: UTC+3 (TRT)

Kayadere (Kurdish: Ferhend) is a neighbourhood in the municipality and district of Silvan, Diyarbakır Province in Turkey. It is populated by Kurds and had a population of 204 in 2022.
