= Altınkum, Silvan =

Village in Turkey

Altınkum
- Neighbourhood
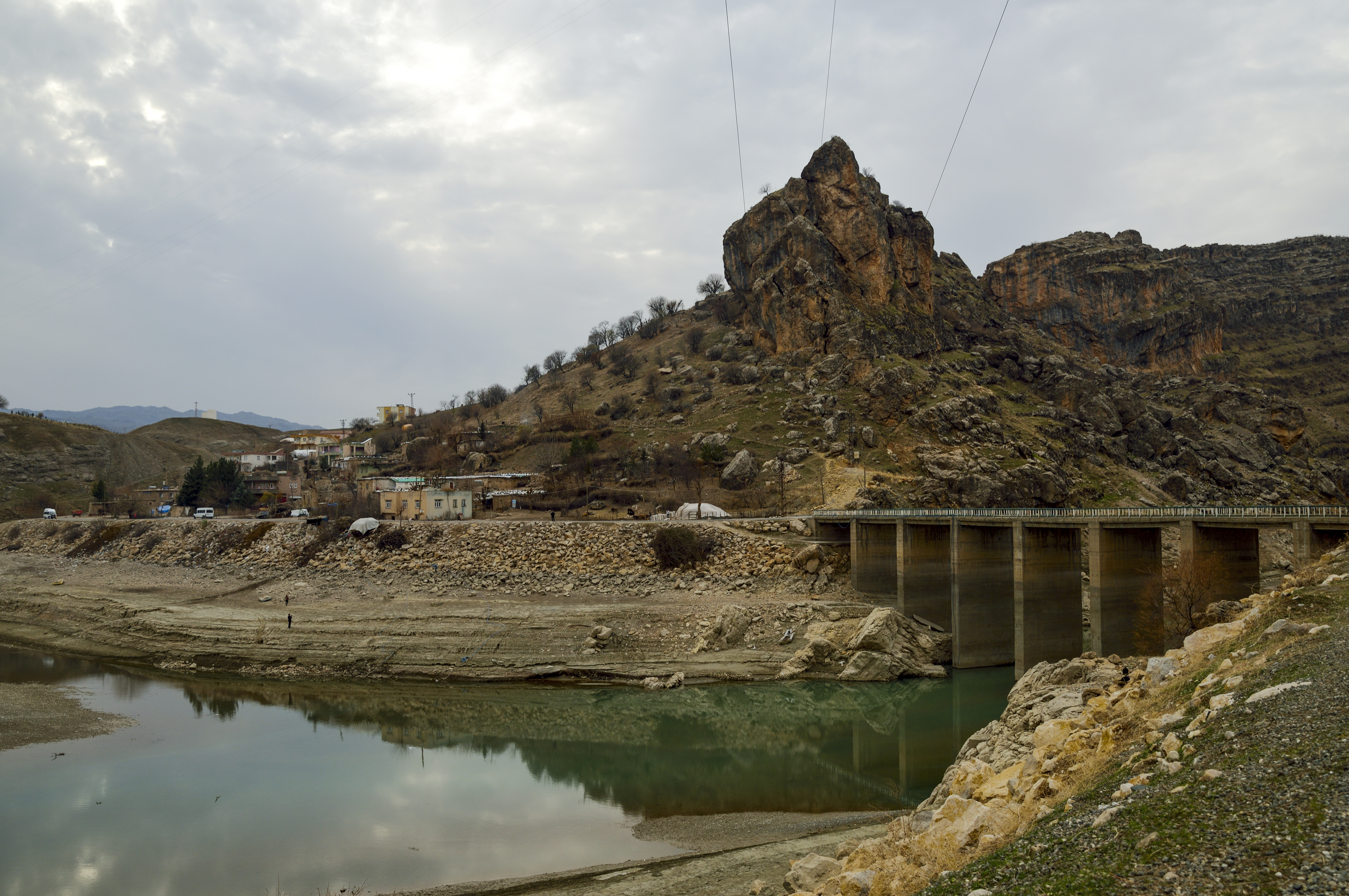

- Location within Turkey
- Coordinates: 38.2615°N 41.0593°E
- Country: Turkey
- Province: Diyarbakır
- District: Silvan
- Population (2022): 250
- Time zone: UTC+3 (TRT)

Altınkum (Kurdish: Başqê) is a neighbourhood in the municipality and district of Silvan, Diyarbakır Province in Turkey. It is populated by Kurds and had population of 250 in 2022.
