= Karamus, Silvan =

Village in Turkey

Karamus
- Neighbourhood
- Location in Turkey
- Coordinates: 37°59′34″N 41°03′47″E
- Country: Turkey
- Province: Diyarbakır
- District: Silvan
- Population (2022): 700
- Time zone: UTC+3 (TRT)

Karamus (Kurdish: Qeremûs) is a neighbourhood in the municipality and district of Silvan, Diyarbakır Province in Turkey. It is populated by Kurds and had a population of 700 in 2022.
