= Otluk, Silvan =

Village in Turkey

Otluk
- Neighbourhood
- Location in Turkey
- Coordinates: 38°10′50″N 40°54′08″E
- Country: Turkey
- Province: Diyarbakır
- District: Silvan
- Population (2022): 325
- Time zone: UTC+3 (TRT)

Otluk (Kurdish: Heşter) is a neighbourhood in the municipality and district of Silvan, Diyarbakır Province in Turkey. It is populated by Kurds and had a population of 325 in 2022.
