= Üçbasamak, Silvan =

Village in Turkey

Üçbasamak
- Neighbourhood
- Location in Turkey
- Coordinates: 38°12′15″N 40°55′30″E
- Country: Turkey
- Province: Diyarbakır
- District: Silvan
- Population (2022): 487
- Time zone: UTC+3 (TRT)

Üçbasamak (Kurdish: Zinzin) is a neighbourhood in the municipality and district of Silvan, Diyarbakır Province in Turkey.

== Demograhics ==
It is populated by Kurds and had a population of 487 in 2022.
