= Ormandışı, Silvan =

Village in Turkey

Ormandışı
- Neighbourhood
- Location in Turkey
- Coordinates: 38°14′30″N 41°01′22″E
- Country: Turkey
- Province: Diyarbakır
- District: Silvan
- Population (2022): 448
- Time zone: UTC+3 (TRT)

Ormandışı (Kurdish: Çiçika) is a neighbourhood in the municipality and district of Silvan, Diyarbakır Province in Turkey. It is populated by Kurds and had a population of 448 in 2022.
