= İncesu, Silvan =

Village in Turkey

İncesu
- Neighbourhood
- Location in Turkey
- Coordinates: 38.1187°N 41.0792°E
- Country: Turkey
- Province: Diyarbakır
- District: Silvan
- Population (2022): 336
- Time zone: UTC+3 (TRT)

İncesu (Kurdish: Tilmîn) is a neighbourhood in the municipality and district of Silvan, Diyarbakır Province in Turkey. It is populated by Kurds and had a population of 336 in 2022.
