= Yenidoğan, Silvan =

Village in Turkey

Yenidoğan
- Neighbourhood
- Location in Turkey
- Coordinates: 38.0706°N 41.1777°E
- Country: Turkey
- Province: Diyarbakır
- District: Silvan
- Population (2022): 194
- Time zone: UTC+3 (TRT)

Yenidoğan (Kurdish: Sahbe) is a neighbourhood in the municipality and district of Silvan, Diyarbakır Province in Turkey. It is populated by Kurds and had a population of 194 in 2022.
