= Görmez, Silvan =

Village in Turkey

Görmez
- Neighbourhood
- Location in Turkey
- Coordinates: 38°05′16″N 40°52′16″E
- Country: Turkey
- Province: Diyarbakır
- District: Silvan
- Population (2022): 271
- Time zone: UTC+3 (TRT)

Görmez (Kurdish: Gormez) (Note: Also known as Germo.) is a neighbourhood in the municipality and district of Silvan, Diyarbakır Province in Turkey. It is populated by Kurds and had a population of 271 in 2022.

== History ==
Germo (today called Görmez) was historically inhabited by Syriac Orthodox Christians. In 1914, there were 50 Syriacs, according to the list presented to the Paris Peace Conference by the Assyro-Chaldean delegation.

== Bibliography ==
- Gaunt, David (2006). Massacres, Resistance, Protectors: Muslim-Christian Relations in Eastern Anatolia during World War I. Gorgias Press.
- Jongerden, Joost; Verheij, Jelle, eds. (2012). Social Relations in Ottoman Diyarbekir, 1870-1915. Brill.
- Tîgrîs, Amed; Çakar, Yıldız (2012). Amed : erdnîgarî, dîrok, çand (in Kurdish).
