= Karahacı, Silvan =

Village in Turkey

Karahacı
- Neighbourhood
- Location in Turkey
- Coordinates: 38°11′13″N 40°52′15″E
- Country: Turkey
- Province: Diyarbakır
- District: Silvan
- Population (2022): 725
- Time zone: UTC+3 (TRT)

Karahacı (Kurdish: Hecîreş) is a neighbourhood in the municipality and district of Silvan, Diyarbakır Province in Turkey. It is populated by Kurds and had population of 725 in 2022.
