= Erikyazı, Silvan =

Village in Turkey

Erikyazı
- Neighbourhood
- Location in Turkey
- Coordinates: 38°04′07″N 40°58′13″E
- Country: Turkey
- Province: Diyarbakır
- District: Silvan
- Population (2022): 357
- Time zone: UTC+3 (TRT)

Erikyazı (Kurdish: Qewşan) is a neighbourhood in the municipality and district of Silvan, Diyarbakır Province in Turkey. It is populated by Kurds and had a population of 357 in 2022.
