= Görentepe, Silvan =

Village in Turkey

Görentepe
- Neighbourhood
- Location in Turkey
- Coordinates: 38.2295°N 40.9488°E
- Country: Turkey
- Province: Diyarbakır
- District: Silvan
- Population (2022): 205
- Time zone: UTC+3 (TRT)

Görentepe (Kurdish: Helda) is a neighbourhood in the municipality and district of Silvan, Diyarbakır Province in Turkey. It is populated by Kurds and had a population of 205 in 2022.
