= Çiğil, Silvan =

Village in Turkey

Çiğil
- Neighbourhood
- Location in Turkey
- Coordinates: 38°00′45″N 41°08′31″E
- Country: Turkey
- Province: Diyarbakır
- District: Silvan
- Population (2022): 238
- Time zone: UTC+3 (TRT)

Çiğil (Kurdish: Pîleka) is a neighbourhood in the municipality and district of Silvan, Diyarbakır Province in Turkey. It is populated by Kurds and had a population of 238 in 2022.
