= Kasımlı, Silvan =

Village in Turkey

Kasımlı
- Neighbourhood
- Location within Turkey
- Country: Turkey
- Province: Diyarbakır
- District: Silvan
- Population (2022): 92
- Time zone: UTC+3 (TRT)

Kasımlı (Kurdish: Kasimî) is a neighbourhood in the municipality and district of Silvan, Diyarbakır Province in Turkey. Its population is 92 (2022).
