= Gürpınar, Silvan =

Village in Turkey

Gürpınar
- Neighbourhood
- Location in Turkey
- Coordinates: 38°12′04″N 41°05′06″E
- Country: Turkey
- Province: Diyarbakır
- District: Silvan
- Population (2022): 825
- Time zone: UTC+3 (TRT)

Gürpınar (Kurdish: Bêzwan) is a neighbourhood in the municipality and district of Silvan, Diyarbakır Province in Turkey. It is populated by Kurds and had a population of 825 in 2022.
