= Duru, Silvan =

Village in Turkey

Duru
- Neighbourhood
- Location in Turkey
- Coordinates: 38°01′01″N 40°58′03″E
- Country: Turkey
- Province: Diyarbakır
- District: Silvan
- Population (2022): 34
- Time zone: UTC+3 (TRT)

Duru (Kurdish: Garisî; Syriac: Kūrīšā) is a neighbourhood in the municipality and district of Silvan, Diyarbakır Province in Turkey. It is populated by Kurds and had a population of 34 in 2022.

== History ==
Kūrīšā (today called Duru) was historically inhabited by Syriac Orthodox Christians. In the Syriac Orthodox patriarchal register of dues of 1870, it was recorded that the village had thirteen households, who paid forty-seven dues, and did not have a church or a priest.

== Bibliography ==
- Bcheiry, Iskandar (2009). The Syriac Orthodox Patriarchal Register of Dues of 1870: An Unpublished Historical Document from the Late Ottoman Period. Gorgias Press.
- Tîgrîs, Amed; Çakar, Yıldız (2012). Amed : erdnîgarî, dîrok, çand (in Kurdish).
