= Umurköy, Silvan =

Village in Turkey

Umurköy
- Neighbourhood
- Location in Turkey
- Coordinates: 38°06′35″N 40°58′21″E
- Country: Turkey
- Province: Diyarbakır
- District: Silvan
- Population (2022): 271
- Time zone: UTC+3 (TRT)

Umurköy (Kurdish: Korît) is a neighborhood in the municipality and district of Silvan, Diyarbakır Province in Turkey. It is populated by Kurds and had a population of 271 in 2022.
