= Karacalar, Silvan =

Village in Turkey

Karacalar
- Neighbourhood
- Location in Turkey
- Coordinates: 38°02′53″N 40°58′19″E
- Country: Turkey
- Province: Diyarbakır
- District: Silvan
- Population (2022): 330
- Time zone: UTC+3 (TRT)

Karacalar (Kurdish: Hacîca) is a neighbourhood in the municipality and district of Silvan, Diyarbakır Province in Turkey. It is populated by Kurds and had a population of 330 in 2022.
