= Çobantepe, Silvan =

Village in Turkey

Çobantepe
- Neighbourhood
- Location in Turkey
- Coordinates: 38°00′59″N 40°34′34″E
- Country: Turkey
- Province: Diyarbakır
- District: Silvan
- Population (2022): 57
- Time zone: UTC+3 (TRT)

Çobantepe (Kurdish: Talî) is a neighbourhood in the municipality and district of Silvan, Diyarbakır Province in Turkey. It is populated by Kurds and had a population of 57 in 2022.
