= Başdeğirmen, Silvan =

Village in Turkey

Başdeğirmen
- Neighbourhood
- Location in Turkey
- Coordinates: 38.1328°N 41.1924°E
- Country: Turkey
- Province: Diyarbakır
- District: Silvan
- Population (2022): 563
- Time zone: UTC+3 (TRT)

Başdeğirmen (Kurdish: Kepo) is a neighbourhood in the municipality and district of Silvan, Diyarbakır Province in Turkey. It is populated by Kurds and had a population of 563 in 2022.
