= Yeşilköy, Silvan =

Village in Turkey

Yeşilköy
- Neighbourhood
- Location within Turkey
- Coordinates: 38°06′40″N 41°09′01″E
- Country: Turkey
- Province: Diyarbakır
- District: Silvan
- Population (2022): 407
- Time zone: UTC+3 (TRT)

Yeşilköy (Kurdish: Dırıka duruni, formerly: Dutveren) is a neighbourhood in the municipality and district of Silvan, Diyarbakır Province in Turkey. It is populated by Kurds and had a population of 407 in 2022.
