= Kumluk, Silvan =

Village in Turkey

Kumluk
- Neighbourhood
- Location in Turkey
- Coordinates: 38°06′12″N 40°40′51″E
- Country: Turkey
- Province: Diyarbakır
- District: Silvan
- Population (2022): 354
- Time zone: UTC+3 (TRT)

Kumluk (Kurdish: Qazoxa) is a neighbourhood in the municipality and district of Silvan, Diyarbakır Province in Turkey. It is populated by Kurds and had a population of 354 in 2022.
