= Yolaç, Silvan =

Village in Turkey

Yolaç
- Neighbourhood
- Location in Turkey
- Coordinates: 38°08′04″N 40°57′21″E
- Country: Turkey
- Province: Diyarbakır
- District: Silvan
- Population (2022): 140
- Time zone: UTC+3 (TRT)

Yolaç (Kurdish: Sûsa) is a neighbourhood in the municipality and district of Silvan, Diyarbakır Province in Turkey. It is populated by Kurds and had a population of 140 in 2023.

On 26 June 1992, the Kurdistan Workers' Party attacked the village killing ten men during its conflict with Hezbollah.
