= Gündüz, Silvan =

Village in Turkey

Gündüz
- Neighbourhood
- Location in Turkey
- Coordinates: 38°10′29″N 40°54′54″E
- Country: Turkey
- Province: Diyarbakır
- District: Silvan
- Population (2022): 386
- Time zone: UTC+3 (TRT)

Gündüz (also: Gündüzköy, Kurdish: Bilbil) is a neighbourhood in the municipality and district of Silvan, Diyarbakır Province in Turkey. It is populated by Kurds and had a population of 386 in 2022.
