= Gündüz =

Gündüz or Gunduz is a masculine given name and a surname. Notable people with the name include:

== Given name ==
- Gündüz Aktan (1941–2008), Turkish diplomat and politician
- Gunduz Caginalp (died 2021), American mathematician of Turkish descent
- Gündüz Gürol Azer (born 1980), Turkish football player
- Gündüz Kılıç (1919–1980), Turkish football player and coach
- Gündüz Tekin Onay (1942–2008), Turkish footballer and coach
- Masatoshi Gündüz Ikeda (1926–2003), Turkish mathematician of Japanese ancestry
- Gündüz Alp, brother or grandfather of Osman I

== Surname ==
- Aka Gündüz (1886–1958), Turkish poet, composer and politician
- Asım Gündüz (1880–1970), Turkish military officer
- Asım Can Gündüz (1955–2016), Turkish rock and blues guitarist
- Atakan Gündüz (born 2001), Turkish football player
- Ömer Gündüz (born 2001), Dutch football player
- Samet Gunduz (born 1987), Swiss football player
- Seyhan Gündüz (born 1980), Turkish football player
- Şinasi Gündüz (born 1960), Turkish historian of religion
- Teoman Gündüz (born 2004), Turkish footballer
