= Eşme, Silvan =

Village in Turkey

Eşme
- Neighbourhood
- Location in Turkey
- Coordinates: 38°02′02″N 40°53′41″E
- Country: Turkey
- Province: Diyarbakır
- District: Silvan
- Population (2022): 527
- Time zone: UTC+3 (TRT)

Eşme (Kurdish: Salika) is a neighbourhood in the municipality and district of Silvan, Diyarbakır Province in Turkey. It is populated by Kurds and had a population of 527 in 2022.
