= Akyol, Silvan =

Village in Turkey

Akyol
- Neighbourhood
- Location in Turkey
- Coordinates: 38.1233°N 40.9242°E
- Country: Turkey
- Province: Diyarbakır
- District: Silvan
- Population (2022): 141
- Time zone: UTC+3 (TRT)

Akyol (Kurdish: Zêrê) is a neighbourhood in the municipality and district of Silvan, Diyarbakır Province in Turkey. It is populated by Kurds and had population of 141 in 2022.
