= Silvan, Diyarbakır =

City in Diyarbakir, Turkey

Silvan
- District and municipality
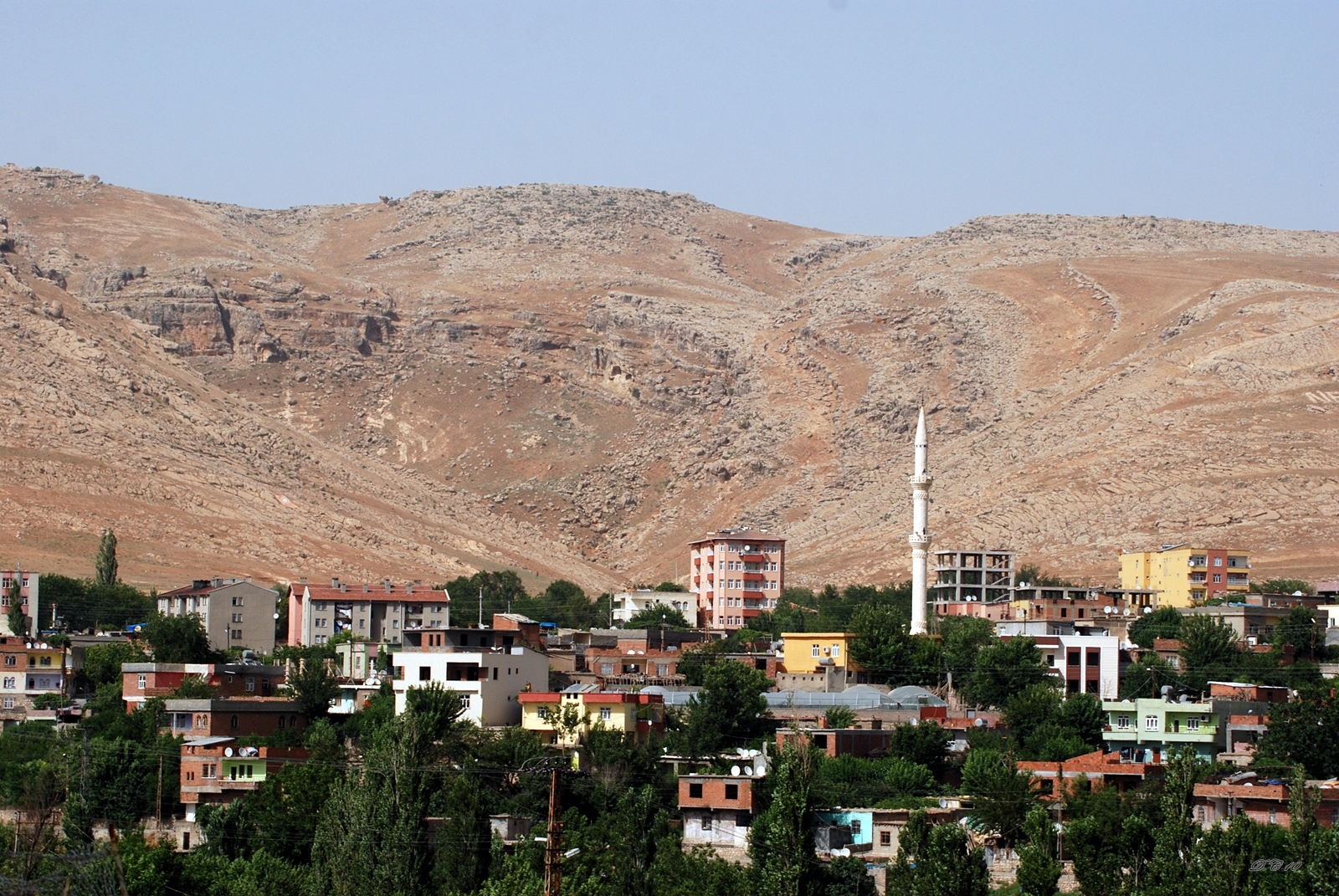

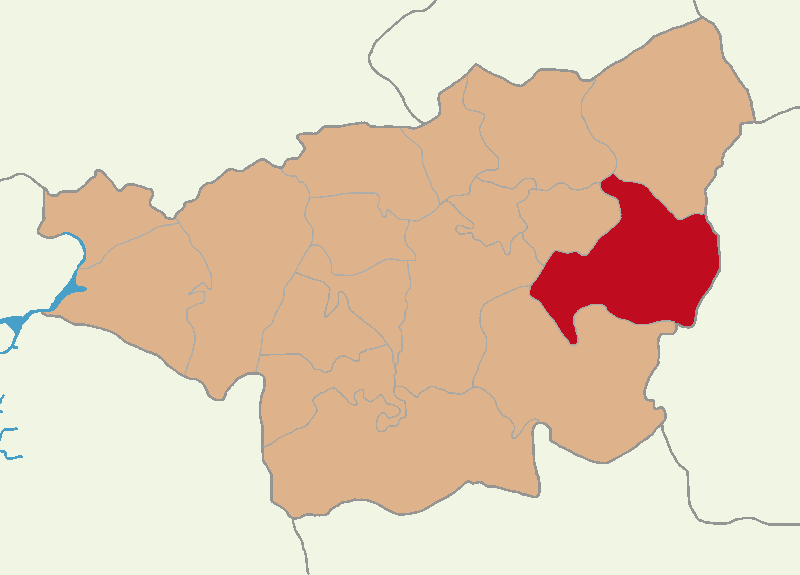
- Map showing Silvan District in Diyarbakır Province

- Location within Turkey
- Coordinates: 38°08′32″N 41°00′05″E
- Country: Turkey
- Province: Diyarbakır
- Area: 1,252 km^{2} (483 sq mi)
- Elevation: 810 m (2,660 ft)
- Population (2022): 86,161
  - Density: 68.82/km^{2} (178.2/sq mi)
- Time zone: UTC+3 (TRT)
- Postal code: 21640
- Area code: 0412
- Website: www.silvan.bel.tr

Silvan (Kurdish: Farqîn; Ottoman Turkish: ميا فارقين, romanized: Meyafarikîn, Armenian: Սիլվան, romanized: Silvan) is a municipality and district of Diyarbakır Province, Turkey. Its area is 1,252 km^{2}, and its population is 86,161 (2022). It is populated by Kurds.

== History ==
Silvan has been identified by several scholars as one of two possible locations (the other being Arzan) of Tigranocerta, the ancient capital of the Kingdom of Armenia, which was built by Tigranes the Great (ruling 95–55 BCE) and named in his honor.

=== Roman era ===
In 69 BCE, the army of Republican Rome defeated Tigranes' troops at the battle of Tigranocerta. The city lost its importance as a thriving center for trade and Hellenism in the following decades. In 387 AD, with the Peace of Acilisene, Tigranakert was made part of the Byzantine Empire.

Around 400 CE, the city's bishop, Maruthas of Martyropolis, brought a large number of relics of Christian martyrs back from the Sasanian Empire. For this reason, Tigranakert was renamed Martyropolis (Μαρτυρούπολις), 'city of the martyrs'. Following the reforms of Justinian I (rule 527–565), the city was made the capital of the province of Sophene. The city was inconclusively besieged by the Persians in the last phase of the Iberian War.

The city suffered heavily in the Battle of Martyropolis in 588 AD, but soon prospered again.

=== Islamic era ===
It was known as Mayyāfāriqīn after the early Muslim conquests in the 7th century. It was then controlled by the first three caliphates until it came under the control of the Hamdanids in 935, then the Buyids in 978, then it came under the Kurdish Marwanids and became the capital of their dynasty until the end of the 11th century. The city and the entire province of Diyarbakir were taken in 1085 by the Seljuk Turks under Malik-Shah I.

During the following years, the city changed hands several times due to rivalries between Seljuk clans and local rulers. In 1118, the Artukids took the city. They resisted the attacks of Zengid ruler Imad al-Din Zengi for many years. The Artukid Husam al-Din Timurtash built the Malabadi Bridge near Meiafarakin, one of the wonders of the time by its dimensions. The dynasty remained in place but preferred to reside in Mardin, leaving a governor to preside over Meiafarakin.

In early 1260, the city, defended by its last Ayyubid ruler Al-Kamil Muhammad, suffered the Siege of Mayyāfāriqīn, and its population then massacred by the Mongol army led by Hulagu Khan, with the help of his Georgian and Armenian allies. The Artukids eventually disappeared in 1408 under the attacks of the Qara Qoyunlu.

=== Ottoman Empire ===
In 1896, reports by the British Vice Consul Hallward indicate that many villages were destroyed during the Armenian massacres in 1895. Hallward was engaged in the rebuilding of about 35 villages.

=== 21st century ===
An ambush killing 13 Turkish soldiers occurred in the forests of Silvan by Kurdistan Workers' Party separatists, who also lost seven killed in action.

Silvan was also the site of serious clashes between Turkish government forces and Kurdish Kurdistan Workers Party (PKK) separatists in August 2015 during the wider Operation Martyr Yalçın.

Naşide Toprak from the Peoples' Democratic Party (HDP) was elected Mayor of Silvan in the local elections in March 2019. She was dismissed in March 2020, and Mehmet Uslu has been appointed as a trustee instead of her.

==== Archaeology ====
Archaeologists headed by professor Ahmet Tanyıldız, the vice-rector of Dicle University, announced in 2021 that they had discovered the grave of the Seljuk Sultan of Rum Kilij Arslan I, who fought against the Crusader forces. They also discovered his daughter Saide Hatun's burial site during nine days of work. Researchers dug two meters deep across a 35-square-meter area and focused their works on two gravesites in Orta Çeşme Park.

== Demographics ==
The Armenian Patriarchate of Constantinople reported 13,824 Armenians living in the kaza of Silvan on the eve of World War I, all Kurdish-speaking. They had 28 churches, two monasteries, and 35 schools. The town itself had 2,500 Armenian Apostolic Christians and 1,500 other Christians: Chaldeans (500 according to Priest Joseph Tfinkdji), Syriac Catholics, Syriac Orthodox, and Melchites. Assyrians call the city ܣܝܠܘܐܢ. Following the simultaneous Armenian genocide and Sayfo, the city's Christian population was largely exterminated and the remaining Christians fled to neighbouring countries.

Today, the municipality and district is populated by Kurds.

== Composition ==
There are 94 neighbourhoods in Silvan District:

- Akçayır
- Akçeltik
- Akdere
- Akyol
- Alibey
- Altınkum
- Arıköy
- Aşağıkaya
- Aşağıveysi
- Babakaya
- Bağdere
- Bağlar
- Bahçe
- Bahçelievler
- Başdeğirmen
- Başıbüyük
- Bayrambaşı
- Bellibahçe
- Bereketli
- Beypınar
- Boyunlu
- Çakıltaşı
- Çaldere
- Cami
- Çardak
- Çevriksu
- Çiftliçevre
- Çiğdemli
- Çiğil
- Çobantepe
- Dağcılar
- Darköprü
- Demirkuyu
- Dolapdere
- Doluçanak
- Duru
- Düzalan
- Erikyazı
- Eskiköy
- Eskiocak
- Eşme
- Feridun
- Gökçetevek
- Görentepe
- Görmez
- Güçlü
- Gündüz
- Gürpınar
- Güzderesi
- Heybelikonak
- İncesu
- Kale
- Karacalar
- Karahacı
- Karamus
- Kasımlı
- Kayadere
- Kazandağı
- Keklikdere
- Kıraçtepe
- Kızlal
- Konak
- Kumgölü
- Kumluk
- Kutlualan
- Malabadi
- Mescit
- Nohuttepe
- Onbaşılar
- Ormandışı
- Otluk
- Sağlık
- Şanlı
- Sarıbuğday
- Selahattin
- Sulak
- Sulubağ
- Susuz
- Taşpınar
- Tekel
- Tokluca
- Üçbasamak
- Umurköy
- Yenidoğan
- Yeniköy
- Yenişehir
- Yeşerdi
- Yeşilbahçe
- Yeşilköy
- Yolaç
- Yolarası
- Yukarıveysi
- Yüksek
- Yuva

== Notable people ==
- Ibn Nubata (d. 984), preacher
- Ibn al-Azraq al-Fariqi (1116–1176), chronicler
- Mehdi Zana (b. 1940), Former Kurdish politician
- Yekta Uzunoglu (b. 1953), doctor, writer, human rights fighter, translator and entrepreneur.
- Beytocan (b. 1955–2023), Kurdish singer and musician
- Mahsum Korkmaz (1956–1986), first commander of the Kurdistan Workers' Party (PKK)'s military forces.
- Leyla Zana (b. 1961), Kurdish politician
- Hakki Akdeniz (b. 1980), Kurdish philanthropist and restaurateur from New York City.

== Notable sites ==
- Malabadi Bridge

== See also ==
- Arrajan
- Silvan ambush
