= Raymond Kévorkian =

French Armenian historian (born 1953)

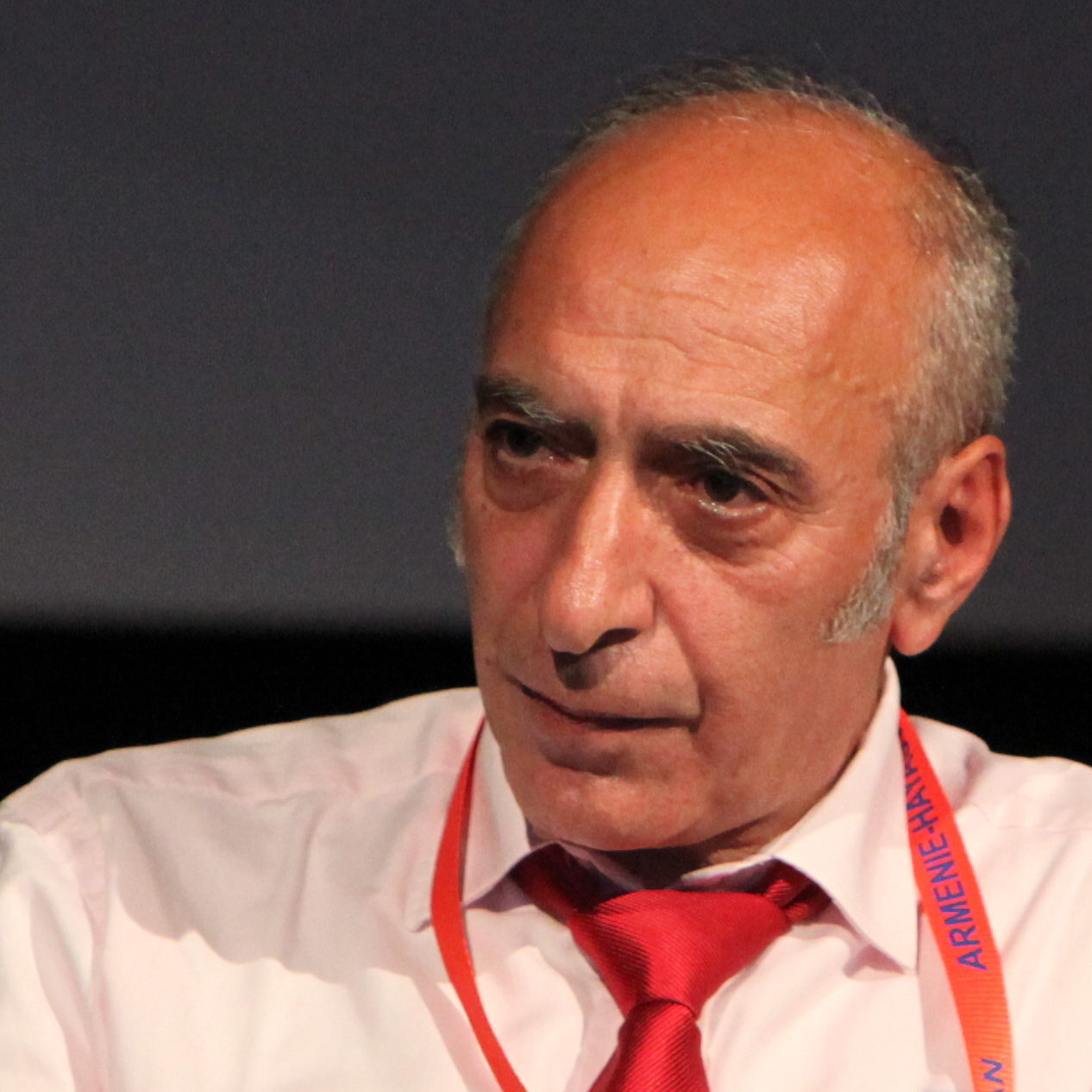
Raymond Kévorkian

Raymond Haroutiun Kévorkian (born February 22, 1953) is a French Armenian historian. He is a Foreign Member of Armenian National Academy of Sciences. Kevorkian has a PhD in history (1980), and is a professor.

== Biography ==
Kévorkian finished the University of Paris VIII: Vincennes - Saint-Denis, where he teaches and serves as Research director at the French Institute of Geopolitics (Institut Français de Géopolitique). From 1986 to 2012, Kévorkian was the director of Nubarian Library, Paris. He is the editor of d'Histoire arménienne contemporaine journal.

Kévorkian is the author of The Armenian Genocide: A Complete History, "an exhaustive and authoritative account of the origins, events, and consequences of the Armenian Genocide". It was originally published in French in 2006. The book is the first to make extensive use of the archives of the Nubarian Library.

In 2010, Kévorkian received the Presidential Award from Armenian President Serge Sarkisian in recognition of his contributions as a scholar. He is a member of Société de Géographie and a board member of International Association for Armenian Studies.

In 2015, he received the French Legion of Honor.

He played a key role curating the Mardigian Museum of Armenian Art and Culture, which reopened in 2022 in Jerusalem.

== Bibliography ==
- Le livre arménien à travers les âges, with Jean-Pierre Mahé, Catalogue de l'Exposition Marseille 1985 : Le livre arménien à travers les âges. 1985.
- Catalogue des « incunables » arméniens, 1511-1695 ou Chronique de l'imprimerie arménienne, with Jean-Pierre Mahé, Genève : P. Cramer. 1986.
- Les Imprimés arméniens des XVIe et XVIIe :: catalogue, Bibliothèque Nationale de France. 1987.
- Arménie : 3000 ans d'histoire, with Jean-Pierre Mahé, Maison armenienne de la jeunesse et de la culture. 1988.
- Les Imprimés arméniens : 1701-1850, Bibliothèque Nationale de France. 1989.
- Tapis et textiles arméniens, with Berdj Achdjian, Maison armenienne de la jeunesse et de la culture. 1991.
- Les Arméniens dans l'Empire ottoman à la veille du génocide, with Paul B. Paboudjian, Paris : Arhis. 1992.
- Arménie entre Orient et Occident : trois mille ans de civilisation, Bibliothèque Nationale de France. 1996.
- Manuscrits arméniens de la Bibliothèque nationale de France : catalogue, with Bernard Outtier, Bibliothèque Nationale de France. 1998.
- Parler les camps, Penser les génocides, Albin Michel. 1999
- Translation of Histoire de la médecine en Arménie : de l'Antiquité à nos jours », Union médicale arménienne de France. 1999.
- Ani, capitale de l'Arménie en l'an 1000, Paris-Musées. 2001
- Les Yeux Brûlants — Mémoire des Arméniens, with Antoine Agoudjian, Actes sud. 2006
- Le Génocide des Arméniens, Odile Jacob. 2006.
- Les Arméniens 1917-1939 — La quête d'un refuge, with Vahé Tachjian et Lévon Nordiguian, Presses de l Université Saint-Joseph (Lebanon). 2006
- Lumière de l'Arménie chrétienne, with Yvan Travert, éditions du patrimoine. 2006.
- Un siècle de l'Union Générale Arménienne de Bienfaisance, Vol. 1, 1906-1940, with Vahé Tachjian, Union Générale Arménienne de Bienfaisance. 2006.
- Une mémoire arménienne, with Yervant Der Goumcian, Direction du Patrimoine du Conseil général de l’Isère. 2007.
