= The Armenian Genocide: A Complete History =

2006 history book by Raymond Kévorkian

First edition (publ. Odile Jacob)

The Armenian Genocide: A Complete History is a 2006 book by Raymond Kévorkian that aims to give a comprehensive account of the Armenian genocide. The book was originally published in French as Le Génocide des Arméniens; it was published in English in 2011 by I.B. Tauris.
