= Batman Province =

Coordinates: 38°04′55″N 41°24′26″E

- Province
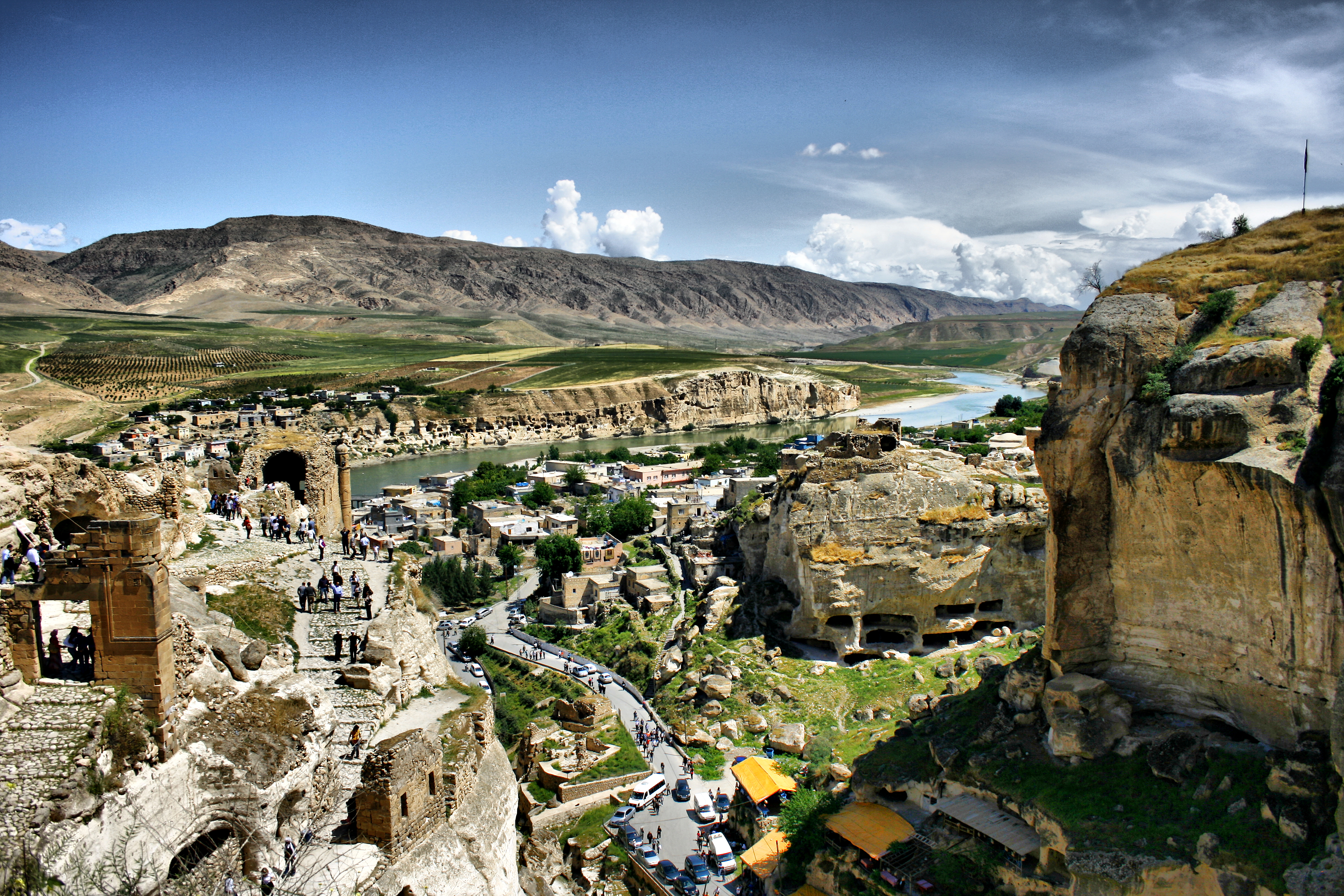
- A view of Hasankeyf

- Location of Batman Province in Turkey
- Country: Turkey
- Seat: Batman

Government
  - Governor: Ekrem Canalp
- Area: 4,477 km^{2} (1,729 sq mi)
- Population (2022): 634,491
  - Density: 141.7/km^{2} (367.1/sq mi)
- Time zone: UTC+3 (TRT)
- Area code: 0488
- Website: batman.gov.tr

Batman Province (Turkish: Batman ili; Kurdish: Parêzgeha Êlihê, transl. "Province of Êlih";") is a province in the Southeastern Anatolia Region of Turkey. It was created in May 1990 with Law No. 3647, incorporating districts from the eastern Siirt Province and the southern Mardin Province. The province has an area of 4,477 km^{2} (1,729 sq mi) and a population of 634,491 (2022). Its current governor is Ekrem Canalp.

The province is considered part of Turkish Kurdistan and has a Kurdish majority. It is an important center for Turkey's oil industry, which has driven rapid urbanization since the mid-20th century.

== History ==
=== Origins and industrialization ===
The history of the modern province is inextricably linked to the discovery of oil. Prior to the 1940s, the site of the provincial capital was a small village known as Iluh. The search for oil in the region began in 1935, culminating on 20 April 1940, when oil was discovered at a depth of 1048 meters at the Raman oil field. Commercial production began in 1947, followed by the construction of a refinery in 1948. By 1955, the facility's capacity was expanded to 330 tonnes per day. This rapid industrialization transformed the village of Iluh into the booming urban center of Batman, attracting significant migration and altering the region's social fabric.

=== Recent history ===
From July 1987 to October 1997, the region was included in the OHAL state of emergency zone, established to combat the Kurdistan Workers' Party (PKK) insurgency. During the 1990s, Batman became a focal point of the Kurdish–Turkish conflict. The province experienced a wave of political violence, including hundreds of killings by "unidentified gunmen" (faili meçhul), many of which were attributed to the conflict between the PKK and the Kurdish Hezbollah. Batman was widely reported to be a stronghold for the Kurdish Hezbollah, a Sunni Islamist organization that utilized the province for recruitment and training during this period.

== Geography ==
The province occupies an area of 4,477 km^{2} (1,729 sq mi). It lies in a mountainous area with an average elevation of 550 meters, containing thousands of caves. The tallest mountains are Sason Dağları (2500 m), Meleto (2967 m), Kuşaklı Dağı (1947 m), Avcı Dağı (2121 m), Meydanok Tepesi (2042 m), Kortepe (2082 m) and Raman Dağı (1288 m). Several rivers flow through the province, including the Tigris, Batman, Sason, and Garzan.

The 115 km (71 mi) long Batman River flows approximately north to south, forming a natural border between Batman Province and Diyarbakır Province. The Tigris flows west to east, merging with the Batman River before exiting the province.

=== Districts ===
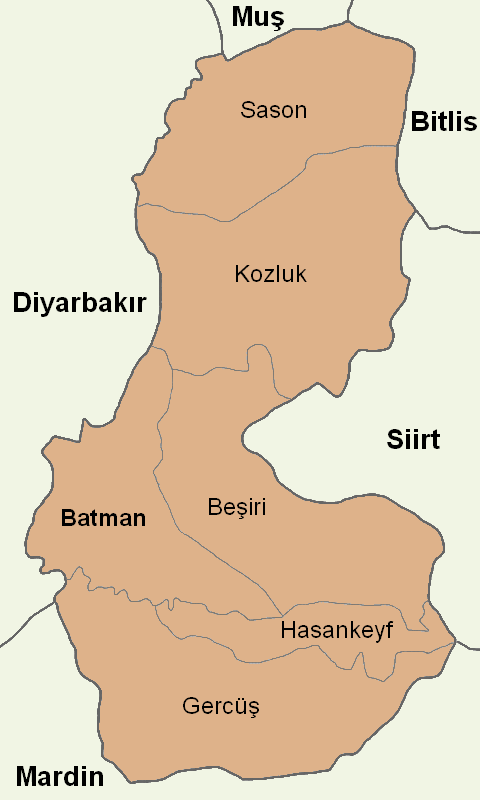

The province is divided into six districts:

- Batman
- Beşiri
- Gercüş
- Hasankeyf
- Kozluk
- Sason

There are 289 villages in the province.

== Demographics ==
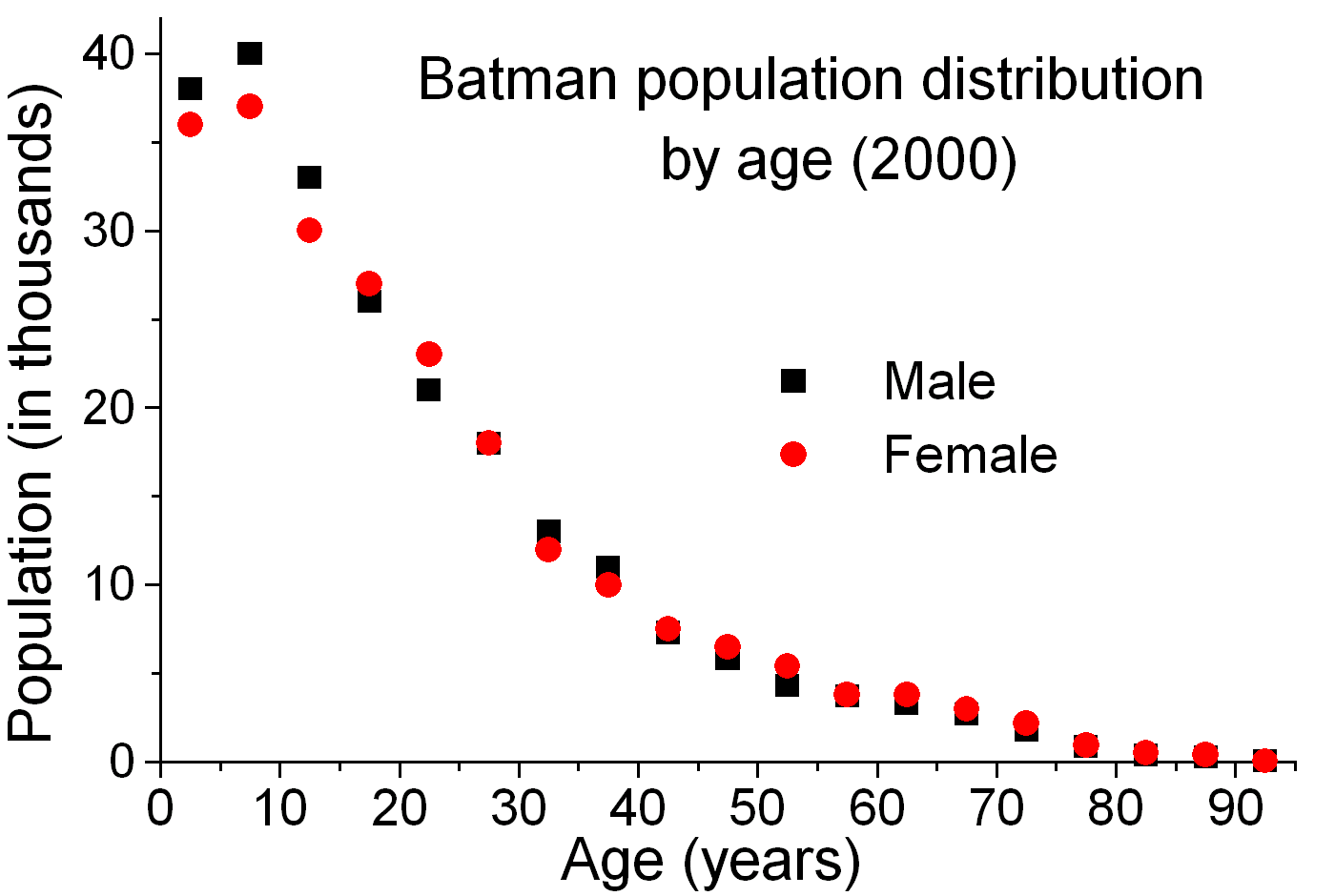
Population growth of Batman Province (1990–2020)

The population of the province has grown rapidly, purportedly due to the inflow of workforce to the capital driven by the oil industry. Between 1990 and 2000, its population rose at a rate of 5% per year. The total population was 634,491 in 2022.

Historical population
Year	Pop.	±% p.a.
1990	344,669	—
2000	456,734	+2.86%
2010	510,200	+1.11%
2020	620,278	+1.97%
Source:Turkstat

== Economy ==
The province's economy is heavily defined by its hydrocarbon resources. Several major oil fields are located in the province, including the Batı Raman oil field, which produces about 7,000 barrels daily and is the largest oil field in Turkey.

Crude oil is transported via a 511 km (318 mi) pipeline constructed in 1967 from Batman to the port city of Dörtyol on the Mediterranean Sea. Another pipeline (41 km (25 mi)) connects Batman with Şelmo, the site of Turkey's second-largest oil field. Both pipelines are operated by BOTAŞ.

Energy infrastructure includes the Batman Dam, constructed between 1986 and 1999. It has a height of 85 meters and an annual power generation capacity of 483 GWh (peak power 198 MW). The associated reservoir has a surface area of 49 km^{2} and a volume of 1.175 km^{3}, supplying water to an area of 37,744 hectares (93,270 acres).

Oil fields of Batman Province
Name	Discovered	Production started in	Reserves (million bbl)	Production (bbl/day, 2007)
Batı Kozluca	1978	1980	138	1500
Batı Raman	1961	1962	1850	7000
Dinçer oil field	1988	1990	55	400
Garzan oil field	1951	1956	163	1700
İkiztepe oil field	1988	1990	53	400
Raman oil field	1940	1947	400	4000

== Historical sites ==
The province is rich in archaeological history. The most significant site, the ancient town of Hasankeyf, was largely submerged in 2020 following the completion of the Ilısu Dam. Several key monuments, including the Tomb of Zeynel Bey and the Artukid Bath, were relocated to a new archaeological park (New Hasankeyf) prior to the flooding.

Other notable historical sites include the Malabadi Bridge, built in 1146–1147 by the Artuqids near Silvan, and the Imam Abdullah Dervish monastery.

== Notable people ==
- Karapetê Xaço (1900–2005) – traditional singer of Kurdish Dengbêj music
- Cigerxwîn (1903–1984) – Kurdish poet, writer, and journalist
- Ali Rıza Alan (born 1947) – wrestler
- Ibrahim Bilgen (1949–2010) – politician and activist
- Hüseyin Kalkan (born 1950) – former mayor of Batman city
- Hüseyin Velioğlu (1952–2000) – leader of the Kurdish Hezbollah
- Mehmet Şimşek (born 1967) – politician, former Minister of Finance of Turkey
- Nalin Pekgul (born 1967) – politician
- Ayşe Acar Başaran (born 1985) – politician
- Mehmet Demir – politician
- Alan Ciwan – actor
- Şehmus Hazer (born 1999) – professional basketball player
- Sevgi Yorulmaz (born 1982) – Paralympic archer
- Mansur Çalar (born 1986) – footballer
- Nurullah Kaya (born 1986) – footballer
- Ahmet Arı (born 1989) – footballer
- Erdal Akdarı (born 1993) – footballer
- Mizgin Ay (born 2000) – track and field athlete

== See also ==
- Ilısu Dam Campaign
- Sasun Resistance (1894)
- Sasun Uprising (1904)
- Southeastern Anatolia Project
- List of populated places in Batman Province
- Yazidis
