= Dinçer oil field =

Oil field in Batman, Turkey

Dinçer
- Country: Turkey
- Region: Southeastern Anatolia Region
- Location: Batman
- Offshore/onshore: onshore
- Operator: Türkiye Petrolleri Anonim Ortaklığı

Production
- Current production of oil: 400 barrels per day (~20,000 t/a)
- Estimated oil in place: 7.5 million tonnes (~ 8.7×10^{6} m^{3} or 55 million bbl)

The Dinçer oil field is an oil field located in Batman, Batman Province, Southeastern Anatolia Region. It was discovered in 1988 and developed by Türkiye Petrolleri Anonim Ortaklığı. It began production in 1990 and produces oil. The total proven reserves of the Dinçer oil field are around 55 million barrels (7.5 million tonnes), and production is centered on 400 barrels per day (64 m^{3}/d).
