= Garzan oil field =

Oil field in Batman, Turkey

Coordinates: 38.031435°N 41.659698°E

Garzan
- Country: Turkey
- Region: Southeastern Anatolia Region
- Location: Batman
- Offshore/onshore: onshore
- Operator: Türkiye Petrolleri Anonim Ortaklığı

Production
- Current production of oil: 1,700 barrels per day (~85,000 t/a)
- Estimated oil in place: 22.2 million tonnes (~ 25.9×10^{6} m^{3} or 163 million bbl)

The Garzan oil field is an oil field located in Batman, Batman Province, Southeastern Anatolia Region. It was discovered in 1947–1951 and developed by Türkiye Petrolleri Anonim Ortaklığı. It began production in 1956. The total proven reserves of the Garzan oil field are around 163 million barrels (22.2 million tonnes), and production is about 1,700 barrels per day (270 m^{3}/d). The structure is a double plunging anticline bordered by a major reverse fault extending along the southern flank. The age of the Garzan formation is cretaceous, consisting of carbonates of a rudist build-up complex. Oil field contains 24 degree API (0.91 g/cm3) oil with a reservoir viscosity of 6.75 cp. Reservoir was initially highly undersaturated lists basic reservoirdata for Garzan.
