= Batı Raman oil field =

Oil field in southeast Turkey

Batı Raman
- Location within Turkey
- Country: Turkey
- Region: Southeastern Anatolia Region
- Location: Batman
- Offshore/onshore: onshore
- Coordinates: 37.84196°N 41.173468°E
- Operator: Türkiye Petrolleri Anonim Ortaklığı

Production
- Current production of oil: 7,000 barrels per day (~3.5×10^{5} t/a)
- Estimated oil in place: 252 million tonnes (~ 294×10^{6} m^{3} or 1850 million bbl)

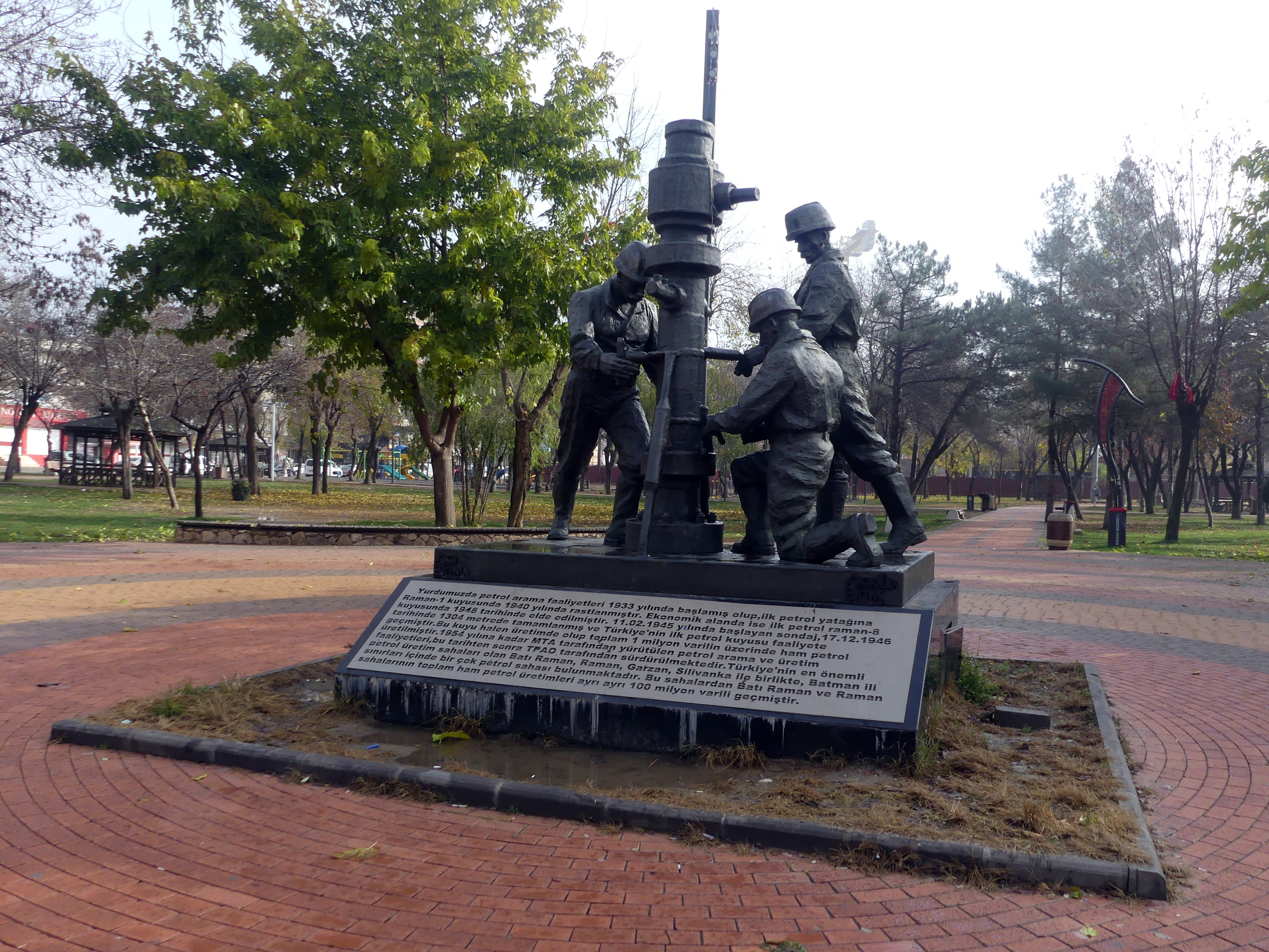
Oil Well Workers Monument, Batman City (Türkiye)

The Batı Raman oil field (batı meaning west in Turkish) is located in Batman Province, in the Southeastern Anatolia Region of Turkey. With estimated reserves of 1.85 billion barrels (252 million tonnes) and a production rate of around 7,500 barrels per day (1,190 m^{3}/d) from 300 wells (as of 2007), it is the largest and most productive oil field in Turkey.

The field is 18 km long and 3–5 km wide and is oriented from east to west. It is a few kilometres south of the city of Batman, with the Raman oil field lying to the east. The Batman River flows nearby, on the western side of the Batman city. The two fields are separated by a narrow fault system. The oil is classified as heavy. It has a density of 9.7–15 API (1.002–0.966 g/cm^{3}, 12 API or 1 g/cm^{3} on average) and a viscosity of 450–1000 cP at reservoir conditions. Oil is located at an average depth of 1310 meters and is capped by a layer of Garzan Limestone – a carbonate of Cretaceous period. The layer is about 64 m (210 ft) thick and lies at a depth of about 1320 m, it has an average porosity of 18%. Its measured permeability of 200–500 mD is higher than calculated bulk values of 10–100 mD indicating the presence of numerous cracks and fractures. The layer is rather heterogeneous, both laterally and vertically.

The field was discovered in 1961 and developed by Türkiye Petrolleri Anonim Ortaklığı. Oil production began in 1962 at a rate of 400 barrels per day (64 m^{3}/d) and rapidly increased to 9,000 bbl/d (1,400 m^{3}/d) in 1969 but then declined. The major oil production mechanism was expansion of fluid, which was pressurized to about 1800 psi, but the pressure dropped to about 400 psi due to extraction. Considering the high density and viscosity of the oil, only 1.5% of the deposit could be extracted by the natural mechanism and this limit was quickly exhausted – about 94 million barrels (14,900,000 m^{3}) (5%) of oil had been recovered from the field by 2007. The pressure was raised by injecting water and later carbon dioxide. About 3.2 million barrels (510,000 m^{3}) of water were pumped into the field from 1971 to 1978, followed by CO_{2} injection in 1987. This increased production after 1987, which peaked at 13,000 bbl/d (2,100 m^{3}/d) in 1993 and is gradually declining since then. Only about 20 wells were drilled by 1967 but a hundred new ones were added by 1969. Some wells were abandoned then and their total number decreased to about 90 in 1987 but then gradually increased again to about 200 by 1995. The productivity of most wells is close to 40 bbl/d (6.4 m^{3}/d).
