= Batı Kozluca oil field =

Oil field in Batman, Turkey

Batı Kozluca
- Country: Turkey
- Region: Southeastern Anatolia Region
- Location: Batman
- Offshore/onshore: onshore
- Operator: Türkiye Petrolleri Anonim Ortaklığı

Production
- Current production of oil: 1,500 barrels per day (~75,000 t/a)
- Estimated oil in place: 18.8 million tonnes (~ 21.9×10^{6} m^{3} or 138 million bbl)

The Batı Kozluca oil field is an oil field located in Batman, Batman Province, Southeastern Anatolia Region. It was discovered in 1978 and developed by Türkiye Petrolleri Anonim Ortaklığı. It began production in 1980 and produces oil. The total proven reserves of the Batı Kozluca oil field are around 138 million barrels (18.8 million tonnes), and production is centered on 1,500 barrels per day (240 m^{3}/d).
