= Batman (electoral district) =

Electoral district for the Grand National Assembly of Turkey

Coordinates: 37°50′N 34°45′E

- electoral district for the Grand National Assembly of Turkey
- Batman shown within Turkey
- Province: Batman
- Electorate: 270,392

Current electoral district
- Created: 1991
- Seats: 5
- Turnout at last election: 83.82%
- Representation
- DEM: 3 / 5
- AK Party: 1 / 5
- Free Cause Party: 1 / 5

Batman is an electoral district of the Grand National Assembly of Turkey. It elects four members of parliament (deputies) to represent the province of the same name for a four-year term by the D'Hondt method, a party-list proportional representation system.

== Members ==
Population reviews of each electoral district are conducted before each general election, which can lead to certain districts being granted a smaller or greater number of parliamentary seats. Batman became an electoral district for the 1991 general election and has continuously elected four MPs.

MPs for Batman, 2002 onwards
| Election | 2002 (22nd Parliament) | 2007 (23rd Parliament) | 2011 (24th Parliament) | June 2015 (25th Parliament) | November 2015 (26th Parliament) |
| MP | Afif Demirkıran; AK Party | Mehmet Emin Ekmen; AK Party | Ziver Özdemir; AK Party | | Ataullah Hamidi; AK Party |
| MP | Ahmet İnal; AK Party | | Mehmet Şimşek; AK Party | Ali Atalan; HDP | Mehmet Ali Aslan; HDP |
| MP | Mehmet Ali Suçin; AK Party | Ayla Akat Ata; Independent | Ayla Akat Ata HDP | Saadet Becerekli; HDP | |
| MP | Mehmet Nezir Nasıroğlu; CHP | Bengi Yıldız; Independent | Bengi Yıldız HDP | Ayşe Acar Başaran; HDP | |

== General elections ==
=== 2011 ===
2011 general election: Batman
| Party | Candidate | Votes | % | ±% |
|---|---|---|---|---|
| Independent | 2 elected 0: Bengi Yıldız ✓ Ayla Akat Ata ✓ | 113,378 | 51.48 | ▲12.06 |
| AK Party | 2 elected 0: 1. Mehmet Şimşek ✓; 2. Ziver Özdemir ✓; 3. Ayhan İsen ✗; 4. Mustafa Demir ✗ | 81,778 | 37.13 | ▼9.28 |
| CHP | None elected: 1. Faris Özdemir ✗; 2. Mehmet Can Avcı ✗; 3. Mehmet İhsan Erman ✗; 4. Vehbi Ağaya ✗ | 14,754 | 6.70 | ▲2.79 |
| Büyük Birlik | None elected: 1. Recep Er ✗; 2. Ecevit Bayralı ✗; 3. Medeni Orhan ✗; 4. Şahabettin Gün ✗ | 3,282 | 1.49 | ▲1.49 |
| SAADET | None elected: 1. Salih Sevim ✗; 2. Ahmet Çiftçi ✗; 3. Mustafa Yıldız ✗; 4. İbrahim Güneş ✗ | 2,156 | 0.98 | ▼0.94 |
| MHP | None elected: 1. İsa Boran ✗; 2. Nihat Ercan ✗; 3. Mehmet Aktaş ✗; 4. Mehmet Ali Acar ✗ | 1,281 | 0.58 | ▼0.35 |
| DP | None elected: 1. Murat Şentürk ✗; 2. Esen Sarı ✗; 3. Ahmet Güneş ✗; 4. Mehmet Ramazan Kebabcılar ✗ | 930 | 0.42 | ▼5.34 |
| HAS Party | None elected: 1. Osman Bağaç ✗; 2. Kenan Özoğul ✗; 3. Özlem Şahin Ermiş ✗; 4. Mehmet Metin Emen ✗ | 873 | 0.40 | ▲0.40 |
| DSP | None elected: 1. Kadri Yaman ✗; 2. Üzeyir Çelik ✗; 3. Mehmet Tahir Türk ✗; 4. Yusuf Yalçın ✗ | 720 | 0.33 | N/A |
| Communist_Party_of_Turkey_(today) | None elected: 1. Oya Sönmez ✗; 2. Başak Yaman ✗; 3. Evrim Kaya ✗; 4. Cüneyt Arslan ✗ | 460 | 0.21 | ▼0.12 |
| DYP | None elected: 1. Abdulvehap Uruk ✗; 2. Hanifi Taşdemir ✗; 3. Osman Cengiz ✗; 4. Mahşuk Özcan ✗ | 188 | 0.09 | ▲0.09 |
| Liberal Democrat | None elected: 1. Aziz Polat ✗; 2. Mehmet Emin Yıldırım ✗; 3. Rifat Aksoy ✗; 4. Saadet Polat ✗ | 167 | 0.08 | ▲0.07 |
| MP | None elected: 1. Mehmet Göktekin ✗; 2. Nazmi Filiz ✗; 3. İbrahim Çelik ✗; 4. Nurcan Has ✗ | 155 | 0.07 | ▲0.07 |
| Nationalist Conservative | None elected: 1. Veysel Özel ✗; 2. Orhan Yıldırım ✗; 3. Nevzat Demir ✗; 4. Zeki Sürgün ✗ | 112 | 0.05 | ▲0.05 |
| HEPAR | No candidates | 0 | 0.00 | 0.00 |
| Labour | No candidates | 0 | 0.00 | 0.00 |
| Total votes | | 220,234 | 100.00 | |
| Rejected ballots | | 6,774 | 2.99 | ▲1.37 |
| Turnout | | 226,642 | 83.82 | ▲8.08 |
| Independent gain from AK Party Majority | | 31,600 | 14.35 | ▲21.34 |

=== June 2015 ===
| Abbr. | Party | Votes | % |
|---|---|---|---|
| HDP | Peoples' Democratic Party | 191,310 | 72.6% |
| AKP | Justice and Development Party | 47,921 | 18.2% |
| HÜDA-PAR | Free Cause Party | 14,551 | 5.5% |
| MHP | Nationalist Movement Party | 2,752 | 1% |
| CHP | Republican People's Party | 2,083 | 0.8% |
| | Other | 4,986 | 1.9% |
| Total | | 263,604 | |
| Turnout | | 90.25 | |
source: YSK

=== November 2015 ===
| Abbr. | Party | Votes | % |
|---|---|---|---|
| HDP | Peoples' Democratic Party | 177,129 | 68.1% |
| AKP | Justice and Development Party | 73,775 | 28.4% |
| CHP | Republican People's Party | 3,101 | 1.2% |
| MHP | Nationalist Movement Party | 1,654 | 0.6% |
| | Other | 4,254 | 1.6% |
| Total | | 259,913 | |
| Turnout | | 85.84 | |
source: YSK

=== 2018 ===
| Abbr. | Party | Votes | % |
|---|---|---|---|
| HDP | Peoples' Democratic Party | 180,318 | 63.5% |
| AKP | Justice and Development Party | 67,789 | 23.9% |
| HÜDA-PAR | Free Cause Party | 15,998 | 5.6% |
| SP | Felicity Party | 8,971 | 3.2% |
| CHP | Republican People's Party | 3,740 | 1.3% |
| IYI | Good Party | 3,127 | 1.1% |
| MHP | Nationalist Movement Party | 2,833 | 1% |
| | Other | 1,284 | 0.5% |
| Total | | 284,060 | |
| Turnout | | 85.67 | |
source: YSK

== Presidential elections ==
=== 2014 ===
2014 presidential election: Batman
| Party | Candidate | Votes | % |
|---|---|---|---|
| HDP | Selahattin Demirtaş | 134,370 | 60.00 |
| AK Party | Recep Tayyip Erdoğan | 85,153 | 38.02 |
| Independent | Ekmeleddin İhsanoğlu | 4,424 | 1.98 |
| Total votes | | 223,947 | 100.00 |
| Rejected ballots | | 3,799 | 1.67 |
| Turnout | | 227,746 | 75.71 |
| Selahattin Demirtaş win | | | |
