= Alan Ciwan =

Kurdish actor

- Born: Batman, Turkey
- Years active: 2005-present
- Known for: Kurd Idol

Alan Ciwan is a Kurdish actor and TV presenter from Batman, Turkey. He is a presenter of the Kurd Idol talent competition. Ciwan started acting on the stage in 2005 before moving to Istanbul in 2009. He currently lives in Berlin, Germany, where he moved in 2017.

Ciwan starred in Di Tuwalete De ('On the Toilet'), a popular Kurdish theatre play written by Rênas Jiyan, for which he received the Best Male Actor award from the Association of Theatre Critics (TEB) in Turkey and has appeared in several films, including Falling from Heaven, One Hundred Years of Solitude and Salvation Rain
