= Democratic Society Party closure case =

Kurdish political party in Turkey

The closure case of the Democratic Society Party (DTP) between 2007 and 2009 was against a pro-Kurdish political party in Turkey which was accused of opposing the unity of the country and having links to the Kurdistan Workers' Party (PKK). The case was opened in September 2007 and resulted in the closure of the party in December 2009. The DTP was the 25th political party which was banned in the Turkish Republic since 1962.

== Background ==
The Republic of Turkey has a history of closing a number of pro-Kurdish parties. The Democracy Party (DEP), the People's Labor Party (HEP) and also the People's Democracy Party (HADEP) have been closed before. At the same time of the DTP closure case, also the Justice and Development Party (AKP) of Recep Tayyip Erdogan was facing a closure trial.

=== Requirements ===
For the closure of a party the Constitutional Court of Turkey needs a ruling of a qualified majority which in the closure case of the Democratic Society Party (DTP) meant a majority of 7 judges out of 11.

== Trial ==
=== Indictment ===
On 16 September 2007, the state prosecutor of the Supreme Court Abdurrahman Yalcinkaya submitted an indictment before the Constitutional Court demanding the closure of the DTP. In the indictment the prosecutor reasoned that the speeches and actions of the party were against the unity of the state which was contrary to the Turkish Constitution and the Law on Political Parties. That the DTP demanded education in the native language and a federal administration were viewed as evidence of the party receiving orders by Abdullah Öcalan, the imprisoned leader of the Kurdistan Workers' Party (PKK). The prosecution also requested a political ban for 221 party members of the DTP. The state prosecutor Abdurrahman Yalcinkaya repeated his demand for the closure of the party in June 2008.

=== Defense ===
The DTP submitted their written defense in June 2008, arguing that 129 out of 141 evidences provided by the prosecution should be viewed in light of freedom of expression. After the DTP requested more time for an oral defense, the court ordered the postponement of the oral defense to the 16 September 2008. In the oral defense, DTP-chairman Ahmet Türk argued that the court should take into consideration the values of the European Court of Human Rights (ECHR) and the Venice Commission and opposed the use of weapons to solve the problems of the country while urging for a democratic solution.

=== Further developments ===
Following the oral defense of the DTP, the court began to view the provided evidence and defense. The Courts presiding judge Haşim Kılıç stated that there were about 150 trials of DTP politicians which needed to be examined before coming to a conclusion and announced a decision might come after the Municipal Elections in 2009. The Turkish politician Devlet Bahçeli of the Nationalist Movement Party (MHP) supported the party's prosecution in 2008 and the European Union, of which Turkey aspired a membership, had opposed the trial and demanded more rights for the Kurdish population in Turkey. After the DTP suggested an autonomy in Southeast Anatolia in order to find a solution to the Kurdish Turkish conflict, the state prosecutor pressured the Court of Cassation to ban the party in early November 2009. Just days before the verdict, the Human Rights Association of Turkey demanded a democratic solution for the Kurdish Question in the Grand National Assembly of Turkey.

=== Verdict ===
On 11 December 2009 the Court of Cassation under the presidency of Haşim Kılıç banned the party with eleven votes, thus making it a unanimous decision. Kılıç reasoned that there was no difference between the PKK and the DTP and that nowhere in the world had a terrorist organization the right to express itself freely. Additionally to the closure, thirty-seven politicians received a five-year ban on political activities. Among the notable politicians targeted with the political ban were the party co-Chairs Ahmet Türk and Aysel Tugluk, and Nurettin Demirtas, Hüseyin Kalkan, Leyla Zana, Musa Farisoğulları, and Selim Sadak.

=== Aftermath ===
As a result of the verdict, the parties′ properties were transferred to the Turkish treasury. The party closure was contrary to the aims of the Government of the Justice and Development Party (AKP) which supported a political solution. The European Union, of which Turkey aspired a membership, had opposed the trial in the past. The remaining politicians of the DTP announced their withdrawal from the Grand National Assembly of Turkey, but at the request of Abdullah Öcalan, the leader of the Kurdistan Workers' Party (PKK) the politicians returned to the assembly.

== Appeal before the European Court of Human Rights ==
In January 2010 Hasip Kaplan, a former member of the DTP appealed to the European Court of Human Rights. In 2016 the ECHR ruled that the speeches and actions by the DTP politicians were not seen as support of Abdullah Öcalan or the Kurdistan Workers' Parties even though the co-presidents of the DTP refused to call the PKK a terrorist organization and ordered Turkey to pay a monetary compensation of €30,000 to each of the two co-chairs.

== See also ==
- Peoples' Democratic Party closure case
