= Ayşe Acar Başaran =

Turkish politician

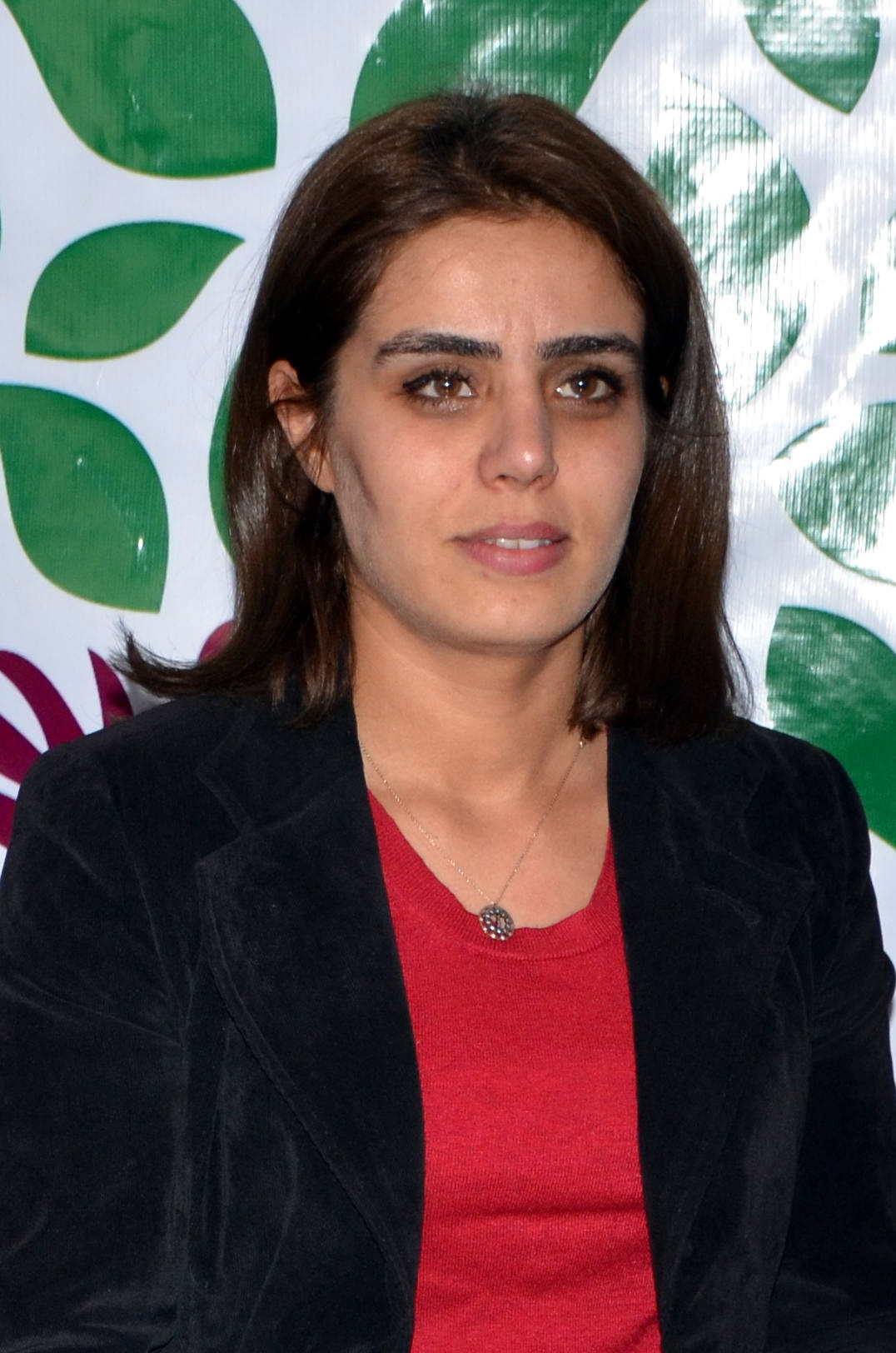

Member of the Grand National Assembly
- In office 23 November 2015 – 14 May 2023
- Constituency: Batman (June 2015, Nov 2015, 2018)

Personal details
- Born: 2 October 1985 (age 40) Batman, Turkey, Turkey
- Party: Peoples' Democratic Party (HDP)
- Other political affiliations: BDP
- Education: Dokuz Eylül University

Ayşe Acar Başaran (born 2 October 1985) is a Kurdish lawyer and politician of the People's Democratic Party (HDP). She is a current Member of Parliament for the city of Batman in Turkey. She was appointed spokesperson for the HDP Women's Council at the 4th HDP Party Conference in February 2020.

== Early life ==
Başaran was born in Batman on 2 October 1985, as the second of the four children of Kurdish parents Abdurrahman Acar and Sultani Acar. After completing school education in Batman, she graduated from Dokuz Eylül University Faculty of Law in 2010. Başaran worked as a lawyer for the Batman Bar Association for 4 years. She is a member of the Free Women's Congress Association.

== Political career ==
In 2013 and 2014, the HDP's predecessor party, the Peace and Democracy Party (BDP) provincial executive appointed Başaran to its women's council. In the June 2015 Turkish general election, Başaran was elected as the HDP's Batman deputy to parliament. She was re-elected in the November 2015 Turkish general election.

In October 2018, Turkish police arrested many HDP members in the run up to local elections, including the co-chairs of the party in Batman, Nizamettin Toguc and Berivan Helen Isik on charges of supporting terrorism. Başaran accused the Turkish authorities of beating up her party colleagues and abusing the rule of law for political purposes. In March 2019, Başaran stated that 713 party members had been arrested in the run up to local elections.

In January 2020, Başaran criticised Turkish authorities in the aftermath of earthquakes which killed 39 people, saying "for the sake of [more] rent, the public's health and the right to life is ignored".

In February 2020, Başaran was included in the new HDP Party Assembly at the 4th Party Congress in Ankara, but was not included in the Party's executive committee, having already served two terms. Instead she will take part in working groups, and was elected as chair of the party's Women's Council. As the spokeswomen for the women's branch of the HDP, she criticized the withdrawal from the Istanbul convention which defends women's rights.

== Legal prosecution ==
On the 17 March 2021, the state prosecutor Bekir Şahin demanded for her and 686 other HDP politicians a five-year ban to a political activity together with a closure of the HDP due to organizational links with the Kurdistan Workers' Party (PKK). In July 2021 a request for the lifting of her parliamentary immunity was brought forward in the Turkish parliament.
