= Adnan Karim =

Kurdish singer

Adnan Karim MSc.
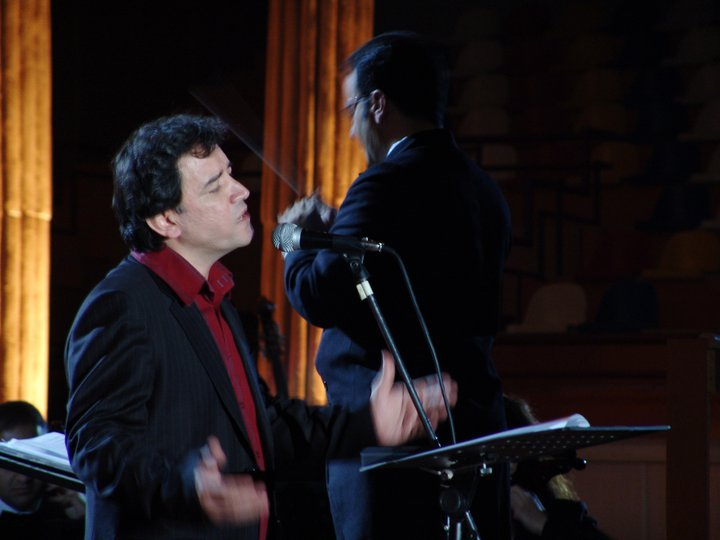
- Adnan Karim in a concert with the Iraqi International Symphony Orchestra in Slemani, Kurdistan Region, Iraq
- Born: Adnan Karim Rashid; 1963 (age 62–63); Kirkuk, Kirkuk Governorate
- Citizenship: Iraq & Sweden
- Education: Institute of Fine Arts of Slemani
- Occupations: Singer; composer; musician; painter
- Television: Kurd Idol
- Title: Assistant Lecturer of painting at University of Sulaymaniyah
- Children: 3
- Musical career
- Origin: bazyannnnn
- Genres: Traditional Kurdish music, classical music
- Instrument: Oud
- Years active: 1979–present
- Website: www.adnankarim.net

Adnan Karim (Sorani Kurdish: عەدنان کەریم / Ednan Kerîm; born 1963) is a prominent Kurdish singer, known for his song adaptations of classical Kurdish poems. He is also a painter.

== Early life ==
Adnan Karim Rashid was born in 1963 in Kirkuk. Although he came from a financially challenged family, he managed to receive a high level of education. They moved to Iraqi Kurdistan due to the First Iraqi–Kurdish War.

He is a 1985 graduate of the Institute of Fine Arts of Slemani as a painter. Over the years, famous Kurdish musicians influenced him when developing his musical talent.

== Career ==
Adnan Karim's first public performance as a musical artist was in 1979. The authenticity of Adnan's style is admired especially by Kurdish people due to the purity of his traditional melodies and the absence of particularly modern elements. The genuine sound of his compositions is rounded up by the harmony between lyrics, sound, and the choice of musical instruments. Audiences get a genuine feeling of the deep and melancholic message delivered by the songs. His soft, deep voice is accompanied by oriental instruments which are deep rooted in Kurdish music.

Threatened by Saddam Hussein's regime and the attacks on Kurdish people in the 1990s, Karims's family chose to go into exile to Sweden in 1992. He continued to work on his particular style even while in exile, enrolling in specialised courses. Today, Adnan's music is appreciated both in the Middle East (specifically the Kurdish areas in various countries across the region) and parts of Europe.

Adnan Karim uses first and foremost Kurdish classical poetry which stretches back to the 17th century. His singing in different Kurdish dialects with an excellent prosody (patterns of sound and beats in poetry) so that every one who listens to him can be caught up in provincial feeling so the listeners accept him as one of their local singers.

He prefers to sing accompanied by different instruments with different sounds. He composes his own music and often plays the instruments himself.

Adnan Karim has up to now taken part in many culture and international arrangements. In the year 2000, Adnan, together with a few musicians, had a successful and much talked about concert in the famous concert hall in Stockholm.

He also performed with Living Fire Ensemble in Gothenburg on 02.12.06 and in Stockholm on 02.12.07.

After years of inactivity, he reappeared in the Kurd Idol TV program as one of the judges.

== Discography ==
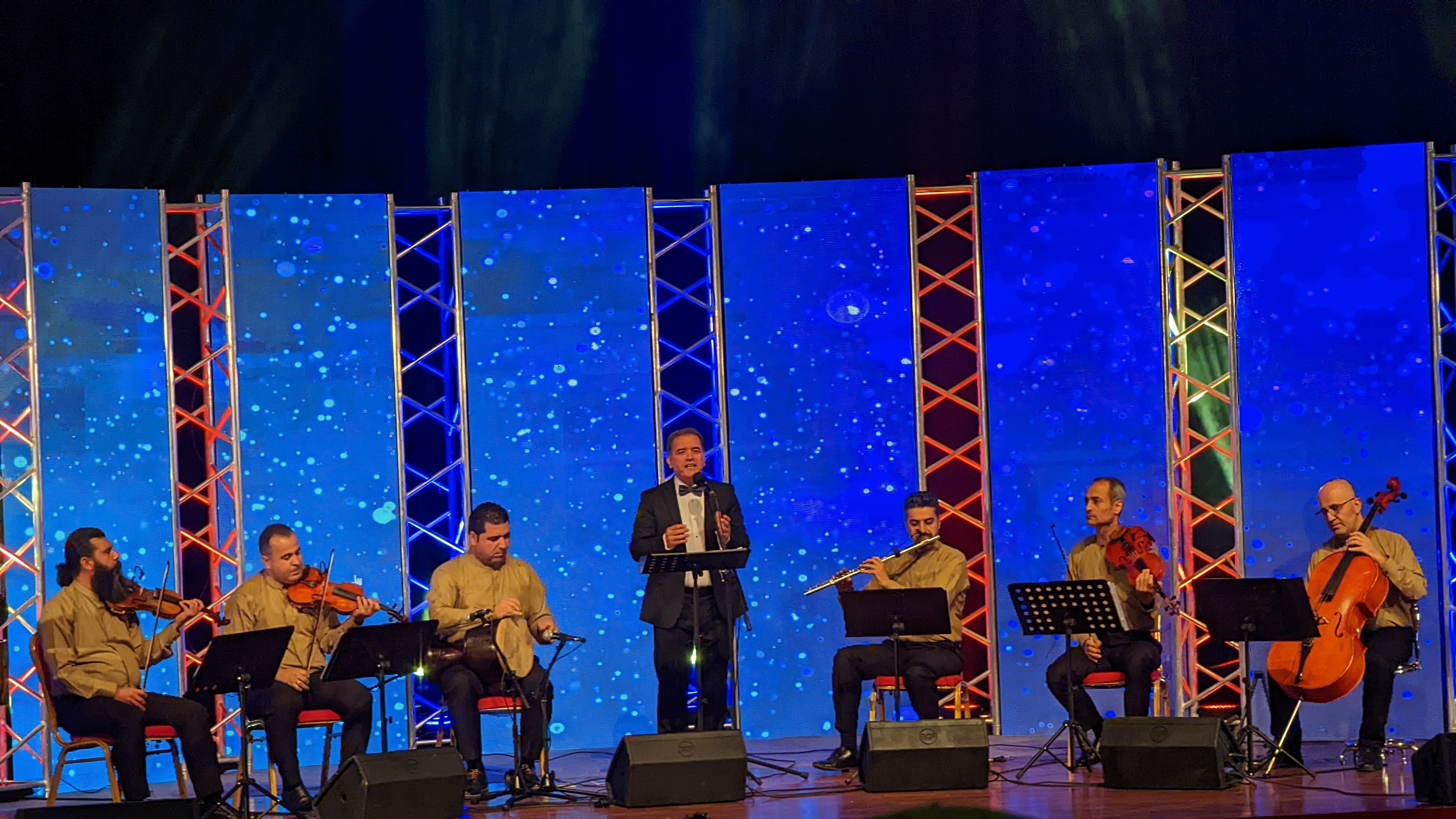
Adnan Karim's concert in Erbil (June 2022).

=== Albums ===
- Bîrtan Dekem (1993)
- Raz (1995)
- Şewî Yelda (1996)
- Eroy Oxîr (1999)
- Shnaî Ba (2002)
- Live Consert (2002)
- Tavgeyek le Ishq (2004)
- Consert Sulaymaniyah / lyrics : Nali (2005)
- Emshow (Tonight) (2006)
- Wefayi (2010)
- Xatunakam, (2011)
- Badey Golrang I (2012)
- Badey Golrang II (2013)
- Guli Nazdar (2014)
- Hebîbe (2017)
- Şewba (2019)
- Shar(City) (2022)
- Gwareh (2026)

== See also ==
- Kurdish music
- List of Kurdish musical artists
