= Hüseyin Kalkan =

Turkish politician

Mayor of Batman
- In office 2002–2009
- Preceded by: Abdullah Akin
- Succeeded by: Necdet Atalay

Personal details
- Born: c. 1950 (age 75–76)

Hüseyin Kalkan (c. 1950) is the former mayor of Batman in Southeast Anatolia, Turkey, and a member of the Democratic Society Party (DTP). He gained international notoriety November 2008 after he announced plans to sue Christopher Nolan, director of The Dark Knight film, over the allegedly unauthorized use of his city's name.

In August 2007, British newspaper The Guardian, as an aside in the last of a 25 paragraph story concerning honor suicide in the region, claimed that Kalkan had been awarded damages by DC Comics for using his city's name in their Batman comic book franchise. However, the 2008 news coverage reporting on the Nolan lawsuit (including The Guardian) made no mention of this claim. In fact, news sources made a point of noting that Kalkan was not suing DC Comics nor had he raised concerns about infringement before the Nolan lawsuit.

In September 2008 the mayor was sentenced to a year imprisonment for promoting terrorism for which in 2019 the European Court of Human Rights sentenced Turkey to pay Kalkan the sum of 3500 Euros in compensation. After the DTP was banned by the Constitutional Court in 2009, he was prohibited to get active in politics for five years.
