= Nejdet Atalay =

Kurdish Mayor of Batman, Turkey

Nejdet Atalay (born 1978) is a former politician of the Democratic Society Party (DTP) and Mayor of Batman. He has been a supporter of Kurdish cultural and language rights and made the first legal defense in the Kurdish language in a Turkish court in 2013.

== Early life and education ==
He was born to a Kurdish family in 1978 in a village in Kozluk, Batman and graduated from the Dicle University where he studied Mechanical engineering. He is married and is the father of two children. In 2006 he was the head of the diyarbakir branch of the Democratic Society Party (DTP).

== Political career ==
His political career was marked with his support for the Kurdistan Workers Party (PKK), which is prohibited in Turkey, but he views to have returned the Kurds their pride for their identity as Kurds. As the head of the Diyarbakir branch of the DTP, he aimed for similar rights for the Kurds which the Scots, the Catalans or Basques have which are an official recognition as a people, a regional government and parliament. After he attended a funeral of militants of the PKK which is an illegal organization in Turkey, he was arrested in April 2006. He defended himself that he attended the funeral in order to calm the crowd. He was released pending trial in July the same year. In 2008 he was sentenced to 10 months imprisonment for terror related charges, with the court reasoning that he also stayed when the crowd began to show symbols of the PKK, a decision he appealed. After the appeal court also confirmed the sentence, he appealed to the European Court of Human Rights. In April 2020, the ECHR ruled in favor of Atalay and condemned Turkey to recompense him with 7000 Euro.

=== Mayor of Batman ===
During his electoral campaign towards the Mayorship of Batman he criticized the use of the Kurdish language by the Justice and Development Party (AKP). In the municipal elections of March 2009 he was elected with 60%. On 24 December 2009, he was arrested and accused with terror related charges. As in 2010 in Batman the first Kurdish film festival was organized in Batman, a letter of the imprisoned Nejdet Atalay was read out in the Kurdish language highlighting the struggles the Kurds have to go through at a time their language is recognized as "an unknown language".

=== Imprisonment ===
During his imprisonment he demanded to make his defense in the Kurdish language, also becoming the first ever to give a testimony in the Kurdish language in January 2013. In the case against members of alleged members of the Kurdistan Communities Union (KCK), he was the first to have been permitted to give a testimony in the Kurdish language in January 2013. In a separate trial he was sentenced to two years imprisonment for having called the militants of the PKK "warriors for the Kurdish people in the mountains". There he also gave he testimony in the Kurdish language, but the court wrote that he spoke in a language it "believes" to be the Kurdish language. On the 1 July 2014 he was released from prison with a ruling seeing the KCK case.

Later he went into exile.
