= Kurd Idol =

Kurdish television talent show

- Logo since 2017
- Genre: Reality television
- Created by: Simon Fuller
- Presented by: Alan Ciwan, Şatwan Ata
- Judges: Bijan Kamkar, Kanî, Adnan Karim and Nizamettin Ariç
- Country of origin: Kurdistan
- Original languages: Kurdish Dialects (including Kurmanji, Sorani, Gorani, Zazaki, Southern Kurdish)
- No. of seasons: 1
- No. of episodes: 26 (as for May 9, 2017) (list of episodes)

Production
- Producer: Çekdar ERKIRAN
- Production locations: Silêmanî, Kurdistan Region, Iraq
- Camera setup: Multiple Cameras
- Running time: 60 minutes (±10 mins)
- Production company: Glob Inc

Original release
- Network: Kurdsat
- Release: April 9 – May 9, 2017

Kurd Idol (Kurdish: کورد ئایدڵ / Kurd Aydil) is the first international franchise in Kurdish television history. It is part of the Idols franchise , created by Simon Fuller, and owned by 19 Entertainment and FremantleMedia. Kurdsat acquired the production and broadcast rights for Kurd Idol. The series aims to find new solo recording artists from across the Kurdish diaspora and the winner would be decided by viewers' votes through the Internet, telephone and text messages. The contest was aimed to select Kurdish singers from the historical Kurdistan region and diaspora.

== Audition ==
Auditions for Kurd Idol have been held in Kurdish cities of Van, Hewlêr, Mêrdîn, Sine, Silêmanî, and outside the region - in Berlin, Istanbul, Stockholm, Düsseldorf, Tbilisi and Yerevan.

== Season 1 ==
=== Jury ===
- Kanî
- Ednan Kerîm
- Nizamettin Ariç
- Bijan Kamkar, left show because of health problems.

=== Contestants ===
17 contestants have been chosen among more than 2,000 candidates who auditioned and 172 candidates who were chosen by judges to attend the subsequent theatre round in Silêmanî, Kurdistan Region.

Order	Contestant	Age	Native Dialect	Hometown
1	Aştî Ezîz	23	Sorani	Hewlêr, Southern Kurdistan
2	Bane Şîrwan	16	Sorani	Silêmanî, Southern Kurdistan
3	Cengiz Yazgı	29	Kurmanji	Istanbul, Turkey
4	Evîn Osman	29	Sorani	Gothenburg, Sweden
5	Ferzad Mehdî	26	Gorani	Merîwan, Eastern Kurdistan
—	Hêvî Zîn	18	Kurmanji	Mêrdîn, Northern Kurdistan
6	Eşkan Ebdulrehman	25	Sorani	Silêmanî, Southern Kurdistan
7	Jînda Kenco	25	Kurmanji	Kobanî, Western Kurdistan
8	Roza Gergerî	25	Kurmanji	Tbilisi, Georgia
9	Songül Düzgün	34	Zazaki	Dêrsim, Northern Kurdistan
10	Tanya Aso	19	Sorani	Silêmanî, Southern Kurdistan
11	Vedat Akarsu	19	Kurmanji	Batman, Northern Kurdistan
12	Xezel Mustefa	22	Sorani	Serdeşt, Eastern Kurdistan
13	Rewan Îbrahîm	24	Kurmanji	Qamişlo, Western Kurdistan
14	Zêrevan Casim	20	Sorani	Erbil, Southern Kurdistan
15	Mustefa Salar	28	Sorani	Silêmanî, Southern Kurdistan
16	Ronî Artîn	24	Kurmanji	Mêrdîn, Northern Kurdistan
17	Ebdulla Mehemed	26	Sorani	Hewlêr, Southern Kurdistan

=== Voting ===
According to the fact, that Kurdistan does not exist as a nation state, that is why the voting was able in three parts of the region — Eastern Kurdistan and whole Iran, Northern Kurdistan and whole Turkey, Southern Kurdistan and whole Iraq. The voting numbers were launched in few European countries where the Kurdish diaspora lives, particularly voting was able from Germany, Sweden, France and Denmark. Due to the war in Syria, voting was not able in Rojava Kurdistan.

=== Results ===
(Co-)s
Females	Males	Winner	Bottom	Elimination

Stage:		Finals				
Date:		6/16	6/23	6/30	7/7	7/14
Place	Contestant	Result				
1	Jînda Kenco					Winner
2	Ferzad Mehdî					1st Runner-Up
3	Xezel Mistefa					2nd Runner-Up
4	Vedat Akarsu		Btm 5			Eliminated in Final
5	Bana Shirwan					Eliminated in Final
6	Cengiz Yazgı			Btm 4		Eliminated in Final
7–9	Aştî Ezîz				Elim	
7–9	Zêrevan Casim				Elim	
7–9	Tanya Aso			Btm 4	Elim	
10–11	Rewan Îbrahîm			Elim		
10–11	Ronî Artîn	Btm 4	Btm 5	Elim		
12	Eşkan Ebdulrehman	Btm 4	WD			
13–15	Roza Gergerî		Elim			
13–15	Ebdulla Mihemed		Elim			
13–15	Evîn Osman		Elim			
16–17	Songül Düzgün	Elim				
16–17	Mistefa Salar	Elim				

=== Prize ===
- Kurd Idol album and recording contract
