= Batman University =

Public university in Batman, Turkey

- Batman Üniversitesi
- Seal of Batman University
- Established: 2007
- Rector: İdris Demir
- Location: Batman, Turkey; 37.7889°N 41.0650°E
- Website: batman.edu.tr

Batman University (Turkish: Batman Üniversitesi) is an institution of higher education located in Batman, Turkey, established on 28 May 2007. It was one of 17 new universities created by Law number 5662, which amended the Law on the Organization of Institutes of Higher Education and related Statutory Decrees.

In January 2017, President Recep Tayyip Erdoğan appointed Aydın Durmuş rector of the university. Durmuş was replaced by İdris Demir in February 2021.

== History ==
Batman University was founded on May 28, 2007, with Additional Article 88 of Law on Amendments to the Statements Attached to the Law on the Organization of Institutes of Higher Education, to the Statutory Decree on Academic Faculty Members of Institutes of Higher Education, and to the Statutory Decree on General Faculty and Procedure number 5662.

The Batman Vocational School of Higher Education was established in affiliation with the Ministry of National Education Bureau of Universal and Formal Institutes of Higher Education during the 1975–1976 academic year and was merged with Dicle University in 1982 with Statutory Decree number 41. The institution assumed the name Batman University in 2007, separating from Dicle University, and was managed by proxy through the İnönü University rector.

Batman University attained its self-governance on September 9, 2008, with the appointment of Prof. Dr. Abdüsselam Uluçam as rector. The current rector, Aydın Durmuş, was appointed on January 22, 2017, and the university opened the Kozluk, Hasankeyf, and Sason campuses, in addition to the existing Central and West Raman campuses, for the 2018–2019 academic year.

The university has seven faculties, three institutes, four colleges, seven vocational schools, and 12 research centers. Serving approximately 15,000 students at these units of the university are 395 faculty members and 294 administrative personnel.
