= İbrahim Bilgen =

Turkish politician and activist (1949–2010)

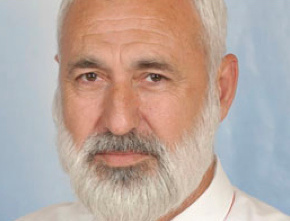

Personal details
- Born: 2 March 1949 Batman, Turkey
- Died: 31 May 2010 (aged 61) On voyage from Istanbul to Gaza City
- Cause of death: Israeli gunfire
- Party: Felicity Party
- Website: www.trenbileti.com

İbrahim Bilgen (2 March 1949 – 31 May 2010) was a Turkish politician, electrical engineer and activist. He was born in Batman, Turkey and killed by the Israel Defense Forces in the 2010 Gaza flotilla raid.

== Early life and education ==
Bilgen was born on 2 March 1949 in Batman to a Kurdish family that had migrated to Turkey from Mosul, Iraq. He graduated from Fırat University, where he studied electrical engineering, and was a member of the Chamber of Electrical Engineers of Turkey. He had been a resident of Siirt, a south-eastern city of Turkey, since 1980. He was married and had six children.

== Political career ==
Bilgen was one of the founders of Virtue Party. After the Virtue Party was banned by the Constitutional Court of Turkey in 2001, he joined the newly formed Felicity Party. He was a candidate for Member of Turkish Parliament in 2007 for that party for Siirt Province, but he was not elected, the Felicity Party receiving 884 votes (0.96%) there. In 2009 Turkish local elections, he was a candidate for mayor of Siirt, but he was again not elected. In a press interview during his 2009 campaign, he said: "I was born a Felicity man, I will die a Felicity man. Because Felicity is the only national party of Turkey. This party has neither come under the yoke of America, nor of any other country." Since then, he had been serving as a provincial inspector for the Felicity Party.

== Business career ==
After working as an electrical engineer in various companies, İbrahim Bilgen founded an electrical engineering company called Bilgen Mühendislik, in 2004. In addition, he founded the first local television channel in Siirt, Selam TV.

== Death ==
As a volunteer for IHH in Siirt, Bilgen joined the Gaza flotilla of May 2010 on board the MV Mavi Marmara, which set sail from Istanbul for the Gaza Strip on 23 May 2010. He died on 31 May 2010, during the Gaza flotilla raid.

According to an autopsy Bilgen died from four gunshot wounds to temple, chest, hip and back.

== Reactions to his death ==
- Afif Demirkıran, Member of Parliament for the AK Party from Siirt, said: "May Allah accept the martyrdom of İbrahim Bilgen."
- A press statement by the Chamber of Electrical Engineers of Turkey stated: "We condemn the attack of Israel in which one of our members was killed."
- Photographs of İbrahim Bilgen were hung in the streets in Siirt.
- Numan Kurtulmuş, Felicity Party leader, held his photo during a press conference and called him a "martyr".
- American author and journalist Ali Abunimah has reported a claim by Sheikh Raed Salah, a leader of the Islamic Movement in Israel who was also on board the Mavi Marmara, that Bilgen may have been deliberately targeted for execution by Israeli forces who mistook him for Raed Salah, and lists some pieces of circumstantial evidence that support this claim.
