= Raman oil field =

Oil field in Batman, Turkey

Raman
- Country: Turkey
- Region: Southeastern Anatolia Region
- Location: Batman
- Offshore/onshore: onshore
- Operator: Türkiye Petrolleri Anonim Ortaklığı

Production
- Current production of oil: 4,000 barrels per day (~2.0×10^{5} t/a)
- Estimated oil in place: 55 million tonnes (~ 60×10^{6} m^{3} or 400 million bbl)

The Raman oil field is an oil field located in Batman, Batman Province, Southeastern Anatolia Region, Turkey. It was discovered in 1940 and later developed by Türkiye Petrolleri Anonim Ortaklığı. It began production in 1948 and produces oil. The total proven reserves of the Raman oil field are around 400 million barrels (55 million tonnes), and production is centered on 4,000 barrels per day (640 m^{3}/d).
