= Batman, Turkey =

Municipality in Batman Province, Turkey

Batman
- Municipality
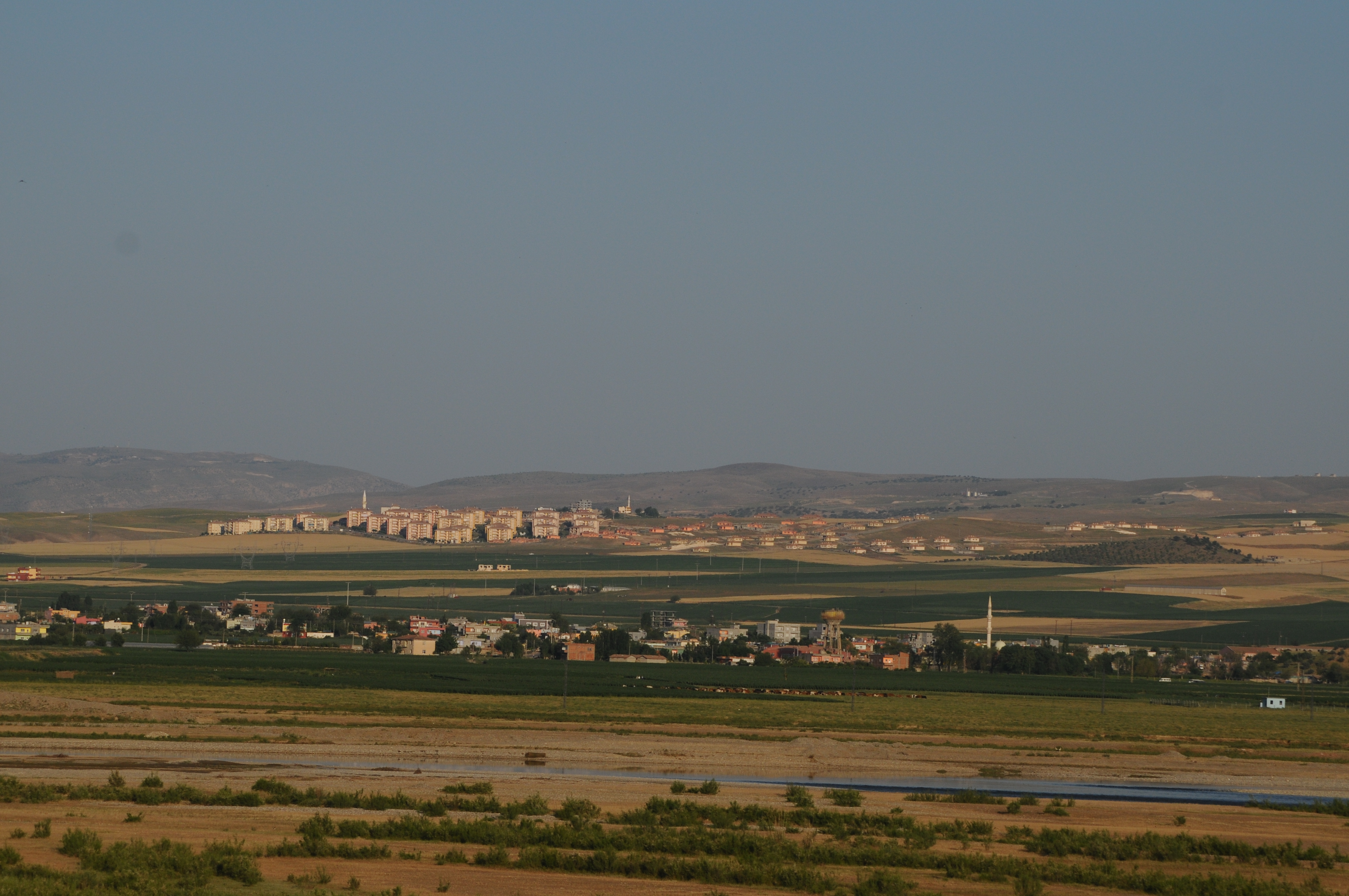

- Coat of arms

- Location within Turkey
- Coordinates: 37.887°N 41.132°E
- Country: Turkey
- Province: Batman
- District: Batman

Government
  - Mayor: Ekrem Canalp (acting)
- Population (2021): 452,157
- Time zone: UTC+3 (TRT)
- Website: www.batman.bel.tr

Batman (Kurdish: Êlih; Syriac: Elīḥā) (Note: Also known as İluh, Eulaha, Eloun, Eléh, Elun, and Eleh.) is a city and capital of Batman District in Batman Province, Turkey. It lies on a plateau, 540 meters (1,772 feet) above sea level, near the confluence of the Batman River and the Tigris and had a population of 452,157 in 2021. It is populated by Kurds and considered to be part of Turkish Kurdistan.

The Batı Raman oil field, which is the largest oil field in Turkey, is located just outside the city. Batman has a local airport and a military airbase, which was used for transit of aircraft and helicopters in some search and rescue operations during the Gulf War.

Until the 1950s, Batman was a village, with a population of about 3,000. However, oil fields were discovered around it in the 1940s that resulted in a rapid development of the area and in the inflow of workforce from other parts of Turkey. In 1957, the village was renamed Batman, after the river namesake, received a city status and became a district center. Over the next 50 years, a significant amount of Batman's one-story buildings were rebuilt as multi-story buildings. As a result, its population grew to many times its previous size. A 511 km (318 mi) km long oil pipeline was built in 1967 from Batman to the port city of Dörtyol near the easternmost point of the Mediterranean coast in order to transport the crude oil from the Batman refinery. In 1990, the city became the capital of Batman Province.

Apart from oil, which is by far the dominant commodity of the region, Batman produces beverages, processed food, chemicals, furniture, footwear, machinery and transport equipment. A university was established in 2007, Batman University, and is part of the Erasmus Programme.

== History ==
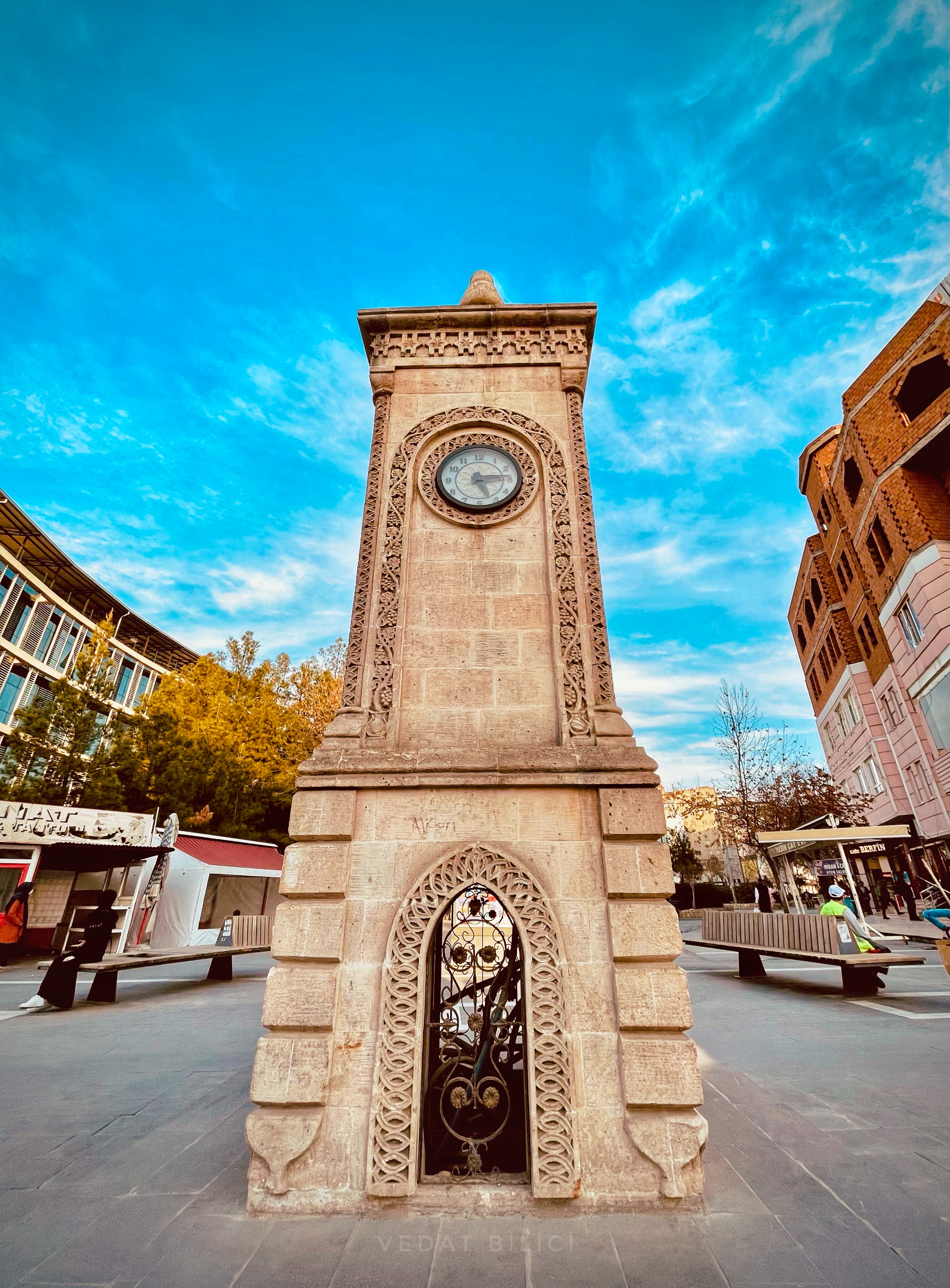
Batman clock tower

Elīḥā (today called Batman) was historically inhabited by Syriac Orthodox Christians and Kurdish-speaking Armenians. In the Syriac Orthodox patriarchal register of dues of 1870, it was recorded that the village had 1 household, who paid 10 dues, and did not have a church or a priest. There were 15 Armenian hearths in 1880. There was an Armenian church of Surb Astvatsatsin. It was located in the kaza (district) of Beşiri in the Diyarbakır sanjak in the Diyarbekir vilayet in c. 1900. It is tentatively identified with the village of Yliga, which was populated by 100 Syriacs in 1914, according to the list presented to the Paris Peace Conference by the Assyro-Chaldean delegation. The Armenians were attacked by the Belek, Bekran, Şegro, and other Kurdish tribes in May 1915 amidst the Armenian genocide.

The village became the capital of a sub-neighbourhood in 1937. It was renamed Batman in 1957 and made a neighbourhood of Siirt Province. It became part of Batman Province upon its formation in 1990. More than 180 civilians were killed in the Batman city area by unidentified gunmen between 1992 and 1993.

=== 21st century ===
In June 2000, the then-Mayor Abdullah Akın attempted to rename up to 200 streets, and give them names of events from Kurdish history or of people who supported Kurdish culture. A Turkish court prohibited the renaming of some streets, but a few other names were allowed to be passed. In 2010, the city was the location for the first Kurdish film festival in Turkey. In the opening ceremony a letter of the imprisoned mayor Nejdet Atalay was read out in the Kurdish language, highlighting the struggles the Kurds have to go through in Turkey, which does not recognise the Kurdish language.

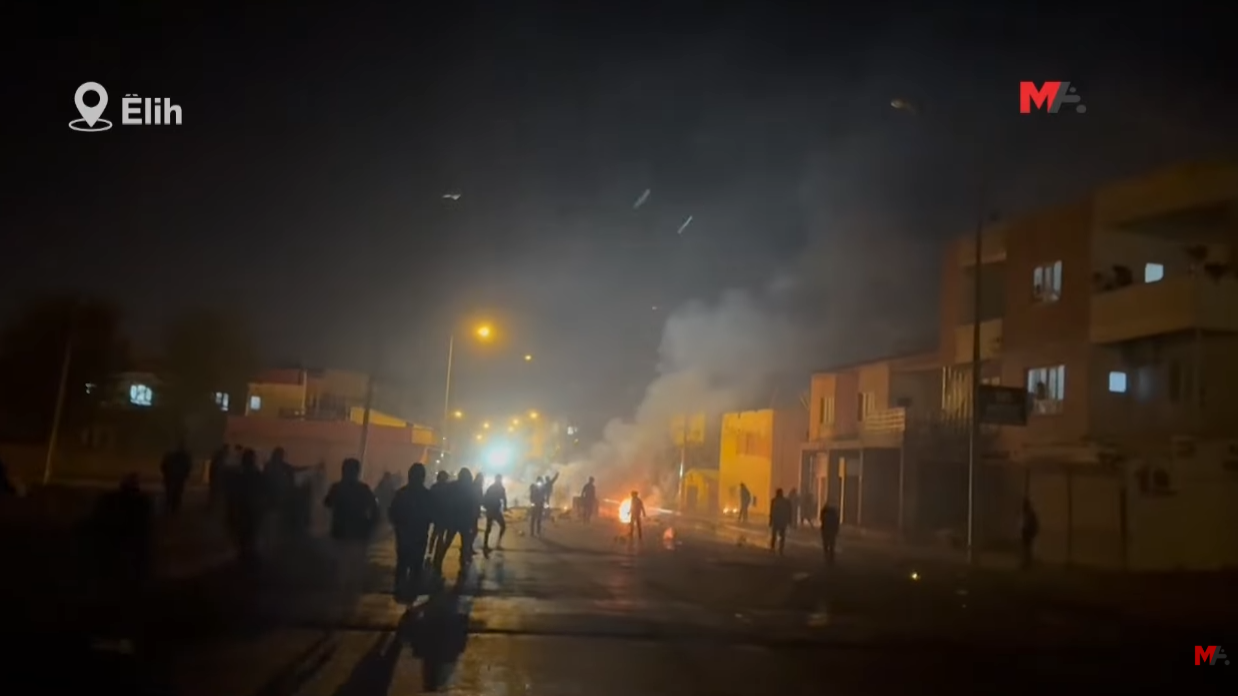
Kurdish youth riots in Batman (Êlih), November 2024.

During the 2014 Kobanî protests, which were part of the broader third phase of the Kurdish–Turkish conflict, local Kurdish youth affiliated with the YDG-H organized popular protests and riots in the city of Batman. This led to the arrest of several individuals, including children, accused of "spreading PKK propaganda." Furthermore, according to Amnesty International, several killings occurred during clashes between Kurdish youth affiliated with the YDG-H on one side, and Turkish police and members of the Sunni Islamist Hüda Par on the other.

In November 2024, following the replacement of pro-Kurdish Peoples' Equality and Democracy (DEM) Party mayors with government-appointed trustees in Batman and several other Kurdish-majority towns, protests and riots erupted in the city.

== Government ==
In the local elections in December 1977, a candidate who openly supported Kurdish rights, Edip Sönmez, won the elections. He was murdered in 1979. The Kurdish Mayors Abdullah Akın (1999–2002), Hüseyin Kalkan (2002–2009) and Nejdet Atalay have all faced prosecutions and were in prison. The former mayor of Batman Nejdet Atalay, was a member of the Democratic Society Party (DTP) until the Constitutional Court of Turkey banned that party on 11 December 2009 for alleged ties to the Kurdistan Workers' Party. This decision banned him and 35 other members of the now-disbanded political party from joining any political party for five years. In 2014, Sabri Özdemir won the elections, but he was suspended as mayor in October 2015 for "self governance" remarks and later dismissed.

In the local elections of March 2019, Mehmet Demir was elected Mayor of Batman, but on 23 February 2020, he was dismissed and a trustee was appointed. The kaymakam is Osman Bilici.

On 4 November, mayors from the pro-Kurdish DEM Party in the cities of Batman, Mardin and Halfeti were replaced with government-appointed administrators.

== Demography ==
According to the national census data collected between 1990 and 2000, the population of Batman is growing at a rate of 5% per year. By 2008, it reached a population of 298,342, with a male to female ratio of 1.015. According to the 2000 census, about 50% of population is married and has about 5 children per family. About 5 people are living together in one house as family. The unemployment rate is about 20% for males and 10% for females. Kurdish is the main first-language in the city.

== Industry ==
Batman's primary commodity is oil, as there are multiple oil fields in the nearby area. These oil fields have spurred the creation of multiple pipelines to transmit oil to and from several important cities. Apart from oil, which is by far the dominant commodity of the region, Batman produces beverages, processed food, chemicals, furniture, footwear, machinery and transport equipment.

=== Oil fields ===
Search for oil in the Batman Province started in 1935. On 20 April 1940, oil was found at a depth of 1,048 metres (3,438 feet) at the Raman oil field, located south-east of Batman. The first experimental well began producing 10 tonnes (about 62 barrels (9.9 m^{3})) of oil per day on 6 June 1940. The field was set to be expanded for commercial production by 1945, but the production was delayed to 1947 due to the lack of storage. To solve this, a small refinery was built at the site with a capacity of 9 tonnes/day in 1947, and in November 1948 a bigger refinery capable of processing up to 200 tonnes/day was completed in Batman. An even bigger refinery (330 tonnes/d) was completed in Batman in 1955. Several other oil fields were discovered later around Batman, the largest being Batı Raman oil field, which produces about 7,000 barrels (1,100 m^{3}) of oil daily.

=== Pipelines ===
A 511 km (318 mi) km long oil pipeline was built in 1967 from Batman to Dörtyol, a port city located near the easternmost point of the Mediterranean coast, to transport the crude oil from the Batman region. The pipeline has an annual capacity of 3.5 million tonnes and was transporting about 20 million barrels (3,200,000 m^{3}) (about 2.7 million tonnes) in the 1990s and about twice less between 2003 and 2007. Another, short pipeline 41 kilometres (25 miles) long connected Batman with Şelmo, which is the location of the second largest oil field in Turkey. It transferred between 1.5 and 0.5 million barrels (79,000 m^{3}) of oil per year between the years of 1990 and 2007. Both pipelines are operated by BOTAŞ.

== Culture ==
=== Education ===
According to the census of 2000, 15% males and 43% females of Batman were categorised as illiterate. Within the literate part, about 33% males and 29% females have not finished secondary school, 3.3% males and 0.9% females had university education, and about 13% males and 3.8% females had completed a high-school or an equivalent program. There are 71 elementary and 12 high schools in Batman.

==== Batman University ====
The city also has a university, Batman University, which was founded on 27 May 2007. It employs about 140 staff members and has the faculties of Science and Letters, Technical Education, and Engineering, which mostly cover topics about engineering, business, and administration. About 2,500 students, who come from different parts of Turkey, study at the university. The university is part of the Erasmus foreign student exchange program.

=== Sport ===
Association football is the most popular sport in Batman. The city has a professional football club, Batman Petrolspor, which was formed in 1960 and plays in the third division TFF 3. Lig. The club was named after the petroleum industry of the city. Another local football team, 72 Batmanspor, participates in the Amateur League. There is a football stadium in Batman, which has a seating capacity of 4,900 spectators.

Another popular sport is wrestling. Freestyle wrestlers from Batman have won national competitions, and Ali Riza Alan won gold in 1970 and silver in 1974 in world championships in the weight category under 52 kg (115 lb). The major sport venue of Batman, Atatürk Sports Hall, can accommodate 1,000 spectators and supports many athletics, such as badminton, basketball, gymnastics, wrestling, folk dance, handball, martial arts (such as kurash, judo, aikido, wushu, karate and taekwondo), table tennis, volleyball and swimming.

== Transportation ==
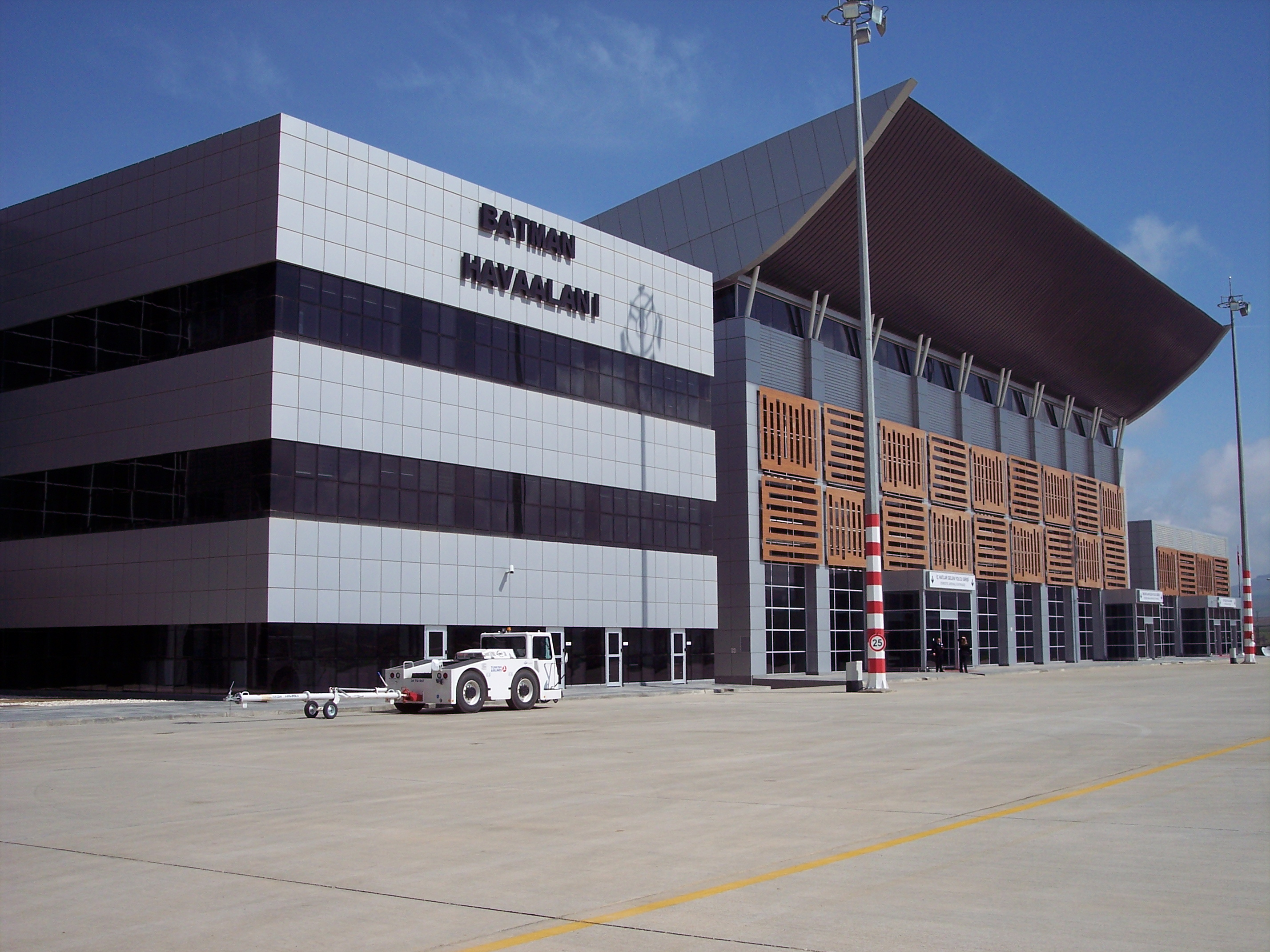
Batman Airport

Batman is connected by highways and railway with the nearby cities of Diyarbakır and Kurtalan and with the capital Ankara. The distance (using highways) to Istanbul is 1,465 km (910 mi), to Ankara 1,012 km (629 mi), and to İzmir 1,520 km (944 mi). There is also a regional airport outside of Batman at 37.929481°N 41.118021°E, which provides direct flights to İzmir, Ankara and Istanbul. The airport is combined with the military Batman Air Base. The base was renovated after the US-Turkey agreement in 1982 to make the base available for US tactical aircraft acting within NATO forces. This allowed them to patrol the region of Caucasus, Turkey and Iran without refueling. The base was then used for aid delivery and rescue missions in Iraq during the 1991 Gulf War.

== Geography ==
Batman is built on a flat plateau elevated at 540 m (1,772 ft) above the sea level, though there is a declining slope of up to 0.6° in the northeastern and southern areas. There are almost no forests in and around the city. The Iluh River, a tributary of the Batman River, flows through the city. The soil mostly consists of soft and porous clay; it is unstable and is easily eroded with rain and floods of the Batman and Iluh rivers. The floods usually occur between March and May, although they sometimes occur between October and November. Major floods occurred in 1969 (April, 60 buildings damaged), 1972 (April and May, 210 buildings damaged), 1991 (November, 500 buildings flooded), 1995 (March, nearly 1000 buildings submerged and 450 damaged) and 2006 (October, 11 people died and 20 injured).

=== Climate ===
Batman has a hot summer Mediterranean climate (Köppen: Csa, Trewartha: Cs). Summers in the city are, on average, one of the hottest in the nation, averaging 30.9 °C (87.6 °F) in July. Rainfall is almost non-existent during the summer months, with many summer months passing by without measurable precipitation. Winters are cool and wet with frosty nights. Snowfall is sporadic between the months of December and March, snowing for a week or two, with a record snow depth of 32.0 cm (12.6 in).

Highest recorded temperature:48.8 °C (119.8 °F) on 10 July 1962
Lowest recorded temperature:−24.0 °C (−11.2 °F) on 1 January 2007

Climate data for Batman (1991–2020, extremes 1959–2023)
Month	Jan	Feb	Mar	Apr	May	Jun	Jul	Aug	Sep	Oct	Nov	Dec	Year
Record high °C (°F)	18.6 (65.5)	24.6 (76.3)	30.6 (87.1)	35.8 (96.4)	42.0 (107.6)	45.1 (113.2)	48.8 (119.8)	46.2 (115.2)	43.8 (110.8)	37.0 (98.6)	28.6 (83.5)	22.6 (72.7)	48.8 (119.8)
Mean daily maximum °C (°F)	8.0 (46.4)	10.9 (51.6)	16.2 (61.2)	21.8 (71.2)	27.8 (82.0)	35.3 (95.5)	39.7 (103.5)	39.6 (103.3)	34.5 (94.1)	27.0 (80.6)	17.0 (62.6)	9.6 (49.3)	23.9 (75.0)
Daily mean °C (°F)	3.1 (37.6)	5.1 (41.2)	9.8 (49.6)	14.6 (58.3)	19.8 (67.6)	26.7 (80.1)	30.9 (87.6)	30.4 (86.7)	25.1 (77.2)	18.4 (65.1)	10.0 (50.0)	4.6 (40.3)	16.5 (61.7)
Mean daily minimum °C (°F)	−1.0 (30.2)	0.2 (32.4)	3.8 (38.8)	7.8 (46.0)	11.6 (52.9)	16.4 (61.5)	20.8 (69.4)	20.4 (68.7)	15.6 (60.1)	10.8 (51.4)	4.2 (39.6)	0.5 (32.9)	9.3 (48.7)
Record low °C (°F)	−24.0 (−11.2)	−22.2 (−8.0)	−17.0 (1.4)	−9.0 (15.8)	0.9 (33.6)	0.0 (32.0)	11.8 (53.2)	11.5 (52.7)	4.4 (39.9)	−3.0 (26.6)	−7.6 (18.3)	−23.0 (−9.4)	−24.0 (−11.2)
Average precipitation mm (inches)	58.3 (2.30)	67.9 (2.67)	77.3 (3.04)	71.3 (2.81)	45.2 (1.78)	9.1 (0.36)	2.3 (0.09)	2.6 (0.10)	6.1 (0.24)	36.1 (1.42)	49.3 (1.94)	67.8 (2.67)	493.6 (19.43)
Average precipitation days	10.17	10.13	11.43	11.03	8.3	2.03	0.53	0.30	1.13	5.73	6.37	10.23	77.4
Average snowy days	2.1	1.5	0.8	0	0	0	0	0	0	0	0.1	0.8	5.3
Average relative humidity (%)	77.4	71.9	66.1	64.8	57.7	39.0	32.2	31.8	36.9	51.5	68.5	78.1	56.1
Mean monthly sunshine hours	98.4	128.6	169.1	215.5	280.1	346.5	368.5	347.5	293.3	217.2	156.7	92.6	2,692.5
Mean daily sunshine hours	3.2	4.6	5.5	7.3	9.0	11.6	11.9	11.2	9.8	7.0	5.3	3.0	7.4
Source 1: Turkish State Meteorological Service
Source 2: NOAA (humidity, sun 1991–2020), Meteomanz(snow days 2008–2023)

== Notable people ==
- İbrahim Bilgen (1949–2010), Kurdish politician
- Nalin Pekgul (b. 1967), Swedish politician
- Yunus Emre Konak (b. 2006), Turkish football player

== Bibliography ==
- Avcıkıran, Adem (2009). Kürtçe Anamnez Anamneza bi Kurmancî (in Turkish and Kurdish).
- Bcheiry, Iskandar (2009). The Syriac Orthodox Patriarchal Register of Dues of 1870: An Unpublished Historical Document from the Late Ottoman Period. Gorgias Press.
- Gaunt, David (2006). Massacres, Resistance, Protectors: Muslim-Christian Relations in Eastern Anatolia during World War I. Gorgias Press.
- Jongerden, Joost; Verheij, Jelle, eds. (2012). Social Relations in Ottoman Diyarbekir, 1870-1915. Brill.
- Kanbak, Ayşegül; Pınarcıoğlu, Nihal Şirin (2019). Urban Poverty in Batman. Ijopec Publication.
- Kévorkian, Raymond H. (2006). "Demographic Changes in the Armenian Population of Diarbekir, 1895-1914". In Richard G. Hovannisian (ed.). Armenian Tigranakert/Diarbekir and Edessa/Urfa. Mazda Publishers.
- Kévorkian, Raymond (2011). The Armenian Genocide: A Complete History. I.B. Tauris.
- Koçer, Suncem (2014). "Kurdish cinema as a transnational discourse genre: Cinematic visibility, cultural resilience and political agency". International Journal of Middle East Studies. 46 (3). doi:10.1017/S0020743814000555. ISSN 0020-7438. JSTOR 43303181. S2CID 145602322.
- Orhan, Mehmet (16 October 2015). Political Violence and Kurds in Turkey: Fragmentations, Mobilizations, Participations & Repertoires. Routledge. ISBN 978-1-317-42044-6.
- Rugman, Jonathan; Hutchings, Roger (2001). Ataturk's Children: Turkey and the Kurds. Continuum International Publishing Group. ISBN 978-0-8264-5490-4.
- Şenol Balaban, Meltem (2009). Risk society and planning: the case of flood disaster management in Turkish cities (PDF) (Thesis).
- Watts, Nicole F. (1 July 2011). Activists in Office: Kurdish Politics and Protest in Turkey. University of Washington Press. ISBN 978-0-295-80082-0.
- Yilmaz, Özcan (26 November 2015). La formation de la nation kurde en Turquie (in French). Graduate Institute Publications. ISBN 978-2-940549-28-3.
