= Southeastern Anatolia region =

Coordinates: 37°00′N 40°00′E

Southeastern Anatolia region Güneydoğu Anadolu Bölgesi
- Region
- Country: Turkey

Area
  - Total: 59,176 km^{2} (22,848 sq mi)

Population
  - Total: 8,576,391
  - Density: 144.93/km^{2} (375.37/sq mi)

GDP
  - Total: US$ 44.745 billion (2022)
  - Per capita: US$ 5,220 (2022)
- HDI (2022): 0.805 very high · 11th

The Southeastern Anatolia region (Turkish: Güneydoğu Anadolu Bölgesi) is a geographical region of Turkey. The most populous city in the region is Gaziantep. Other big cities are Şanlıurfa, Diyarbakır, Mardin and Adıyaman.

It is bordered by the Mediterranean region to the west, the Eastern Anatolia region to the north, Syria to the south, and Iraq to the southeast.

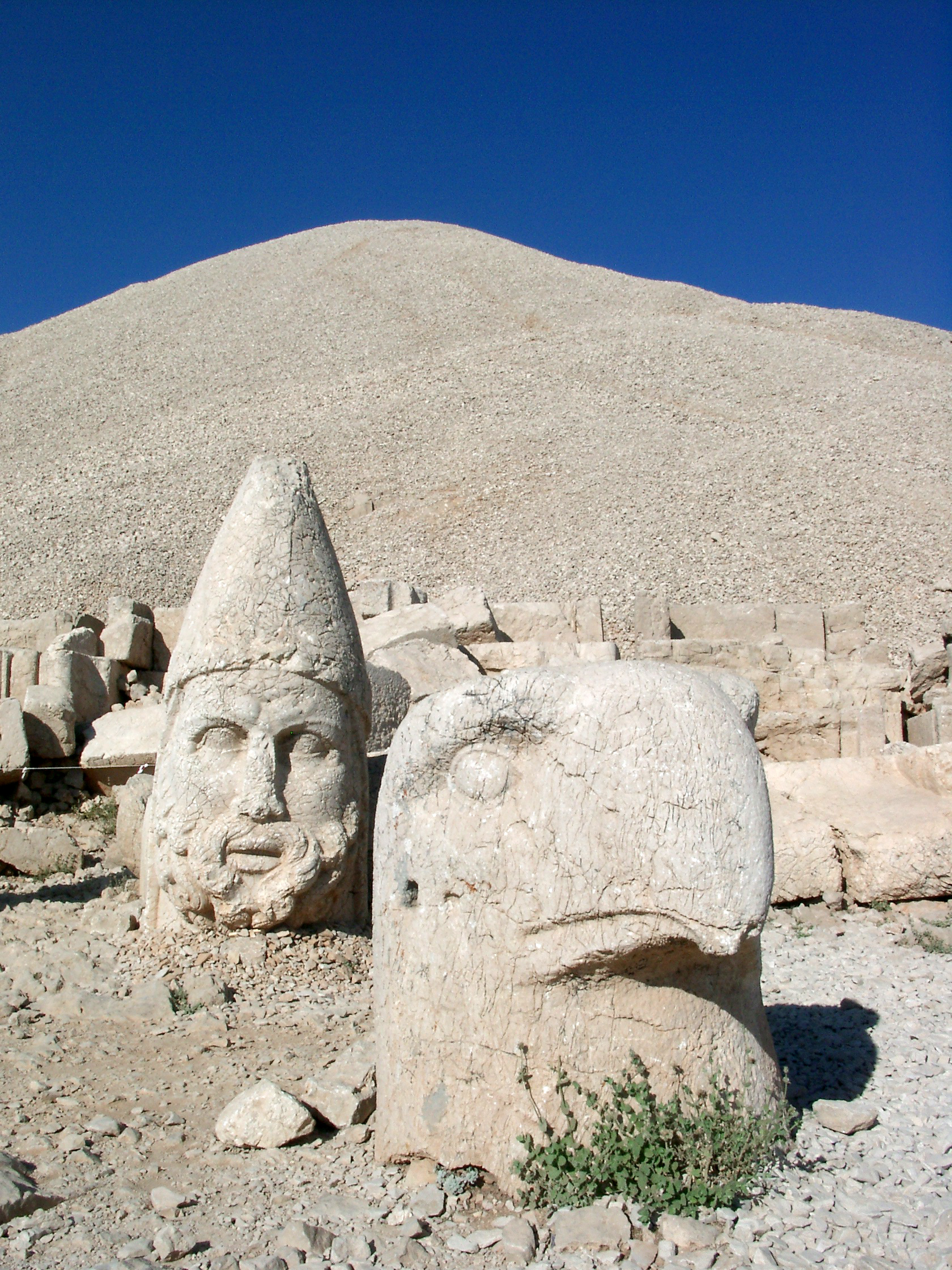
Mount Nemrut, Kâhta, Adıyaman

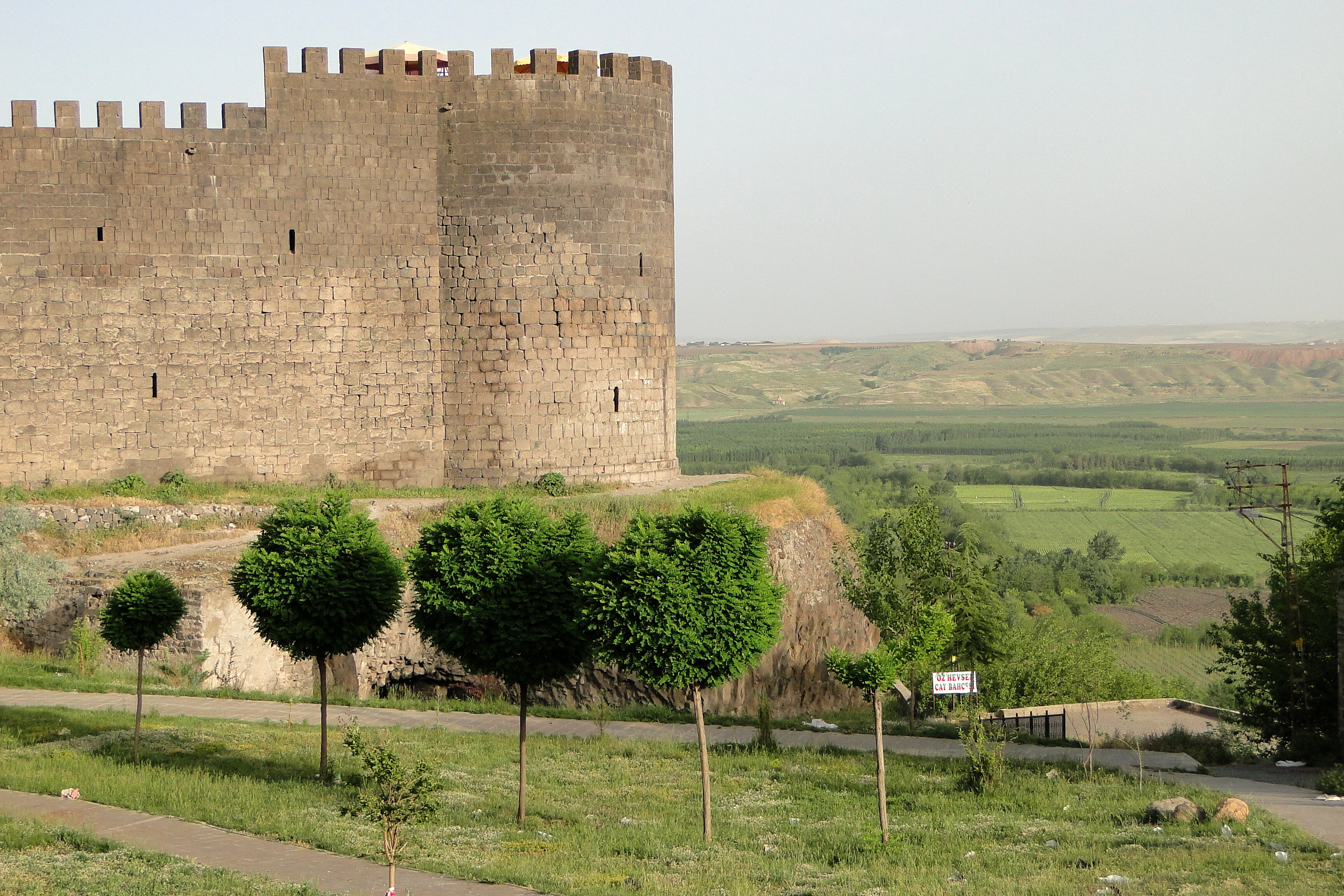
Diyarbakır Fortress

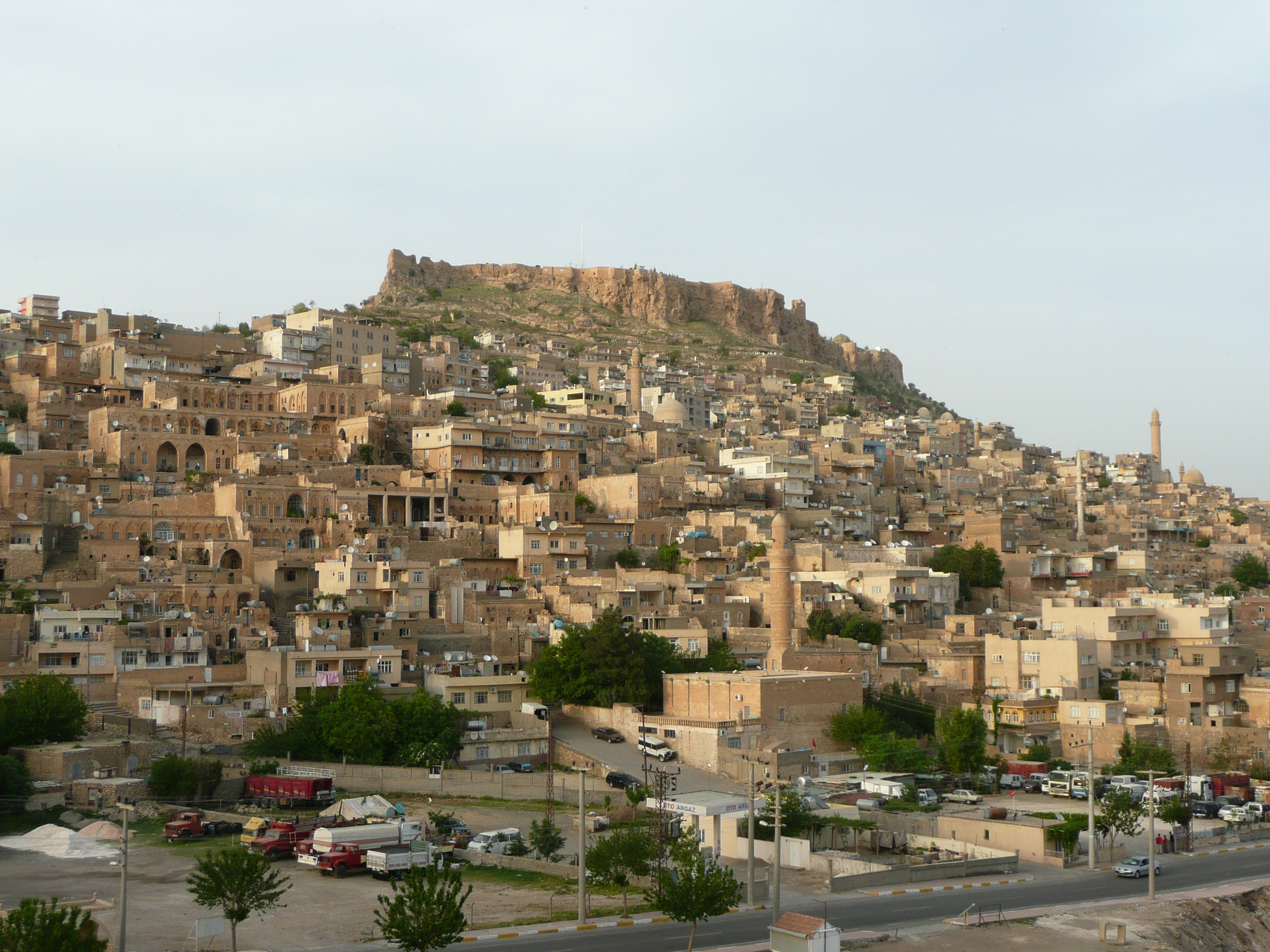
Old Mardin

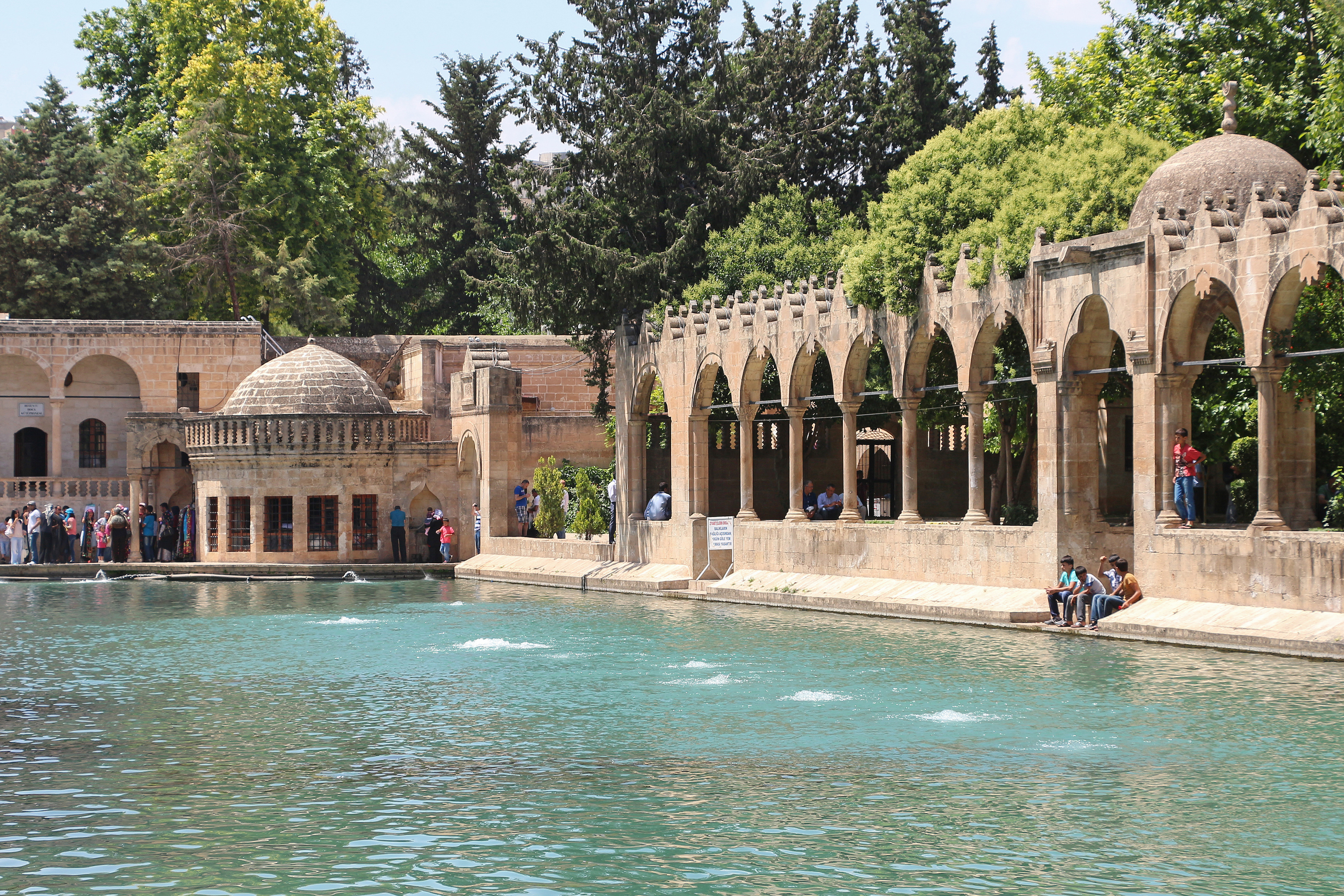
Balıklıgöl

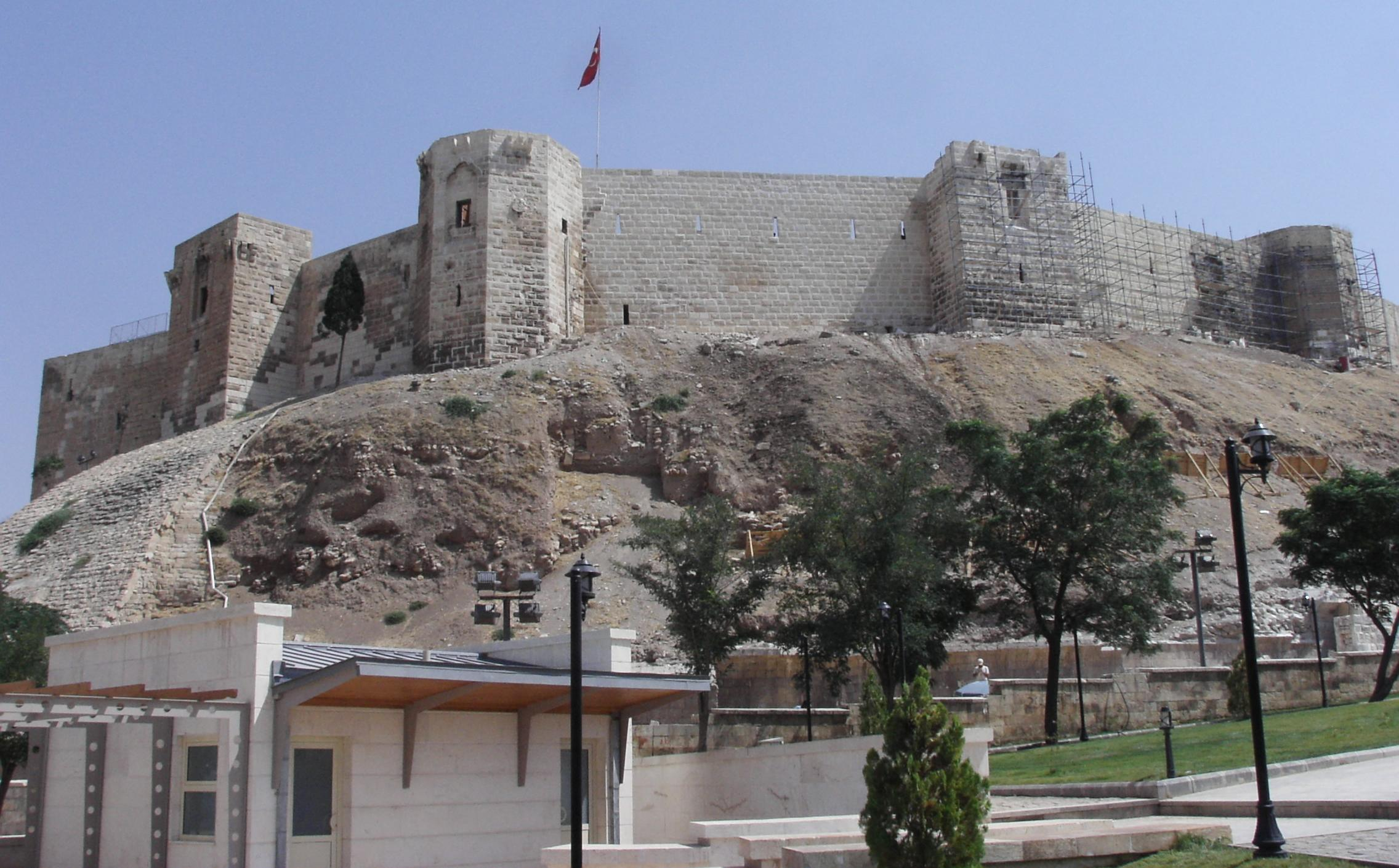
Gaziantep Castle

== Subdivision ==
- Middle Euphrates section (Turkish: Orta Fırat Bölümü)
  - Gaziantep area (Turkish: Gaziantep Yöresi)
  - Şanlıurfa area (Turkish: Şanlıurfa Yöresi)
- Tigris section (Turkish: Dicle Bölümü)
  - Diyarbakır area (Turkish: Diyarbakır Yöresi)
  - Mardin–Midyat area (Turkish: Mardin - Midyat Yöresi)

== Ecoregions ==
=== Palearctic ===
==== Temperate broadleaf and mixed forests ====
- Eastern Anatolian deciduous forests
- Zagros Mountains forest steppe

==== Temperate grasslands, savannas and shrublands ====
- Eastern Anatolian montane steppe

=== Mediterranean forests, woodlands, and scrub ===
- Eastern Mediterranean conifer-sclerophyllous-broadleaf forests

== Provinces ==
Provinces that are entirely in the Southeastern Anatolia region:

- Mardin
- Şanlıurfa

Provinces that are mostly in the Southeastern Anatolia region:

- Adıyaman
- Batman
- Diyarbakır
- Gaziantep
- Siirt

Provinces that are partially in the Southeastern Anatolia region:

- Bitlis
- Bingöl
- Kahramanmaraş
- Kilis
- Malatya

== Geography and climate ==
The Southeastern Anatolia region has an area of 59,176 km^{2} and is the second smallest region of Turkey. It has a semi-arid continental climate with very hot and dry summers and cold and often snowy winters.

== Tourism ==
- Tourism information is available in English at the Southeastern Anatolian Promotion Project site.

== See also ==
- Provinces of Turkey
- Upper Mesopotamia
- Fertile Crescent
- Tur Abdin
- Southeastern Anatolia Project
