= List of populated places in Batman Province =

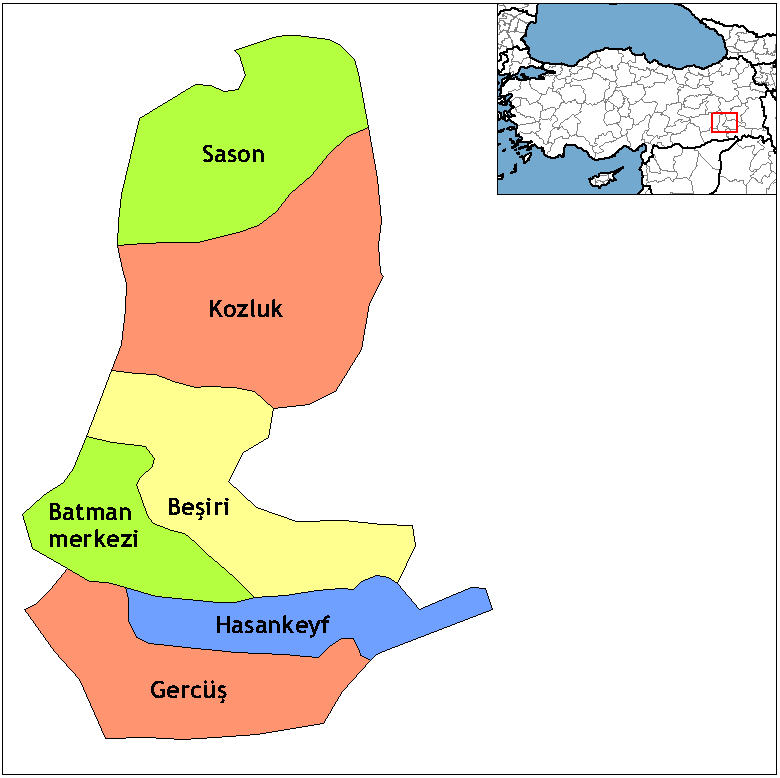
Batman Province

Below is the list of populated places in Batman Province, Turkey, by district. The first entry in each list is the administrative center of the district.

== Batman ==
- Batman
- Akça, Batman
- Aydınkonak, Batman
- Balpınar, Batman
- Bayraklı, Batman
- Bıçakçı, Batman
- Binatlı, Batman
- Çarıklı, Batman
- Çayüstü, Batman
- Demirbilek, Batman
- Demirlipınar, Batman
- Demiryol, Batman
- Doluca, Batman
- Erköklü, Batman
- Güneşli, Batman
- Güvercin, Batman
- İkiztepe, Batman
- Karayün, Batman
- Kayabağı, Batman
- Kesmeköprü, Batman
- Kösetarla, Batman
- Kuyubaşı, Batman
- Oymataş, Batman
- Recepler, Batman
- Suçeken, Batman
- Yağmurlu, Batman
- Yakıtlı, Batman
- Yaylıca, Batman
- Yediyol, Batman
- Yeniköy, Batman
- Yeşilöz, Batman
- Yolağzı, Batman
- Yolveren, Batman

== Beşiri ==
- Beşiri
- Alaca, Beşiri
- Asmadere, Beşiri
- Atbağı, Beşiri
- Ayrancı, Beşiri
- Bahçeli, Beşiri
- Başarı, Beşiri
- Beşpınar, Beşiri
- Beyçayırı, Beşiri
- Bilek, Beşiri
- Çakıllı, Beşiri
- Çavuşbayırı, Beşiri
- Çevrimova, Beşiri
- Çığırlı, Beşiri
- Dağyolu, Beşiri
- Danalı, Beşiri
- Dayılar, Beşiri
- Değirmenüstü, Beşiri
- Deveboynu, Beşiri
- Doğankavak, Beşiri
- Doğanpazarı, Beşiri
- Durucak, Beşiri
- Esence, Beşiri
- Eskihamur, Beşiri
- Güvercinlik, Beşiri
- Ilıca, Beşiri
- Işıkveren, Beşiri
- İkiköprü, Beşiri
- İkiyaka, Beşiri
- İnpınar, Beşiri
- Kaşüstü, Beşiri
- Kayatepe, Beşiri
- Kumçay, Beşiri
- Kumgeçit, Beşiri
- Kurukavak, Beşiri
- Kuşçukuru, Beşiri
- Kütüklü, Beşiri
- Oğuz, Beşiri
- Otluca, Beşiri
- Örmegöze, Beşiri
- Samanlı, Beşiri
- Tepecik, Beşiri
- Uğurca, Beşiri
- Üçkuyular, Beşiri
- Yakacık, Beşiri
- Yalınca, Beşiri
- Yalınkavak, Beşiri
- Yarımtaş, Beşiri
- Yazıhan, Beşiri
- Yenipınar, Beşiri
- Yeniyol, Beşiri
- Yeşiloba, Beşiri
- Yolkonak, Beşiri
- Yontukyazı, Beşiri

== Gercüş ==
- Gercüş
- Akburç, Gercüş
- Akyar, Gercüş
- Ardıç, Gercüş
- Ardıçlı, Gercüş
- Arıca, Gercüş
- Aydınca, Gercüş
- Aydınlı, Gercüş
- Bağlıca, Gercüş
- Bağözü, Gercüş
- Başarköy, Gercüş
- Başova, Gercüş
- Boğazköy, Gercüş
- Çalışkan, Gercüş
- Çiçekli, Gercüş
- Çukuryurt, Gercüş
- Dereiçi, Gercüş
- Dereli, Gercüş
- Doruk, Gercüş
- Düzmeşe, Gercüş
- Eymir, Gercüş
- Geçit, Gercüş
- Gökçe, Gercüş
- Gökçepınar, Gercüş
- Gönüllü, Gercüş
- Gürbüz, Gercüş
- Güzelöz, Gercüş
- Hisar, Gercüş
- Kantar, Gercüş
- Karalan, Gercüş
- Kayalar, Gercüş
- Kayapınar, Gercüş
- Kesiksu, Gercüş
- Kırkat, Gercüş
- Kışlak, Gercüş
- Koçak, Gercüş
- Koyunlu, Gercüş
- Kozlu, Gercüş
- Kömürcü, Gercüş
- Kutlu, Gercüş
- Nurlu, Gercüş
- Özler, Gercüş
- Poyraz, Gercüş
- Rüzgarlı, Gercüş
- Sargın, Gercüş
- Seki, Gercüş
- Serinköy, Gercüş
- Taşçı, Gercüş
- Tepecik, Gercüş
- Ulaş, Gercüş
- Vergili, Gercüş
- Yakıtlı, Gercüş
- Yamanlar, Gercüş
- Yassıca, Gercüş
- Yayladüzü, Gercüş
- Yemişli, Gercüş
- Yenice, Gercüş
- Yolağzı, Gercüş
- Yüceköy, Gercüş

== Hasankeyf ==
- Hasankeyf
- Akalın, Hasankeyf
- Aksu, Hasankeyf
- Bayırlı, Hasankeyf
- Büyükdere, Hasankeyf
- Çardaklı, Hasankeyf
- Irmak, Hasankeyf
- İncirli, Hasankeyf
- Karaköy, Hasankeyf
- Kumluca, Hasankeyf
- Öğütlü, Hasankeyf
- Saklı, Hasankeyf
- Soğucak, Hasankeyf
- Tepebaşı, Hasankeyf
- Uzundere, Hasankeyf
- Üçyol, Hasankeyf
- Yakaköy, Hasankeyf
- Yolüstü, Hasankeyf

== Kozluk ==
- Kozluk
- Akçakışla, Kozluk
- Akçalı, Kozluk
- Alıçlı, Kozluk
- Arıkaya, Kozluk
- Armutlu, Kozluk
- Aşağıkıratlı, Kozluk
- Bekirhan, Kozluk
- Beşkonak, Kozluk
- Beybağı, Kozluk
- Bölükkonak, Kozluk
- Çamlıca, Kozluk
- Çaygeçit, Kozluk
- Çayhan, Kozluk
- Çayönü, Kozluk
- Çevrecik, Kozluk
- Danagözü, Kozluk
- Dere, Kozluk
- Derince, Kozluk
- Dövecik, Kozluk
- Duygulu, Kozluk
- Eskice, Kozluk
- Geçitaltı, Kozluk
- Geyikli, Kozluk
- Güllüce, Kozluk
- Gümüşörgü, Kozluk
- Gündüzlü, Kozluk
- Günyayla, Kozluk
- Gürpınar, Kozluk
- İnişli, Kozluk
- Kaletepe, Kozluk
- Kamışlı, Kozluk
- Karaoğlak, Kozluk
- Karpuzlu, Kozluk
- Karşıyaka, Kozluk
- Kavakdibi, Kozluk
- Kayadibi, Kozluk
- Koçaklar, Kozluk
- Konaklı, Kozluk
- Kulludere, Kozluk
- Kumlupınar, Kozluk
- Ortaca, Kozluk
- Ortaçay, Kozluk
- Oyuktaş, Kozluk
- Örensu, Kozluk
- Parmakkapı, Kozluk
- Pınarhisar, Kozluk
- Samanyolu, Kozluk
- Seyitler, Kozluk
- Seyrantepe, Kozluk
- Taşlıdere, Kozluk
- Taşlık, Kozluk
- Tosunpınar, Kozluk
- Tuzlagözü, Kozluk
- Ulaşlı, Kozluk
- Uzunçayır, Kozluk
- Uzunyazı, Kozluk
- Ünsaldı, Kozluk
- Yanıkkaya, Kozluk
- Yankılı, Kozluk
- Yapaklı, Kozluk
- Yayalar, Kozluk
- Yazılı, Kozluk
- Yazpınar, Kozluk
- Yedibölük, Kozluk
- Yeniçağlar, Kozluk
- Yenidağan, Kozluk
- Yenidoğan, Kozluk
- Yıldızlı, Kozluk
- Yukarıkıratlı, Kozluk
- Ziyaret, Kozluk

== Sason ==
- Sason
- Acar, Sason
- Altındere, Sason
- Aydınlık, Sason
- Balbaşı, Sason
- Binekli, Sason
- Cevizli, Sason
- Çağlı, Sason
- Çakırpınar, Sason
- Çalışırlar, Sason
- Çayırlı, Sason
- Çınarlı, Sason
- Dağçatı, Sason
- Dereiçi, Sason
- Dereköy, Sason
- Derince, Sason
- Dikbayır, Sason
- Dörtbölük, Sason
- Ergünü, Sason
- Erikli, Sason
- Geçitli, Sason
- Günlüce, Sason
- Gürgenli, Sason
- Güvercinlik, Sason
- Heybeli, Sason
- İncesu, Sason
- Kaleyolu, Sason
- Karameşe, Sason
- Kaşyayla, Sason
- Kavaklı, Sason
- Kayadüzü, Sason
- Kelhasan, Sason
- Kınalı, Sason
- Kilimli, Sason
- Koçkaya, Sason
- Köprübaşı, Sason
- Meşeli, Sason
- Örenağıl, Sason
- Sarıyayla, Sason
- Soğanlı, Sason
- Taşyuva, Sason
- Umurlu, Sason
- Yakabağ, Sason
- Yeniköy, Sason
- Yiğitler, Sason
- Yolüstü, Sason
- Yuvalar, Sason
- Yücebağ, Sason
- Yürekli, Sason
