= Gülistan Sönük =

Turkish politician of Kurdish origin

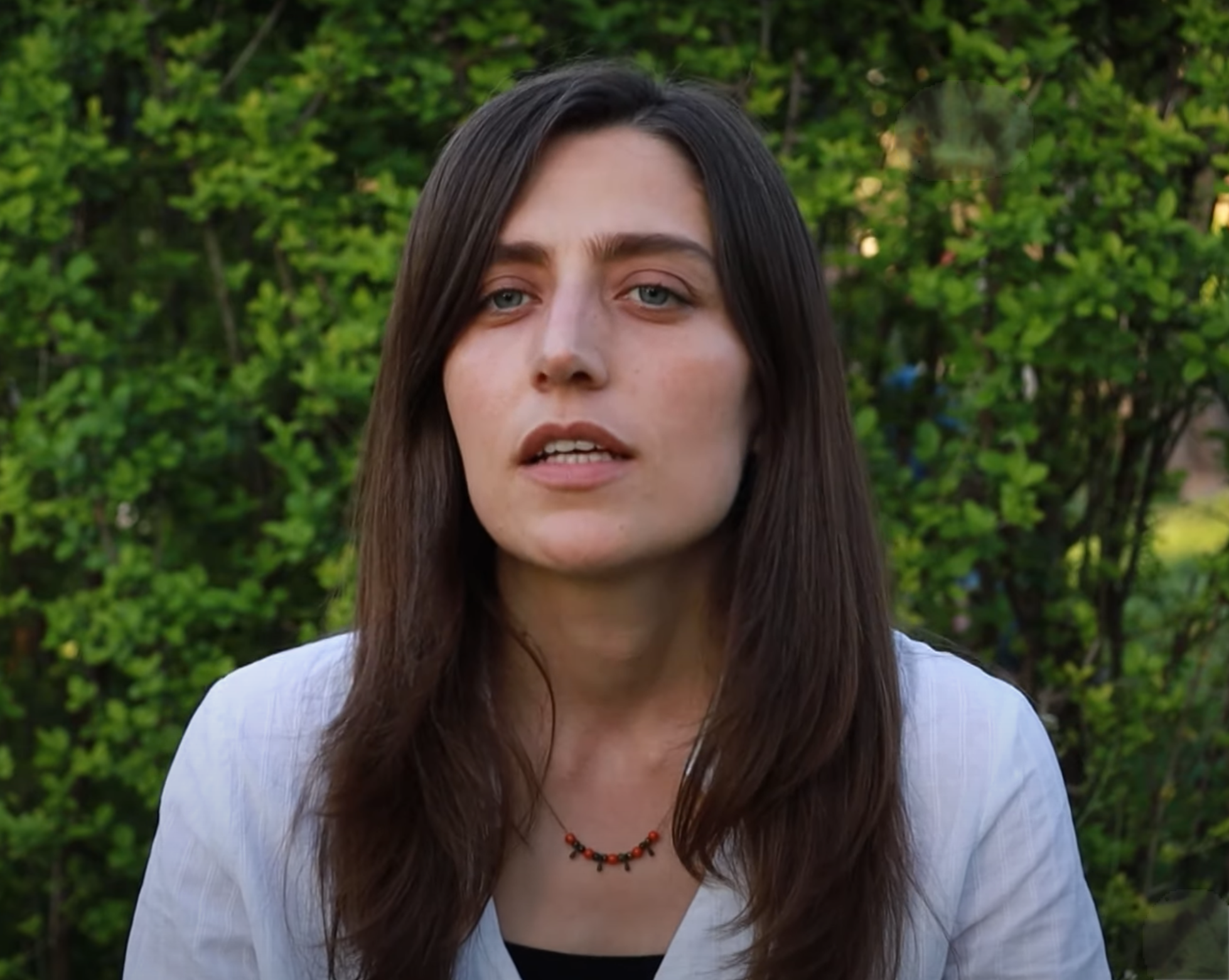
Gülistan Sönük

Gülistan Sönük (b. 1993) is a Turkish Kurd politician who was elected as the co-mayor of Batman in the 2024 Local Elections. She is the first female co-mayor of Batman Municipality.

== Biography ==
She was born in 1993 in Kozluk. After completing her university education in Political Science and International Relations, she entered politics. In 2019, she was elected as the co-mayor of Bekirhan, a town in Kozluk District.
