= Abdullah Beğik =

Kurdish activist

- Mele Evdilayê Timoqî
- Born: 1889; Gümüşörgü, Kozluk, Ottoman Empire
- Died: February 2, 1992 (aged 102-103); Al-Hasakah, Syria
- Burial place: Al-Hasakah, Syria
- Education: Local madrasahs
- Occupations: Imam, Islamic scholar, cleric, and activist
- Organization: Kurdistan Workers' Party
- Title: Seyda
- Children: 6 sons, 5 daughters

Abdullah Beğik, better known as Mullah Abdullah Timoqi (Kurdish: Mele Evdilayê Timoqî), was a Kurdish activist, cleric, Islamic scholar, and imam, who became associated with Abdullah Öcalan in the later years of his life. He was and still is titled Seyda (meaning "teacher" or "master" in Kurdish) by his devotees.

== Biography ==
Timoqi was born in 1889 in the village of Gümüşörgü (Kurdish: Timoq). He studied at a madrasah and lived an ordinary life until Turkey was formed in 1923. He was targeted by the Turkish state many times because he repeatedly defied them, and continued to give khutbahs in Kurdish, and refused to include Turkish nationalism in the mosques he served. Because of the 1934 Surname Law, he was legally required to take the surname Beğik, although he refused to identify with that surname. He was arrested and tortured many times before 1940, and was arrested after each of the 1960, 1971, and 1980 coups. The HRK wing of the PKK later reached the Kozluk region, where Timoqi lived. Despite being at differences with the PKK due to their doctrine and ideology, he praised their efforts for Kurdistan and considered them much better than Turkey, and therefore offered the militants shelter in his house. The house was raided after a while by Turkish forces, coincidentally when Timoqi was outside. Timoqi immediately crossed the border into Syrian Kurdistan in 1985, and settled there while occasionally visiting Beqaa Valley in Lebanon. He lived in the Mahsum Korkmaz Academy for many days, and was always highly respected by the PKK militants and leaders. He became close with Abdullah Öcalan and became a mentor to him. He also gave Öcalan lessons about Islam, which contributed to Öcalan softening his stance on religion. He died at a hospital in Al-Hasakah on February 2, 1992, at the age of 102 or 103 years, and was buried there. He had 6 sons and 5 daughters. During Timoqi's later years, Öcalan became his caretaker and helped him with basic tasks that he couldn't do because of his frail body, such as laying his prayer rug down for him.

He advocated for an independent Kurdistan, not for better status for Kurds as Turkish citizens, nor for the restoration of the Ottoman Empire. Before his death, he told Abdullah Öcalan that he wanted to "live a little more and see the independent Kurdistan", in which Öcalan assured him that Kurdish independence is imminent. During Timoqi's funeral, Öcalan referred to him as "the pedigree of independence" and urged Kurdish militants to dedicate their future victories to Timoqi, and to remember Timoqi after the establishment of Kurdistan. Öcalan later stated that Timoqi "was a very beautiful person who protected his soul cleanly, did not get involved in the dirt that is the Turkish Republic, and did not get involved in their polluted values of Islam", referring to the addition of Turkish nationalism into Islam, as well as the Turkification of Islam which was done by Diyanet. Öcalan, while speaking about Timoqi, also said "I don't think there is an elder that I love as much as him."

== Legacy ==
The municipality of Batman sparked controversy after it briefly named a 2,500-acre public park, in the Yeşiltepe neighbourhood of Batman, after Timoqi.
