= Ulaşlı (disambiguation) =

Ulaşlı is a village in the Qubadli Rayon of Azerbaijan.

Ulaşlı may also refer to the following settlements in Turkey:

- Ulaşlı, Kızıltepe, a neighbourhood in Mardin Province
- Ulaşlı, Kozluk, a village in Batman Province
- Ulaşlı, Oğuzeli, a neighbourhood in Gaziantep Province

== See also ==
- Ulaşlı Şıxlı, a village in Goychay Rayon, Azerbaijan
