= Gündüzlü =

Gündüzlü can refer to:

- Gündüzlü, İnegöl
- Gündüzlü, Kozluk
