= Büyükdere =

Büyükdere is a Turkish word meaning "big creek" and may refer to:

== Places ==
- Büyükdere, Hasankeyf, a village in the Hasankeyf district of Batman Province, Turkey
- Büyükdere, Koçarlı, a village in the Koçarlı district of Aydın Province, Turkey
- Büyükdere, Pasinler
- Büyükdere, Pazaryolu
- Büyükdere, Sarıyer, a quarter of Sarıyer district in Istanbul Province, Turkey
- Büyükdere Avenue, a major street in the European part of Istanbul, Turkey

== Other uses ==
- TCG Büyükdere (P-128), a former minesweeper of the Turkish Navy
