= Altındere =

Altındere may refer to:

== Surname ==
- Halil Altındere (born 1971), Turkish contemporary artist
- Hasret Altındere (born 1980), Turkish women's footballer

== Places ==
- Altındere, Sason, a village in Sason district of Batman Province, Turkey
- Altındere Valley National Park, a national park in Maçka district of Trabzon Province, Turkey
