= Çevrecik =

Çevrecik can refer to:

- Çevrecik, Arıcak
- Çevrecik, Kozluk
- Çevrecik, Yapraklı
