= Dörtbölük =

Dörtbölük can refer to:

- Dörtbölük, Sason
- Dörtbölük, Sivrice
