= Yenidoğan =

Yenidoğan (Turkish: "newborn") may refer to the following places in Turkey:

- Yenidoğan, Aralık, a village in the district of Aralık, Iğdır Province
- Yenidoğan, Kozluk, a village in the district of Kozluk, Batman Province
- Yenidoğan, Polatlı, a village in the district of Polatlı, Ankara Province
- Yenidoğan, Silvan
- Yenidoğan, Söke, a town in the district of Söke, Aydın Province
- Yenidoğan, Sur
