= Duygulu =

Duygulu can refer to:

- Duygulu, Kozluk
- Duygulu, Sivrice
