= Kurdo =

Kurdo may refer to:

- Kurdo (rapper) (born 1988), German rapper of Iraqi Kurdish origin
- Kurdo Baksi, (born 1965), Swedish social commentator, author, journalist and activist
- Qanate Kurdo (1909–1985), Soviet Kurdish writer, linguist and academic
