= Kelekçi, Hasankeyf =

Village in Batman Province, Turkey

Kelekçi
- Village
- Location within Turkey
- Coordinates: 37.709°N 41.768°E
- Country: Turkey
- Province: Batman
- District: Hasankeyf
- Population (2021): 43
- Time zone: UTC+3 (TRT)

Kelekçi (Kurdish: Miwêlê; Syriac: Mawālī) is a village in the Hasankeyf District of Batman Province in Turkey. The village is populated by Kurds of the Erebiyan tribe and had a population of 43 in 2021. It is located in the historic region of Tur Abdin.

== History ==
Mawālī (today called Kelekçi) was historically inhabited by Syriac Orthodox Christians. In the Syriac Orthodox patriarchal register of dues of 1870, it was recorded that the village had 3 households, who paid 12 dues, and did not have a church or a priest.

== Bibliography ==
- Bcheiry, Iskandar (2009). The Syriac Orthodox Patriarchal Register of Dues of 1870: An Unpublished Historical Document from the Late Ottoman Period. Gorgias Press.
- Tan, Altan (2018). Turabidin'den Berriye'ye. Aşiretler - Dinler - Diller - Kültürler (in Turkish). ISBN 9789944360944.
