= Karayün, Sason =

Village in Batman Province, Turkey

Karayün
- Village
- Location within Turkey
- Coordinates: 38.403°N 41.585°E
- Country: Turkey
- Province: Batman
- District: Sason
- Population (2021): 148
- Time zone: UTC+3 (TRT)

Karayün is a village in the Sason District, Batman Province, Turkey. The village is populated by Arabs and had a population of 148 in 2021.

The hamlet of Karaağaç is attached to the village.
