= Binekli, Sason =

Settlement in Batman Province, Turkey

Binekli
- Neighbourhood
- Location in Turkey
- Coordinates: 38.403°N 41.302°E
- Country: Turkey
- Province: Batman
- District: Sason
- Municipality: Yücebağ
- Population (2021): 193
- Time zone: UTC+3 (TRT)

Binekli (Kurdish: Sînor) is a neighbourhood of the town of Yücebağ, Sason District, Batman Province, Turkey. The quarter is populated by Kurds of the Xiyan tribe and had a population of 193 in 2021.
