= Nalin Pekgul =

Swedish politician (born 1967)

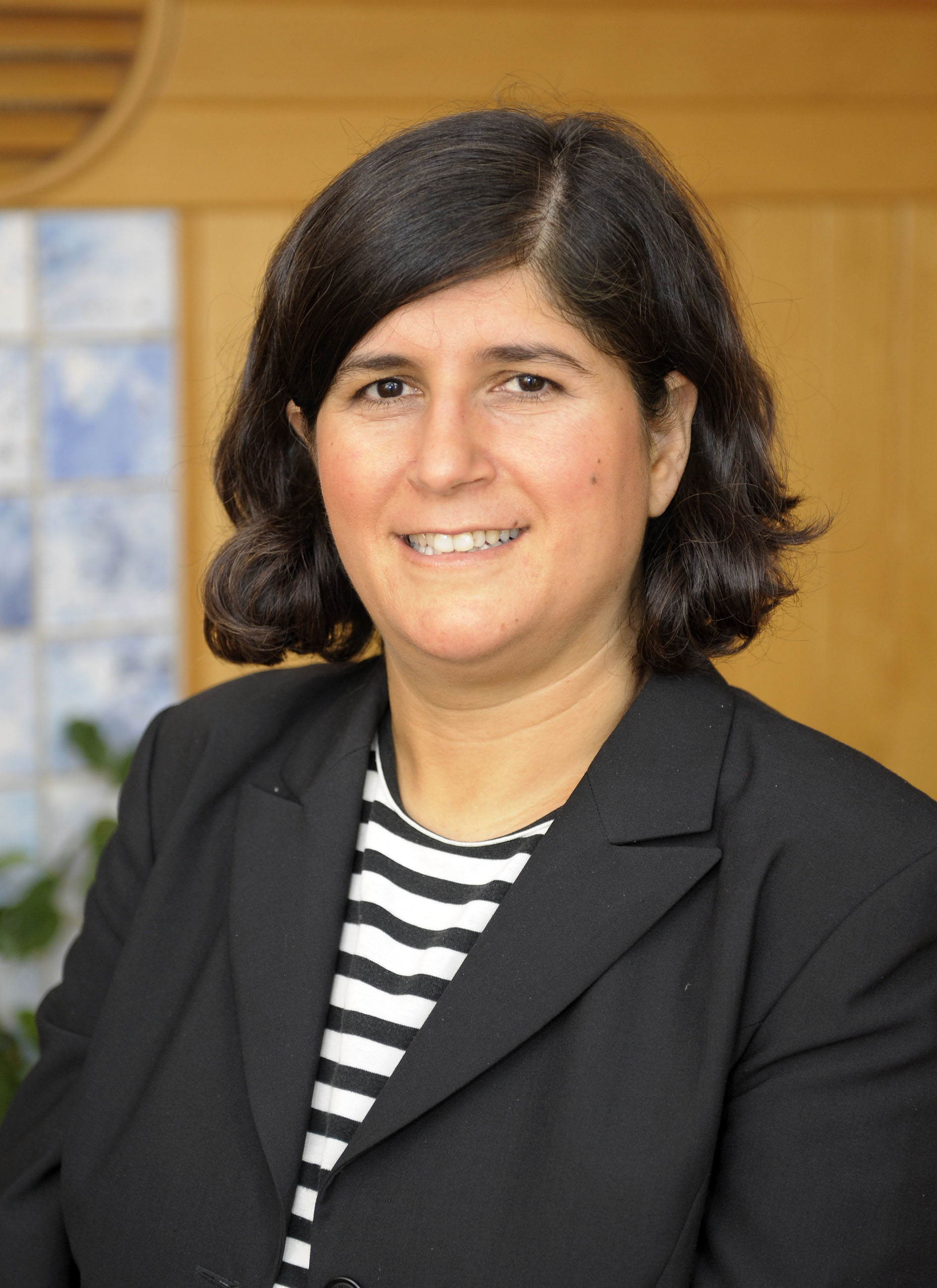
- Pekgul in 2007
- Born: 30 April 1967 (age 59); Batman, Turkey
- Occupation: Politician
- Years active: 1994–present
- Known for: Former member of the Swedish parliament
- Political party: Social Democratic
- Spouse: Cheko Pekgul

Nalin Baksi (formerly known as Pekgul, born 30 April 1967) is a Swedish Social Democratic politician, nurse and former parliamentarian. She was the first Muslim woman to sit in the Swedish Parliament.

== Life ==
Pekgul was born to Kurdish parents in Batman, Turkey, but migrated to Sweden with her family in 1980 when she was 13. She is the sister of the Kurdish nationalist and anti-racism activist Kurdo Baksi and niece of the author Mahmud Baksi. Pekgul trained as a nurse, a profession in which she worked both before and after her election as a politician.

== Political activities ==
In 1982, Pekgul joined the Swedish Social Democratic Youth League in Tensta, a suburb of Stockholm.

Between 1994 and 2002, Pekgul was a member of the Swedish parliament. She was chairwoman of Social Democratic Women in Sweden (Swedish: Sveriges socialdemokratiska kvinnoförbund) 2003–2011. Aftonbladet noted that Pekgul was the first Muslim woman to be elected to the Swedish parliament.

Pekgul has supported a progressive form of Islam and ideas of Islamic feminism. She supports the Swedish monarchy and has argued that the Social Democrats should remove calls for a republic from their party programme.

After an absence from Swedish politics of seven years, Pekgul announced in 2018 that she would make a political comeback to campaign against religious extremism and honour culture. She campaigned in Gothenburg with Ann-Sofie Hermansson, chairman of the municipal council. She told Aftonbladet that it is the fight against the Sweden Democrats that engages her. The Social Democrats have been criticised for not raising issues of honour violence for fear of losing votes.
