= Ekinlik, Sason =

Village in Batman Province, Turkey

Ekinlik
- Village
- Location within Turkey
- Coordinates: 38.390°N 41.499°E
- Country: Turkey
- Province: Batman
- District: Sason
- Population (2021): 178
- Time zone: UTC+3 (TRT)

Ekinlik is a village in the Sason District, Batman Province, Turkey. The village is populated by Arabs and had a population of 178 in 2021.

The hamlet of Akyemiş is attached to the village.
