= Kulaksız, Sason =

Village in Batman Province, Turkey

Kulaksız
- Village
- Location within Turkey
- Coordinates: 38.408°N 41.416°E
- Country: Turkey
- Province: Batman
- District: Sason
- Population (2021): 81
- Time zone: UTC+3 (TRT)

Kulaksız is a village in the Sason District, Batman Province, Turkey. The village had a population of 81 in 2021.
