= Bayramlar, Sason =

Village in Batman Province, Turkey

Bayramlar
- Village
- Location within Turkey
- Coordinates: 38.495°N 41.589°E
- Country: Turkey
- Province: Batman
- District: Sason
- Population (2021): 347
- Time zone: UTC+3 (TRT)

Bayramlar is a village in the Sason District, Batman Province, Turkey. The village is populated by Arabs and had a population of 347 in 2021.

The hamlets of Aykonak and Dikmetaş are attached to the village.
