= Hasankeyf District =

District of Batman Province, Turkey

- District
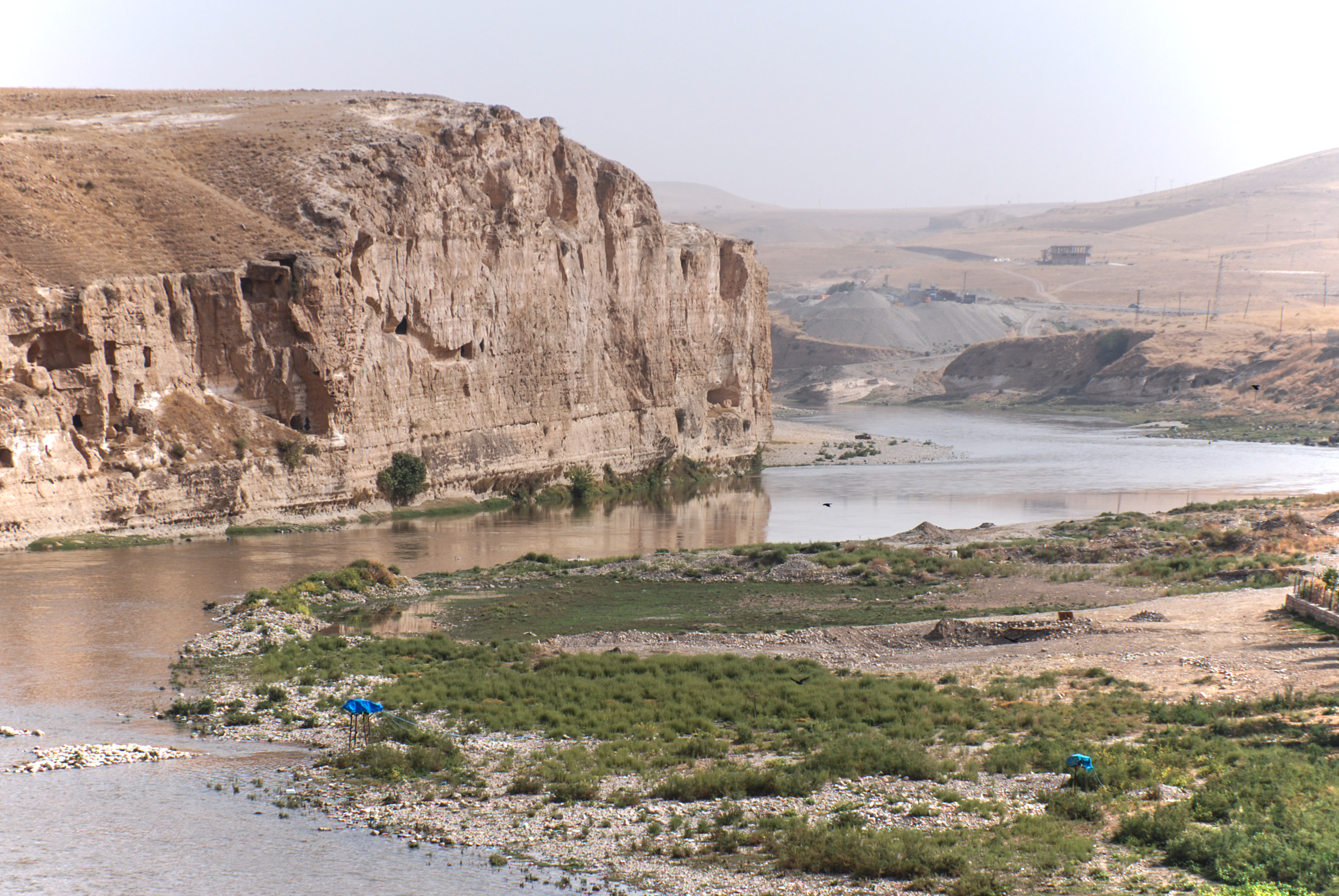
- River Tigris, Hasankeyf

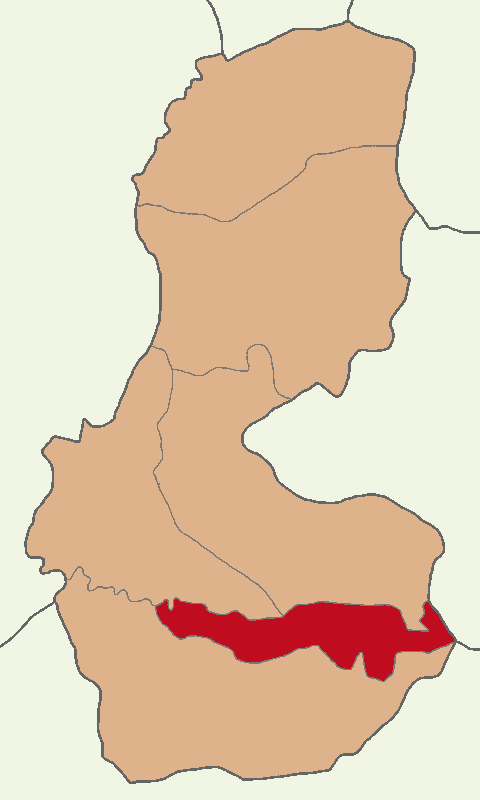
- Map showing Hasankeyf District in Batman Province

- Location within Turkey
- Coordinates: 37°43′N 41°25′E
- Country: Turkey
- Province: Batman
- Seat: Hasankeyf

Government
  - Kaymakam: Şenol Öztürk
- Area: 293 km^{2} (113 sq mi)
- Population (2021): 7,496
  - Density: 25.6/km^{2} (66.3/sq mi)
- Time zone: UTC+3 (TRT)
- Website: www.hasankeyf.gov.tr

Hasankeyf District is a district of Batman Province in Turkey. The town of Hasankeyf is the seat and the district had a population of 7,496 in 2021. Its area is 293 km^{2}. The district was established in 1990.

== Composition ==
There is one municipality in Hasankeyf District:

- Hasankeyf

There are 22 villages in Hasankeyf District:

1. Akalın (Alînê)
2. Aksu (Hizo)
3. Bayırlı (Kûneyn)
4. Büyükdere (Gerê)
5. Çardaklı (Gundê Kola)
6. Gaziler (Guhêrê)
7. Güneşli (Şemsê)
8. Irmakköy (Kefralbê)
9. İncirli (Derhawê)
10. Karaköy (Reşiye)
11. Kayıklı (Mîhîna)
12. Kelekçi (Miwêlê)
13. Kumluca (Merdîs)
14. Öğütlü (Mebiya)
15. Palamut (Xirbe Kur)
16. Saklı (Lepêna)
17. Soğucak (Kanîya mezin)
18. Tepebaşı (Gundê Diyar)
19. Uzundere (Wezrîn)
20. Üçyol (Difnê)
21. Yakaköy (Xanikan)
22. Yolüstü (Kêdil)

The district encompasses 7 hamlets.
