= Koçkaya, Sason =

Settlement in Batman Province, Turkey

Koçkaya
- Neighbourhood
- Location in Turkey
- Coordinates: 38.401°N 41.289°E
- Country: Turkey
- Province: Batman
- District: Sason
- Municipality: Yücebağ
- Population (2021): 700
- Time zone: UTC+3 (TRT)

Koçkaya (Kurdish: Heşter) is a neighbourhood of the town of Yücebağ, Sason District, Batman Province, Turkey. The quarter is populated by Kurds of the Xiyan tribe and had a population of 700 in 2021.
