= Kahveci, Kozluk =

Village in Batman Province, Turkey

Kahveci
- Village
- Location within Turkey
- Coordinates: 38.148°N 41.390°E
- Country: Turkey
- Province: Batman
- District: Kozluk
- Population (2021): 307
- Time zone: UTC+3 (TRT)

Kahveci (Kurdish: Qawecî) is a village in the Kozluk District of Batman Province in Turkey. The village is populated by Kurds of the Bekiran tribe and had a population of 307 in 2021.
