= Palamut, Hasankeyf =

Village in Batman Province, Turkey

Palamut
- Village
- Location within Turkey
- Coordinates: 37.709°N 41.679°E
- Country: Turkey
- Province: Batman
- District: Hasankeyf
- Population (2021): 43
- Time zone: UTC+3 (TRT)

Palamut (Kurdish: Xirbe Kur) is a village in the Hasankeyf District of Batman Province in Turkey. The village is populated by Kurds of the Derhawî tribe and had a population of 43 in 2021.

The hamlets of Keçili and Koyunlu are attached to the village.
