= Aydınlık, Sason =

Settlement in Batman Province, Turkey

Aydınlık
- Neighbourhood
- Location in Turkey
- Coordinates: 38.3704°N 41.2954°E
- Country: Turkey
- Province: Batman
- District: Sason
- Municipality: Yücebağ
- Population (2021): 536
- Time zone: UTC+3 (TRT)

Aydınlık (Kurdish: Şehika) is a neighbourhood of the town Yücebağ, Sason District, Batman Province, Turkey. Its quarter is populated by Kurds of the Xiyan tribe and had a population of 536 in 2021.
