= Turnalı, Sason =

Village in Batman Province, Turkey

Turnalı
- Village
- Location within Turkey
- Coordinates: 38.425°N 41.453°E
- Country: Turkey
- Province: Batman
- District: Sason
- Population (2021): 268
- Time zone: UTC+3 (TRT)

Turnalı is a village in the Sason District, Batman Province, Turkey. The village is populated by Arabs and had a population of 268 in 2021.

The hamlet of Taşburun is attached to the village.
