= Yuvalıçay, Sason =

Village in Batman Province, Turkey

Yuvalıçay
- Village
- Location within Turkey
- Coordinates: 38.369°N 41.394°E
- Country: Turkey
- Province: Batman
- District: Sason
- Population (2021): 159
- Time zone: UTC+3 (TRT)

Yuvalıçay is a village in the Sason District, Batman Province, Turkey. The village is populated by Arabs and had a population of 159 in 2021.
