= Kilis, Sason =

Village in Batman Province, Turkey

Kilis
- Village
- Location within Turkey
- Coordinates: 38.409°N 41.446°E
- Country: Turkey
- Province: Batman
- District: Sason
- Population (2021): 103
- Time zone: UTC+3 (TRT)

Kilis is a village in the Sason District, Batman Province, Turkey. The village had a population of 103 in 2021.
