= Ziyaret, Sason =

Village in Batman Province, Turkey

Ziyaret
- Village
- Location within Turkey
- Coordinates: 38.294°N 41.305°E
- Country: Turkey
- Province: Batman
- District: Sason
- Population (2021): 295
- Time zone: UTC+3 (TRT)

Ziyaret (Kurdish: Şeyhbal) is a village in the Sason District, Batman Province, Turkey. The village is populated by Kurds and had a population of 295 in 2021.
