= Güneşli, Hasankeyf =

Village in Batman Province, Turkey

Güneşli
- Village
- Location within Turkey
- Coordinates: 37.713°N 41.736°E
- Country: Turkey
- Province: Batman
- District: Hasankeyf
- Population (2021): 43
- Time zone: UTC+3 (TRT)

Güneşli (Kurdish: Şemsê) is a village in the Hasankeyf District of Batman Province in Turkey. The village is populated by Kurds of the Erebiyan tribe and had a population of 43 in 2021.
