= Mahmud Baksi =

Kurdish journalist

Mahmud Baksi (Mahmûd Baksî; 16 September 1944 – 19 December 2000), was a Kurdish writer and journalist. He was born in the village of Suphî in the Batman Province of southeastern Turkey. He began to publish a newspaper titled Batman Gazetesi in 1967. He became the head of the Batman branch of the Workers Party of Turkey. From 1968 to 1970, he became involved in the labor union movement of Turkey. Around the same period, he was sentenced to 15 years in prison for promoting Kurdish nationalism and advocating for an independent Kurdistan. In 1970, he fled to Germany and later to Sweden where he stayed until his death. He continued writing several works on Kurdish history. He is buried in Diyarbakır. He is the uncle of Nalin Pekgul who have been active at the Swedish socialdemocratic party and journalist Kurdo Baksi.

== See also ==
- List of Kurdish scholars
