= Kayıklı, Hasankeyf =

Village in Batman Province, Turkey

Kayıklı
- Village
- Location within Turkey
- Coordinates: 37.695°N 41.793°E
- Country: Turkey
- Province: Batman
- District: Hasankeyf
- Population (2021): 71
- Time zone: UTC+3 (TRT)

Kayıklı (Kurdish: Mîhîna) is a village in the Hasankeyf District of Batman Province in Turkey. The village is populated by Kurds of the Erebiyan tribe and had a population of 71 in 2021.
