= Topluca, Sason =

Village in Batman Province, Turkey

Topluca
- Village
- Location within Turkey
- Coordinates: 38.384°N 41.384°E
- Country: Turkey
- Province: Batman
- District: Sason
- Population (2021): 172
- Time zone: UTC+3 (TRT)

Topluca is a village in the Sason District, Batman Province, Turkey. The village is populated by Arabs and had a population of 172 in 2021.

== Notable people ==
- Kevork Chavush
