= Kurdo Baksi =

Swedish author (born 1965)

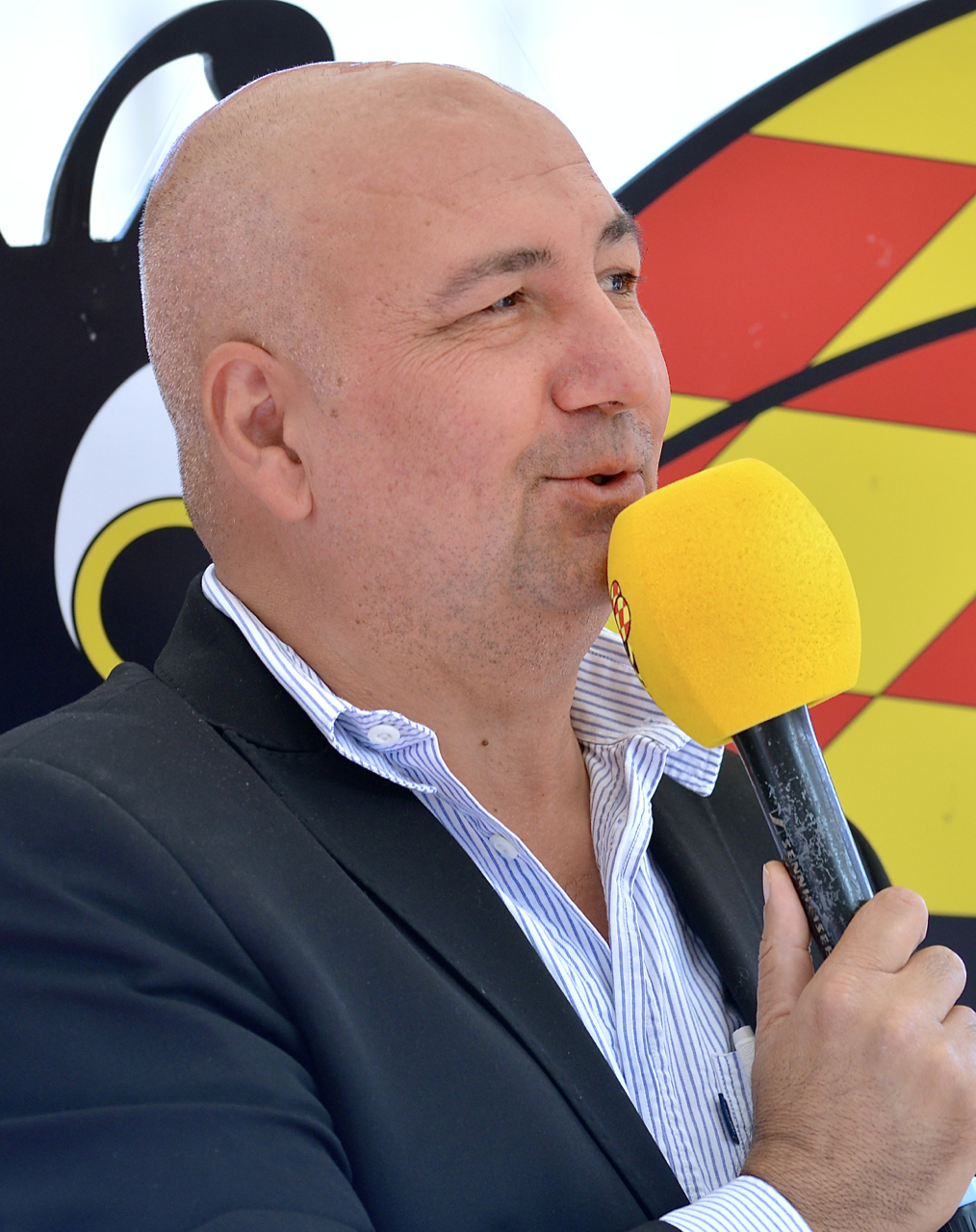
Kurdo Baksi

Kurdo Baksi (born 5 June 1965) is a Swedish social commentator and author.

Baksi was born in Batman, Turkey, of Kurdish descent. He is the brother of Nalin Pekgul and the nephew of Mahmud Baksi. He came to Sweden in 1980 along with his parents and four siblings.

Kurdo Baksi founded the anti-racist magazine Svartvitt in 1987. During a five-year period between 1998 and 2002, he helped Svartvitt and the anti-racist magazine Expo to survive by a co-operation between the magazines which merged and became Svartvitt med Expo. Svarvitt was cancelled in 2002–03 and the magazine changed name to Expo again.

In 1992, he organized a big anti-racist manifestation in Sweden under the name "Utan invandrare stannar Sverige" (Without immigrants Sweden stops), with the purpose of marking immigrants' importance in the Swedish society. Baksi is also an active debater, and lecturer in questions about immigration, racism, and opinion-making for the creation of an independent Kurdistan.

Baksi is a commentator and has written about topics such as Turkey, the Gray Wolves, Armenian genocide and armed conflict on Nagorno-Karabach.

Two of Baksi's books have been translated into English: Stieg Larsson: Our Days in Stockholm (2010) covers Stieg Larsson's career as a journalist and Stieg Larsson: The Man Behind The Girl with the Dragon Tattoo: a memoir of a friendship (2011) focuses om Larsson's Millennium series of fiction novels.
