= Dağçatı, Sason =

Village in Batman Province, Turkey

Dağçatı
- Village
- Location within Turkey
- Coordinates: 38.419°N 41.417°E
- Country: Turkey
- Province: Batman
- District: Sason
- Population (2021): 164
- Time zone: UTC+3 (TRT)

Dağçatı is a village in the Sason District, Batman Province, Turkey. The village is populated by Arabs and had a population of 164 in 2021.

The hamlet of Yorganlı is attached to the village.
