= Günyayla, Kozluk =

Village in Batman Province, Turkey

Günyayla
- Village
- Location within Turkey
- Coordinates: 38.021°N 41.522°E
- Country: Turkey
- Province: Batman
- District: Kozluk
- Population (2021): 19
- Time zone: UTC+3 (TRT)

Günyayla (Kurdish: Bizizê) is a village in the Kozluk District, Batman Province, Turkey. Its population is 19 (2021).
