= Kumlupınar, Kozluk =

Village in Batman Province, Turkey

Kumlupınar
- Village
- Location within Turkey
- Coordinates: 38.134°N 41.501°E
- Country: Turkey
- Province: Batman
- District: Kozluk
- Population (2021): 437
- Time zone: UTC+3 (TRT)

Kumlupınar (Kurdish: Gomikan) is a village in the Kozluk District, Batman Province, Turkey. Its population is 437 (2021).

The hamlets of Kocabey and Toptaşı are attached to the village.
