= Kaşyayla, Sason =

Village in Batman Province, Turkey

Kaşyayla
- Village
- Location within Turkey
- Coordinates: 38.436°N 41.291°E
- Country: Turkey
- Province: Batman
- District: Sason
- Population (2021): 363
- Time zone: UTC+3 (TRT)

Kaşyayla (Kurdish: Gidornî) is a village in the Sason District, Batman Province, Turkey. The village is populated by Kurds of the Xiyan tribe and had a population of 363 in 2021.

The hamlets of Elmapınar (Koroxo), Güvencik (Andibe), Kılıçören (Kiliçoran), Ocakçı, Taşyuva (Şilek) and Yayarlı (Hoper) are attached to the village.
