= Çağlı, Sason =

Village in Batman Province, Turkey

Çağlı
- Village
- Location within Turkey
- Coordinates: 38.365°N 41.280°E
- Country: Turkey
- Province: Batman
- District: Sason
- Population (2021): 193
- Time zone: UTC+3 (TRT)

Çağlı (Kurdish: Helîs) is a village in the Sason District, Batman Province, Turkey. The village is populated by Kurds of the Xiyan tribe and had a population of 193 in 2021.

The hamlets of Gündoğdu (Bilhan), Kancalı (Kanîya Hemze), Kuzguncuk (Kanîya Poma) and Uğurlar are attached to the village.
