= Yolüstü, Hasankeyf =

Village in Batman Province, Turkey

Yolüstü
- Village
- Location within Turkey
- Coordinates: 37.717°N 41.606°E
- Country: Turkey
- Province: Batman
- District: Hasankeyf
- Population (2021): 120
- Time zone: UTC+3 (TRT)

Yolüstü (Kurdish: Kêdil) is a village in the Hasankeyf District of Batman Province in Turkey. The village is populated by Kurds of the Derhawî tribe and had a population of 120 in 2021.

The hamlet of Çatalsu is attached to the village.
