= Köprübaşı, Sason =

Village in Batman Province, Turkey

Köprübaşı
- Village
- Location within Turkey
- Coordinates: 38.286°N 41.283°E
- Country: Turkey
- Province: Batman
- District: Sason
- Population (2021): 163
- Time zone: UTC+3 (TRT)

Köprübaşı (Kurdish: Çemê Miratê) is a village in the Sason District, Batman Province, Turkey. The village is populated by Kurds of the Timok tribe and had a population of 163 in 2021.
