= Alıçlı, Kozluk =

Village in Batman Province, Turkey

Alıçlı
- Village
- Location within Turkey
- Coordinates: 38.211°N 41.518°E
- Country: Turkey
- Province: Batman
- District: Kozluk
- Population (2021): 912
- Time zone: UTC+3 (TRT)

Alıçlı is a village in the Kozluk District of Batman Province in Turkey. The village is populated by Arabs and had a population of 912 in 2021.
