= Öğütlü, Hasankeyf =

Village in Batman Province, Turkey

Öğütlü
- Village
- Location within Turkey
- Coordinates: 37.707°N 41.603°E
- Country: Turkey
- Province: Batman
- District: Hasankeyf
- Population (2021): 101
- Time zone: UTC+3 (TRT)

Öğütlü (Kurdish: Mebiya) is a village in the Hasankeyf District of Batman Province in Turkey. The village is populated by Kurds of the Derhawî tribe and had a population of 101 in 2021.
