= Girbereşik, Batman =

Village in Batman Province, Turkey

Girbereşik
- Neighbourhood
- Location in Turkey
- Coordinates: 37.89378°N 41.08582°E
- Country: Turkey
- Province: Batman
- District: Batman
- Population (2011): 1,034
- Time zone: UTC+3 (TRT)

Girbereşik (Syriac: Ašik), formerly İkiztepe, is a neighbourhood in the District of Batman, Batman Province, Turkey. It is populated by Kurds of the Raman tribe and had a population of 1,508 in 2024. Known as İkiztepe until 2017, Girbereşik was incorporated into Batman that year as a neighbourhood and renamed with its local Kurdish name.

== History ==
Ašik (today called Girbereşik) was historically inhabited by Syriac Orthodox Christians. In the Syriac Orthodox patriarchal register of dues of 1870, it was recorded that the village had 6 households, who paid 14 dues, and did not have a church or a priest.

== See also ==
- İkiztepe oil field

== Bibliography ==
- Bcheiry, Iskandar (2009). The Syriac Orthodox Patriarchal Register of Dues of 1870: An Unpublished Historical Document from the Late Ottoman Period. Gorgias Press.
