= Acar, Sason =

Village in Batman Province, Turkey

Acar
- Village
- Location within Turkey
- Coordinates: 38.292°N 41.250°E
- Country: Turkey
- Province: Batman
- District: Sason
- Population (2021): 472
- Time zone: UTC+3 (TRT)

Acar (Kurdish: Herend), formerly called Argint, is a village in the Sason District of Batman Province, Turkey. The village is populated by Kurds of the Xiyan tribe and had a population of 472 in 2021.

The hamlets of Güneşli (Herda) and Hasanlar (Hasanan) are attached to the village.

== History ==
Acar was historically an Armenian village until 1952, when half of the settlement was sold to Kurds. In 1964, following threats from Kurdish neighbours, the village's Christian Armenian population underwent mass conversion to Islam. As reported in the Turkish newspaper Hürriyet, the conversion involved 88 people - 48 children and 40 men and women - after which the names of the villagers were changed and the village church was converted into a mosque. Despite the conversion, Kurdish villagers burned Armenian fields later that year, forcing many to flee to Diyarbekir. Military intervention by the Turkish army allowed most to return in 1965. The remaining Armenian families continued to live in Acar until 1985, when the rest of the village was sold to Kurds, prompting the remaining Armenians to relocate to Istanbul. A further conversion to Islam reportedly took place in 1983, as documented by Benninghaus.
