= Aşağıkıratlı, Kozluk =

Village in Batman Province, Turkey

Aşağıkıratlı
- Village
- Location within Turkey
- Coordinates: 38.195°N 41.380°E
- Country: Turkey
- Province: Batman
- District: Kozluk
- Population (2021): 363
- Time zone: UTC+3 (TRT)

Aşağıkıratlı (Kurdish: Baştirim) is a village in the Kozluk District of Batman Province in Turkey. The village is populated by Kurds and had a population of 363 in 2021.
