= Çayönü, Kozluk =

Village in Batman Province, Turkey

Çayönü
- Village
- Location within Turkey
- Coordinates: 38.126°N 41.511°E
- Country: Turkey
- Province: Batman
- District: Kozluk
- Population (2021): 1,194
- Time zone: UTC+3 (TRT)

Çayönü (Kurdish: Reşedaran) is a village in the Kozluk District, Batman Province, Turkey. Its population is 1,194 (2021).

The hamlets of Çakırlar, Dere, Dilimli, İncili, Kesmetaş, Kurşunlu and Yeniköy are attached to the village.
