= Seyrantepe, Kozluk =

Village in Batman Province, Turkey

Seyrantepe
- Village
- Location within Turkey
- Coordinates: 38.0890°N 41.4076°E
- Country: Turkey
- Province: Batman
- District: Kozluk
- Population (2021): 21
- Time zone: UTC+3 (TRT)

Seyrantepe (Kurdish: Çirto) is a village in the Kozluk District, Batman Province, Turkey. Its population is 21 (2021).
