= Üçyol, Hasankeyf =

Village in Batman Province, Turkey

Üçyol
- Village
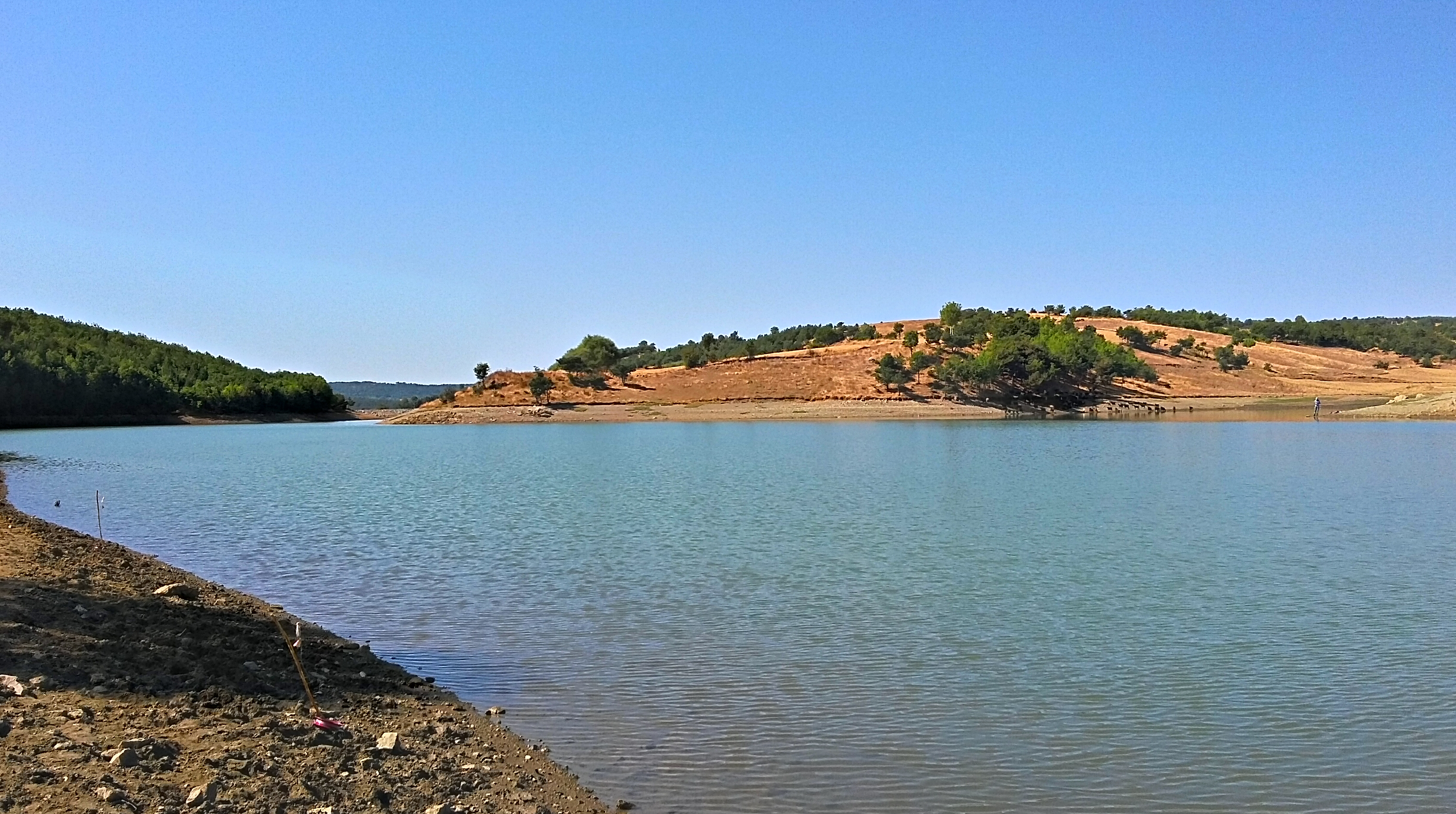
- Vicinity of village

- Location within Turkey
- Coordinates: 37.705°N 41.465°E
- Country: Turkey
- Province: Batman
- District: Hasankeyf
- Population (2021): 415
- Time zone: UTC+3 (TRT)

Üçyol (Note: "Three-ways" in Turkish.) (Kurdish: Difnê; Syriac: Dufne) (Note: Alternatively transliterated as Dafneth, Dafeneth, Dafna, Dafne, Defna, Defnē, Défné, Difne, Difni, or Dufnê.) is a village in the Hasankeyf District of Batman Province in Turkey. The village is populated by Kurds of both non-tribal affiliation and the Erebiyan tribe. It had a population of 415 in 2021. It is located on the south bank of the Tigris in the historic region of Tur Abdin.

The hamlet of Kavak is attached to the village.

== History ==
Dufne (today called Üçyol) has been identified as the site of the Roman castrum Daphnoudis (Greek: Δαφνοῦδιν, romanized: Daphnoudin) in the province of Mesopotamia, mentioned by George of Cyprus in Descriptio Orbis Romani. Mar Aho the Anchorite founded a small monastery at the village in the sixth century AD called the Monastery of Dafneth, also known as the Monastery of Mar Aho. The Monastery of the Cross (Note: Syriac: Dayro da Slivo.) at Atafiya, also known as the Monastery of Makhar, (Note: Sometimes known as Der el-Mukhr.) was located near Dufne; it was believed to have been constructed by Emperor Anastasius I Dicorus (r. 591–518) and designed by the architects Theodosius and Theodorus.

Cyril Yuhanna, son of the priest Simon of Bati, who had been ordained as metropolitan bishop of Midyat and the Monastery of the Cross at Atafiya (fl. 1468–1519) by Ignatius 'Aziz, Patriarch of Tur Abdin, was from Dufne. Basilius Denha, maphrian of Tur Abdin, resided at the cloister of Mar Barsoum near Dufne in 1749, where he transcribed a book of husoyos (supplicatory prayers) for the Resurrection. Dionysius Israel Sha’o of Basibrina, who had been metropolitan bishop of the Monastery of the Cross at Bethel in 1779, was transferred to the metropolitan see of Makhar and the Monastery of Dafneth (1792–1798).

Cotton was cultivated at Dufne using irrigation from the Tigris. In 1914, it was populated by 200 Syriacs, as per the list presented to the Paris Peace Conference by the Assyro-Chaldean delegation. It was located in the kaza of Midyat. There were 40 Syriac families in 1915. The Syriacs adhered to the Syriac Orthodox Church. Amidst the Sayfo, the village was attacked by Kurds of the Rama tribe led by Amin Ahmad and the Syriacs were captured and taken to the Tigris, where they were killed and their bodies were thrown into the river, leaving only six survivors. The priest Shi'mun (Simon) was skinned alive. There were no remaining Syriacs at Dufne by 1987.

== Bibliography ==
- Barsoum, Aphrem (2003). The Scattered Pearls: A History of Syriac Literature and Sciences. Translated by Matti Moosa (2nd ed.). Gorgias Press.
- Barsoum, Aphrem (2008). The History of Tur Abdin. Translated by Matti Moosa. Gorgias Press.
- Barsoum, Aphrem (2009). History of the Syriac Dioceses. Vol. 1. Translated by Matti Moosa. Gorgias Press.
- Courtois, Sébastien de (2004). The Forgotten Genocide: Eastern Christians, The Last Arameans. Translated by Vincent Aurora. Gorgias Press.
- Gaunt, David (2006). Massacres, Resistance, Protectors: Muslim-Christian Relations in Eastern Anatolia during World War I. Gorgias Press.
- Jongerden, Joost; Verheij, Jelle, eds. (2012). Social Relations in Ottoman Diyarbekir, 1870-1915. Brill.
- Marciak, Michał (2017). Sophene, Gordyene, and Adiabene: Three Regna Minora of Northern Mesopotamia Between East and West. Brill. ISBN 978-90-04-35072-4.
- Palmer, Andrew (1990). Monk and Mason on the Tigris Frontier: The Early History of Tur Abdin. Cambridge University Press.
- Sinclair, T.A. (1989). Eastern Turkey: An Architectural & Archaeological Survey. Vol. III. Pindar Press. ISBN 9780907132349.
- Tan, Altan (2018). Turabidin'den Berriye'ye. Aşiretler - Dinler - Diller - Kültürler (in Turkish). Pak Ajans Yayincilik Turizm Ve Diş Ticaret Limited şirketi. ISBN 9789944360944.
