= Yuvalar, Sason =

Village in Batman Province, Turkey

Yuvalar
- Village
- Location within Turkey
- Coordinates: 38.426°N 41.524°E
- Country: Turkey
- Province: Batman
- District: Sason
- Population (2021): 314
- Time zone: UTC+3 (TRT)

Yuvalar is a village in the Sason District, Batman Province, Turkey. The village is populated by Arabs and had a population of 314 in 2021.

The hamlets of Sarıkız and Üçdilek are attached to the village.
