= Parmakkapı, Kozluk =

Village in Batman Province, Turkey

Parmakkapı
- Village
- Location within Turkey
- Coordinates: 38.121°N 41.261°E
- Country: Turkey
- Province: Batman
- District: Kozluk
- Population (2021): 427
- Time zone: UTC+3 (TRT)

Parmakkapı (Kurdish: Huskut) is a village in the Kozluk District of Batman Province in Turkey. The village is populated by Kurds of the Bekiran and Reşkotan tribes and had a population of 427 in 2021.
