= Yakabağ, Sason =

Village in Batman Province, Turkey

Yakabağ
- Village
- Location within Turkey
- Coordinates: 38.477°N 41.391°E
- Country: Turkey
- Province: Batman
- District: Sason
- Population (2021): 126
- Time zone: UTC+3 (TRT)

Yakabağ (Kurdish: Hergork) is a village in the Sason District, Batman Province, Turkey. The village is populated by Kurds and had a population of 126 in 2021.
