= Beybağı, Kozluk =

Village in Batman Province, Turkey

Beybağı
- Village
- Location within Turkey
- Coordinates: 38.103°N 41.595°E
- Country: Turkey
- Province: Batman
- District: Kozluk
- Population (2021): 232
- Time zone: UTC+3 (TRT)

Beybağı (Kurdish: Herbeloz) is a village in the Kozluk District of Batman Province in Turkey. The village had a population of 232 in 2021.
