= Dereköy, Kozluk =

Village in Batman Province, Turkey

Dereköy
- Village
- Location within Turkey
- Coordinates: 38.223°N 41.372°E
- Country: Turkey
- Province: Batman
- District: Kozluk
- Population (2021): 428
- Time zone: UTC+3 (TRT)

Dereköy (Kurdish: Dêra) is a village in the Kozluk District of Batman Province in Turkey. The village is populated by Kurds and had a population of 482 in 2021.

The hamlets of Soylu and Tekeli are attached to the village.
