= Uzunyazı, Kozluk =

Village in Batman Province, Turkey

Uzunyazı
- Village
- Location within Turkey
- Coordinates: 38.141°N 41.579°E
- Country: Turkey
- Province: Batman
- District: Kozluk
- Population (2021): 436
- Time zone: UTC+3 (TRT)

Uzunyazı (Kurdish: Tojgan) is a village in the Kozluk District of Batman Province in Turkey. The village is populated by Kurds and had a population of 436 in 2021.

The hamlets of Seymenler and Uğurlu are attached to the village.
