= Samanyolu, Kozluk =

Village in Batman Province, Turkey

Samanyolu
- Village
- Location within Turkey
- Coordinates: 38.106°N 41.226°E
- Country: Turkey
- Province: Batman
- District: Kozluk
- Population (2021): 760
- Time zone: UTC+3 (TRT)

Samanyolu (Kurdish: Kanîkê) is a village in the Kozluk District of Batman Province in Turkey. The village is populated by Kurds of the Bekiran and Reşkotan tribes and had a population of 760 in 2021.
