= İnişli, Kozluk =

Village in Batman Province, Turkey

İnişli
- Village
- Location within Turkey
- Coordinates: 38.236°N 41.495°E
- Country: Turkey
- Province: Batman
- District: Kozluk
- Population (2021): 430
- Time zone: UTC+3 (TRT)

İnişli (also known as Balo) is a village in the Kozluk District of Batman Province in Turkey. The village is populated by Arabs and had a population of 430 in 2021.

The hamlets of Cemalo, Tepeli and Tunçbilek are attached to the village.
