= Koçaklı, Kozluk =

Village in Batman Province, Turkey

Koçaklı
- Village
- Location within Turkey
- Coordinates: 38.0750°N 41.3420°E
- Country: Turkey
- Province: Batman
- District: Kozluk
- Population (2021): 787
- Time zone: UTC+3 (TRT)

Koçaklı (Kurdish: Zixor) is a village in the Kozluk District, Batman Province, Turkey. The village is populated by Kurds of the Reşkotan tribe and had a population of 787 in 2021.

The hamlets of Güveçli and Norşen are attached to the village.
