= Kayadibi, Kozluk =

Village in Batman Province, Turkey

Kayadibi
- Village
- Location within Turkey
- Coordinates: 38.2645°N 41.4379°E
- Country: Turkey
- Province: Batman
- District: Kozluk
- Population (2021): 146
- Time zone: UTC+3 (TRT)

Kayadibi (Kurdish: Papûr) is a village in the Kozluk District, Batman Province, Turkey. Its population is 146 (2021).

The hamlets of Atlı and Binektaşı are attached to the village.
