= Yankılı, Kozluk =

Village in Batman Province, Turkey

Yankılı
- Village
- Location within Turkey
- Coordinates: 38.103°N 41.458°E
- Country: Turkey
- Province: Batman
- District: Kozluk
- Population (2021): 461
- Time zone: UTC+3 (TRT)

Yankılı (Kurdish: Hafik) is a village in the Kozluk District, Batman Province, Turkey. Its population is 461 (2021).
