= Kilimli, Sason =

Village in Batman Province, Turkey

Kilimli
- Village
- Location within Turkey
- Coordinates: 38.302°N 41.336°E
- Country: Turkey
- Province: Batman
- District: Sason
- Population (2021): 61
- Time zone: UTC+3 (TRT)

Kilimli (Kurdish: Belave) is a village in the Sason District, Batman Province, Turkey. The village is populated by Kurds of the Timok tribe and had a population of 61 in 2021.
