= Tuzlagözü, Kozluk =

Village in Batman Province, Turkey

Tuzlagözü
- Village
- Location within Turkey
- Coordinates: 38.181°N 41.569°E
- Country: Turkey
- Province: Batman
- District: Kozluk
- Population (2021): 807
- Time zone: UTC+3 (TRT)

Tuzlagözü (also known as Melefan) is a village in the Kozluk District of Batman Province in Turkey. The village is populated by Arabs and had a population of 807 in 2021.

The hamlets of Örnek and Yokuş are attached to the village.
