= Aksu, Hasankeyf =

Village in Batman Province, Turkey

Aksu
- Village
- Location within Turkey
- Coordinates: 37.662°N 41.360°E
- Country: Turkey
- Province: Batman
- District: Hasankeyf
- Population (2021): 121
- Time zone: UTC+3 (TRT)

Aksu (Kurdish: Hizo, Hizuwê, Îzîve) is a village in the Hasankeyf District of Batman Province in Turkey. The village is populated by Kurds of the Reman tribe and had a population of 121 in 2021.
