= Geyikli, Kozluk =

Village in Batman Province, Turkey

Geyikli
- Village
- Location within Turkey
- Coordinates: 38.216°N 41.433°E
- Country: Turkey
- Province: Batman
- District: Kozluk
- Population (2021): 254
- Time zone: UTC+3 (TRT)

Geyikli (Kurdish: Mangîk) is a village in the Kozluk District of Batman Province in Turkey. The village is populated by Kurds and had a population of 254 in 2021.

The hamlet of Mergedere is attached to the village.
