= Güllüce, Kozluk =

Village in Batman Province, Turkey

Güllüce
- Village
- Location within Turkey
- Coordinates: 38.149°N 41.604°E
- Country: Turkey
- Province: Batman
- District: Kozluk
- Population (2021): 151
- Time zone: UTC+3 (TRT)

Güllüce (Kurdish: Siçan) is a village in the Kozluk District, Batman Province, Turkey. Its population is 151 (2021).
