= Uzundere, Hasankeyf =

Village in Batman Province, Turkey

Uzundere
- Village
- Location within Turkey
- Coordinates: 37.663°N 41.393°E
- Country: Turkey
- Province: Batman
- District: Hasankeyf
- Population (2021): 138
- Time zone: UTC+3 (TRT)

Uzundere (Kurdish: Wezrîn) is a village in the Hasankeyf District of Batman Province in Turkey. The village is populated by Kurds from different tribal background including the Reman tribe and had a population of 138 in 2021.
