= Kayadüzü, Sason =

Village in Batman Province, Turkey

Kayadüzü
- Village
- Location within Turkey
- Coordinates: 38.354°N 41.464°E
- Country: Turkey
- Province: Batman
- District: Sason
- Population (2021): 364
- Time zone: UTC+3 (TRT)

Kayadüzü is a village in the Sason District, Batman Province, Turkey. The village is populated by Arabs and had a population of 364 in 2021.
