= Yedibölük, Kozluk =

Village in Batman Province, Turkey

Yedibölük
- Village
- Location within Turkey
- Coordinates: 38.235°N 41.391°E
- Country: Turkey
- Province: Batman
- District: Kozluk
- Population (2021): 374
- Time zone: UTC+3 (TRT)

Yedibölük (Kurdish: Mîşrîtan) is a village in the Kozluk District of Batman Province in Turkey. The village is populated by Kurds of the Sarmi tribe and had a population of 374 in 2021.
