= Meşeli, Sason =

Village in Batman Province, Turkey

Meşeli
- Village
- Location within Turkey
- Coordinates: 38.415°N 41.491°E
- Country: Turkey
- Province: Batman
- District: Sason
- Population (2021): 225
- Time zone: UTC+3 (TRT)

Meşeli is a village in the Sason District, Batman Province, Turkey. The village is populated by Arabs and had a population of 225 in 2021.

The hamlet of Güleç is attached to the village.
