= Armutlu, Kozluk =

Village in Batman Province, Turkey

Armutlu
- Village
- Location within Turkey
- Coordinates: 38.262°N 41.476°E
- Country: Turkey
- Province: Batman
- District: Kozluk
- Population (2021): 718
- Time zone: UTC+3 (TRT)

Armutlu (also known as Harbak) is a village in the Kozluk District of Batman Province in Turkey. The village is populated by Arabs and had a population of 718 in 2021.

The hamlets of Kumrular and Sarıda are attached to the village.
