= Karşıyaka, Kozluk =

Village in Batman Province, Turkey

Karşıyaka
- Village
- Location within Turkey
- Coordinates: 38.139°N 41.560°E
- Country: Turkey
- Province: Batman
- District: Kozluk
- Population (2021): 39
- Time zone: UTC+3 (TRT)

Karşıyaka (Kurdish: Derşawan) is a village in the Kozluk District of Batman Province in Turkey. The village is populated by Kurds and had a population of 39 in 2021.
