= Yolüstü, Sason =

Village in Batman Province, Turkey

Yolüstü
- Village
- Location within Turkey
- Coordinates: 38.384°N 41.468°E
- Country: Turkey
- Province: Batman
- District: Sason
- Population (2021): 378
- Time zone: UTC+3 (TRT)

Yolüstü is a village in the Sason District, Batman Province, Turkey. The village is populated by Arabs and had a population of 378 in 2021.

The hamlet of Gümeçli is attached to the village.
