= Bayırlı, Hasankeyf =

Village in Batman Province, Turkey

Bayırlı
- Village
- Location within Turkey
- Coordinates: 37.679°N 41.518°E
- Country: Turkey
- Province: Batman
- District: Hasankeyf
- Population (2021): 29
- Time zone: UTC+3 (TRT)

Bayırlı (Kurdish: Kûneyn) is a village in the Hasankeyf District of Batman Province in Turkey. The village is populated by Kurds of the Derhawî tribe and had a population of 29 in 2021.
