= Taşlıdere, Kozluk =

Village in Batman Province, Turkey

Taşlıdere
- Village
- Location within Turkey
- Coordinates: 38.221°N 41.256°E
- Country: Turkey
- Province: Batman
- District: Kozluk
- Population (2021): 907
- Time zone: UTC+3 (TRT)

Taşlıdere (Kurdish: Hol) is a village in the Kozluk District of Batman Province in Turkey. The village is populated by Kurds of the Bekiran tribe and had a population of 907 in 2021.

The hamlets of Doğancı (Kififê) and Yuvacık are attached to the village.
