= Ziyaret, Kozluk =

Village in Batman Province, Turkey

Ziyaret
- Village
- Location within Turkey
- Coordinates: 38.2405°N 41.2524°E
- Country: Turkey
- Province: Batman
- District: Kozluk
- Population (2021): 273
- Time zone: UTC+3 (TRT)

Ziyaret (Kurdish: Helin) is a village in the Kozluk District, Batman Province, Turkey. The village is populated by Kurds of the Bekiran tribe and had a population of 273 in 2021.

The hamlets of Canlar, Çayönü and Yukarı Ziyaret are attached to the village.
