= Karpuzlu, Kozluk =

Village in Batman Province, Turkey

Karpuzlu
- Village
- Location within Turkey
- Coordinates: 38.121°N 41.237°E
- Country: Turkey
- Province: Batman
- District: Kozluk
- Population (2021): 135
- Time zone: UTC+3 (TRT)

Karpuzlu (Kurdish: Selîbê, Selîvê) is a village in the Kozluk District of Batman Province in Turkey. The village is populated by Kurds of the Bekiran and Reşkotan tribes and had a population of 135 in 2021.

The hamlets of Kaynarca and Üçyol are attached to the village.
