= Pınarhisar, Kozluk =

Village in Batman Province, Turkey

Pınarhisar
- Village
- Location within Turkey
- Coordinates: 38.112°N 41.411°E
- Country: Turkey
- Province: Batman
- District: Kozluk
- Population (2021): 407
- Time zone: UTC+3 (TRT)

Pınarhisar (Kurdish: Eynhisanê) is a village in the Kozluk District, Batman Province, Turkey. Its population is 407 (2021).
