= Yeniköy, Sason =

Village in Batman Province, Turkey

Yeniköy
- Village
- Location within Turkey
- Coordinates: 38.279°N 41.274°E
- Country: Turkey
- Province: Batman
- District: Sason
- Population (2021): 329
- Time zone: UTC+3 (TRT)

Yeniköy (Kurdish: Mala Mergî) is a village in the Sason District, Batman Province, Turkey. The village is populated by Kurds of the Timok tribe and had a population of 392 in 2021.
