= İncesu, Sason =

Village in Batman Province, Turkey

İncesu
- Village
- Location within Turkey
- Coordinates: 38.420°N 41.373°E
- Country: Turkey
- Province: Batman
- District: Sason
- Population (2021): 177
- Time zone: UTC+3 (TRT)

İncesu is a village in the Sason District, Batman Province, Turkey. The village is populated by Arabs and had a population of 177 in 2021.
