= Yenidoğan Ase, Kozluk =

Village in Batman Province, Turkey

Yenidoğan
- Village
- Location within Turkey
- Coordinates: 38.276°N 41.571°E
- Country: Turkey
- Province: Batman
- District: Kozluk
- Population (2021): 487
- Time zone: UTC+3 (TRT)

Yenidoğan (also known as Asi) is a village in the Kozluk District of Batman Province in Turkey. The village is populated by Arabs and had a population of 487 in 2021.

The hamlets of Alacalar, Budak, İkizce, Örmeli, Seyrantepe and Tepecik are attached to the village.
