= Taşlık, Kozluk =

Village in Batman Province, Turkey

Taşlık
- Village
- Location within Turkey
- Coordinates: 38.1261°N 41.5840°E
- Country: Turkey
- Province: Batman
- District: Kozluk
- Population (2021): 317
- Time zone: UTC+3 (TRT)

Taşlık (Kurdish: Berzan) is a village in the Kozluk District, Batman Province, Turkey. Its population is 317 (2021).
