= Soğucak, Hasankeyf =

Village in Batman Province, Turkey

Soğucak
- Village
- Location within Turkey
- Coordinates: 37.685°N 41.604°E
- Country: Turkey
- Province: Batman
- District: Hasankeyf
- Population (2021): 58
- Time zone: UTC+3 (TRT)

Soğucak (Kurdish: Kanîya mezin) is a village in the Hasankeyf District of Batman Province in Turkey. The village is populated by Kurds of the Derhawî tribe and had a population of 58 in 2021.
