= Sarıyayla, Sason =

Village in Batman Province, Turkey

Sarıyayla
- Village
- Location within Turkey
- Coordinates: 38.419°N 41.586°E
- Country: Turkey
- Province: Batman
- District: Sason
- Population (2021): 422
- Time zone: UTC+3 (TRT)

Sarıyayla is a village in the Sason District, Batman Province, Turkey. The village is populated by Arabs and had a population of 422 in 2021.

The hamlets of Alagöz, Gümüşkemer, Yelek, Yıldızkaya and Yolaç are attached to the village.
