= Balbaşı, Sason =

Village in Batman Province, Turkey

Balbaşı
- Village
- Location within Turkey
- Coordinates: 38.316°N 41.205°E
- Country: Turkey
- Province: Batman
- District: Sason
- Population (2021): 142
- Time zone: UTC+3 (TRT)

Balbaşı (Kurdish: Herîbe) is a village in the Sason District, Batman Province, Turkey. The village is populated by Kurds of the Xiyan tribe and had a population of 142 in 2021.

The hamlet of Pazarcık (Abdikan) is attached to the village.
