= Akçakışla, Kozluk =

Village in Batman Province, Turkey

Akçakışla
- Village
- Location within Turkey
- Coordinates: 38.265°N 41.610°E
- Country: Turkey
- Province: Batman
- District: Kozluk
- Population (2021): 360
- Time zone: UTC+3 (TRT)

Akçakışla (also known as Dergüç) is a village in the Kozluk District of Batman Province in Turkey. The village is populated by Arabs and had a population of 360 in 2021.

The hamlets of Atalar, Çengelli, Damarlı and Dutluca are attached to the village.
