= Karameşe, Sason =

Village in Batman Province, Turkey

Karameşe
- Village
- Location within Turkey
- Coordinates: 38.291°N 41.334°E
- Country: Turkey
- Province: Batman
- District: Sason
- Population (2021): 288
- Time zone: UTC+3 (TRT)

Karameşe (Kurdish: Sebane) is a village in the Sason District, Batman Province, Turkey. The village is populated by Kurds of the Timok tribe and had a population of 288 in 2021.

The hamlets of Bölücek (Gamik) and Ramazan are attached to the village.
