= Derince, Sason =

Village in Batman Province, Turkey

Derince
- Village
- Location within Turkey
- Coordinates: 38.448°N 41.471°E
- Country: Turkey
- Province: Batman
- District: Sason
- Population (2021): 472
- Time zone: UTC+3 (TRT)

Derince (Armenian: Քաղքիկ, romanized: Kʻaghkʻik) is a village in the Sason District, Batman Province, Turkey. The village is populated by Arabs and had a population of 472 in 2021. The hamlets of Çakmakçı and Özlüce are attached to the village.

The village was previously known as Kaghkik, Sasun or Hin Sasun ("old Sasun" in Armenian). It is located near the ancient fortress of Sasun, also known in Armenian sources as Sasuntsi Davti Berd ("the fortress of David of Sassoun").
