= Heybeli, Sason =

Village in Batman Province, Turkey

Heybeli
- Village
- Location within Turkey
- Coordinates: 38.343°N 41.258°E
- Country: Turkey
- Province: Batman
- District: Sason
- Population (2021): 576
- Time zone: UTC+3 (TRT)

Heybeli (Kurdish: Tanze) is a village in the Sason District, Batman Province, Turkey. The village is populated by Kurds of the Xiyan tribe and had a population of 576 in 2021.

The hamlets of Akbelen (Akbala), Genişler (Kaniya Tuve) and Yeniyurt (Memikan) are attached to the village.
