= Kamışlı, Kozluk =

Village in Batman Province, Turkey

Kamışlı
- Village
- Location within Turkey
- Coordinates: 38.099°N 41.357°E
- Country: Turkey
- Province: Batman
- District: Kozluk
- Population (2021): 426
- Time zone: UTC+3 (TRT)

Kamışlı (Kurdish: Balika, Şedirke) is a village in the Kozluk District, Batman Province, Turkey. The village is populated by Kurds of the Reşkotan tribe and had a population of 426 in 2021.

The hamlet of Akağaç is attached to the village.
