= Yayalar, Kozluk =

Village in Batman Province, Turkey

Yayalar
- Village
- Location within Turkey
- Coordinates: 38.205°N 41.319°E
- Country: Turkey
- Province: Batman
- District: Kozluk
- Population (2021): 505
- Time zone: UTC+3 (TRT)

Yayalar (Kurdish: Kenik) is a village in the Kozluk District of Batman Province in Turkey. The village is populated by Kurds of the Bekiran tribe and had a population of 505 in 2021.

The hamlet of Okçular is attached to the village.
