= Yücebağ =

Town in Batman Province, Turkey

- Municipality
- Location in Turkey
- Coordinates: 38.391°N 41.272°E
- Country: Turkey
- Province: Batman
- District: Sason
- Population (2021): 2,729
- Time zone: UTC+3 (TRT)

Yücebağ (Kurdish: Cacas, Armenian: Ջոջենք, romanized: Jojenq) is a town (belde) and municipality in the Sason District, Batman Province, Turkey. Its population is 2,729 (2021). The town consists of the quarters Tepe, Barış, Yıldız, Karşıyaka, Aydınlık, Binekli, Günlüce and Koçkaya. The town is populated by Kurds of the Xiyan tribe.
