= Irmakköy, Hasankeyf =

Village in Batman Province, Turkey

Irmakköy
- Village
- Location within Turkey
- Coordinates: 37.716°N 41.525°E
- Country: Turkey
- Province: Batman
- District: Hasankeyf
- Population (2021): 280
- Time zone: UTC+3 (TRT)

Irmakköy (Kurdish: Kefralbê) is a village in the Hasankeyf District of Batman Province in Turkey. The village is populated by Kurds of the Derhawî tribe and had a population of 280 in 2021.

The hamlet of Kavacık is attached to the village.
