= Seyitler, Kozluk =

Village in Batman Province, Turkey

Seyitler
- Village
- Location within Turkey
- Coordinates: 38.177°N 41.352°E
- Country: Turkey
- Province: Batman
- District: Kozluk
- Population (2021): 143
- Time zone: UTC+3 (TRT)

Seyitler is a village in the Kozluk District, Batman Province, Turkey. Its population is 143 (2021).
