= Arıkaya, Kozluk =

Village in Batman Province, Turkey

Arıkaya
- Village
- Location within Turkey
- Coordinates: 38.072°N 41.539°E
- Country: Turkey
- Province: Batman
- District: Kozluk
- Population (2021): 376
- Time zone: UTC+3 (TRT)

Arıkaya (Kurdish: Petêxî) is a village in the Kozluk District of Batman Province in Turkey. The village had a population of 376 in 2021.

The hamlets of Dikbayır, Gökbudak, Irmak and Yemişlik are attached to the village.
