= Bölükkonak, Kozluk =

Village in Batman Province, Turkey

Bölükkonak
- Village
- Location within Turkey
- Coordinates: 38.226°N 41.419°E
- Country: Turkey
- Province: Batman
- District: Kozluk
- Population (2021): 215
- Time zone: UTC+3 (TRT)

Bölükkonak (Kurdish: Hergemo) is a village in the Kozluk District of Batman Province in Turkey. The village is populated by Kurds of the Sarmi tribe and had a population of 215 in 2021.
