= Yıldızlı, Kozluk =

Village in Batman Province, Turkey

Yıldızlı
- Village
- Location within Turkey
- Coordinates: 38.0884°N 41.4846°E
- Country: Turkey
- Province: Batman
- District: Kozluk
- Population (2021): 220
- Time zone: UTC+3 (TRT)

Yıldızlı (Kurdish: Kevneraz) is a village in the Kozluk District, Batman Province, Turkey. Its population is 220 (2021).
