= Yazılı, Kozluk =

Village in Batman Province, Turkey

Yazılı
- Village
- Location within Turkey
- Coordinates: 38.236°N 41.539°E
- Country: Turkey
- Province: Batman
- District: Kozluk
- Population (2021): 396
- Time zone: UTC+3 (TRT)

Yazılı (also known as Binik) is a village in the Kozluk District of Batman Province in Turkey. The village is populated by Arabs and had a population of 396 in 2021.

The hamlets of Arkbaşı, Keseli and Köseler are attached to the village.
