= Örensu, Kozluk =

Village in Batman Province, Turkey

Örensu
- Village
- Location within Turkey
- Coordinates: 38.034°N 41.454°E
- Country: Turkey
- Province: Batman
- District: Kozluk
- Population (2021): 66
- Time zone: UTC+3 (TRT)

Örensu (Kurdish: Subhî) is a village in the Kozluk District of Batman Province in Turkey. The village had a population of 66 in 2021.

The hamlet of Kömürlü is attached to the village.

== Notable people ==
- Mahmud Baksi
