= Ünsaldı, Kozluk =

Village in Batman Province, Turkey

Ünsaldı
- Village
- Location within Turkey
- Coordinates: 38.060°N 41.436°E
- Country: Turkey
- Province: Batman
- District: Kozluk
- Population (2021): 856
- Time zone: UTC+3 (TRT)

Ünsaldı (Kurdish: Dirşane) is a village in the Kozluk District of Batman Province in Turkey. The village is populated by Kurds and had a population of 856 in 2021.

The hamlet of Koyuncular is attached to the village.
