= Gürgenli, Sason =

Village in Batman Province, Turkey

Gürgenli
- Village
- Location within Turkey
- Coordinates: 38.375°N 41.392°E
- Country: Turkey
- Province: Batman
- District: Sason
- Elevation: 1,384 m (4,541 ft)
- Population (2021): 315
- Time zone: UTC+3 (TRT)
- Postal code: 72502
- Area code: 0488

Gürgenli is a village in the Sason District, Batman Province, Turkey. The village is populated by Arabs and had a population of 315 in 2021. The hamlet of Güvenç is attached to the village.

== Geography ==
The village is 84 km from the provincial centre of Batman and 10 km from the district centre of Sason.

== Population ==
Village population by year
2021	315
2020	317
2019	453
2018	235
2017	540
2016	730
2015	636
2014	492
2013	478
2012	636
2011	712
2010	775
2009	827
2008	802
2007	949
2000	843
1990	983
1935	117
