= Kavakdibi, Kozluk =

Village in Batman Province, Turkey

Kavakdibi
- Village
- Location within Turkey
- Coordinates: 38.168°N 41.363°E
- Country: Turkey
- Province: Batman
- District: Kozluk
- Population (2021): 717
- Time zone: UTC+3 (TRT)

Kavakdibi (Kurdish: Melkîşa) is a village in the Kozluk District of Batman Province in Turkey. The village is populated by Kurds of the Bekiran tribe and had a population of 717 in 2021.

The hamlet of Soğukpınar is attached to the village.
