= Akçalı, Kozluk =

Village in Batman Province, Turkey

Akçalı
- Village
- Location within Turkey
- Coordinates: 38°19′16″N 41°34′23″E
- Country: Turkey
- Province: Batman
- District: Kozluk
- Population (2021): 201
- Time zone: UTC+3 (TRT)

Akçalı is a village in the Kozluk District, Batman Province, Turkey. Its population is 201 (2021).
