= Geçitaltı, Kozluk =

Village in Batman Province, Turkey

Geçitaltı
- Village
- Location within Turkey
- Coordinates: 38.282°N 41.482°E
- Country: Turkey
- Province: Batman
- District: Kozluk
- Population (2021): 807
- Time zone: UTC+3 (TRT)

Geçitaltı (also known as Goh) is a village in the Kozluk District of Batman Province in Turkey. The village is populated by Arabs and had a population of 807 in 2021.

The hamlets of Çubuk, Gelşe, İkipınar, Mezarlık, Saraycık, Sugesiye and Topak are attached to the village.
