= Demiryol, Batman =

Village in Batman Province, Turkey

Demiryol
- Neighbourhood
- Location in Turkey
- Coordinates: 37°55′N 41°09′E
- Country: Turkey
- Province: Batman
- District: Batman
- Time zone: UTC+3 (TRT)

Demiryol (Syriac: Talmarğ) (Note: Also known as Telmergé, Telmerez, or Tilmerç.) is a neighbourhood in the Batman District of Batman Province in Turkey.

== History ==
Talmarğ (today called Demiryol) was historically inhabited by Syriac Orthodox Christians and Kurdish-speaking Armenians. In the Syriac Orthodox patriarchal register of dues of 1870, it was recorded that the village had 2 households, who paid 17 dues, and had one priest. There was a Syriac Orthodox church.

It was populated by 300 Syriacs in 1914, according to the list presented to the Paris Peace Conference by the Assyro-Chaldean delegation. It was located in the kaza (district) of Beşiri. The Armenians were attacked by the Belek, Bekran, Şegro, and other Kurdish tribes in May 1915 amidst the Armenian genocide.

== Bibliography ==
- Bcheiry, Iskandar (2009). The Syriac Orthodox Patriarchal Register of Dues of 1870: An Unpublished Historical Document from the Late Ottoman Period. Gorgias Press.
- Gaunt, David (2006). Massacres, Resistance, Protectors: Muslim-Christian Relations in Eastern Anatolia during World War I. Gorgias Press.
- Jongerden, Joost; Verheij, Jelle, eds. (2012). Social Relations in Ottoman Diyarbekir, 1870-1915. Brill.
- Kévorkian, Raymond (2011). The Armenian Genocide: A Complete History. I.B. Tauris.
