= Karaköy, Hasankeyf =

Village in Batman Province, Turkey

Karaköy
- Village
- Location within Turkey
- Coordinates: 37.683°N 41.411°E
- Country: Turkey
- Province: Batman
- District: Hasankeyf
- Population (2021): 238
- Time zone: UTC+3 (TRT)

Karaköy (Kurdish: Reşiye) is a village in the Hasankeyf District of Batman Province in Turkey. The village is populated by Kurds of the Reman tribe and had a population of 238 in 2021.
