= Çayhan, Kozluk =

Village in Batman Province, Turkey

Çayhan
- Village
- Location within Turkey
- Coordinates: 38.163°N 41.601°E
- Country: Turkey
- Province: Batman
- District: Kozluk
- Population (2021): 140
- Time zone: UTC+3 (TRT)

Çayhan (Kurdish: Çayxan) is a village in the Kozluk District of Batman Province in Turkey. The village had a population of 140 in 2021.
