= Cevizli, Sason =

Village in Batman Province, Turkey

Cevizli
- Village
- Location within Turkey
- Coordinates: 38.269°N 41.263°E
- Country: Turkey
- Province: Batman
- District: Sason
- Population (2021): 242
- Time zone: UTC+3 (TRT)

Cevizli (Kurdish: Cevzik) is a village in the Sason District, Batman Province, Turkey. The village is populated by Kurds of the Timok tribe and had a population of 242 in 2021.

The hamlets of Gölbaşı, Hasanbey (Arde Haseno) and Kayadibi (Mala Sore) are attached to the village.
