= Çaygeçit, Kozluk =

Village in Batman Province, Turkey

Çaygeçit
- Village
- Location within Turkey
- Coordinates: 38.058°N 41.484°E
- Country: Turkey
- Province: Batman
- District: Kozluk
- Population (2021): 104
- Time zone: UTC+3 (TRT)

Çaygeçit (Kurdish: Eynromî) is a village in the Kozluk District of Batman Province in Turkey. The village had a population of 104 in 2021.
