= Ulaşlı =

- Location within Azerbaijan
- Coordinates: 39°13′29″N 46°42′05″E
- Country: Azerbaijan
- Rayon: Qubadli
- Time zone: UTC+4 (AZT)
  - Summer (DST): UTC+5 (AZT)

Ulaşlı (also, Ulashly) is a village in the Qubadli Rayon of Azerbaijan.
