= Kavaklı, Sason =

Village in Batman Province, Turkey

Kavaklı
- Village
- Location within Turkey
- Coordinates: 38.275°N 41.255°E
- Country: Turkey
- Province: Batman
- District: Sason
- Population (2021): 158
- Time zone: UTC+3 (TRT)

Kavaklı (Kurdish: Helîn) is a village in the Sason District, Batman Province, Turkey. The village is populated by Kurds of the Timok tribe and had a population of 158 in 2021.

The hamlets of Koçak (Çemê Baranê) and Tepecik (Çemê Kesê) are attached to the village.
