= Uzunçayır, Kozluk =

Village in Batman Province, Turkey

Uzunçayır
- Village
- Location within Turkey
- Coordinates: 38.090°N 41.296°E
- Country: Turkey
- Province: Batman
- District: Kozluk
- Population (2021): 389
- Time zone: UTC+3 (TRT)

Uzunçayır (Kurdish: Mîlikan) is a village in the Kozluk District, Batman Province, Turkey. The village is populated by Kurds of the Reşkotan tribe and had a population of 389 in 2021.

The hamlets of Aksaray, Başeğmez, Bulgurlu, Esentepe, Gülovası, Hasköy, Mercan, Sahabe, Seyhan, Uzunyayla, Üzümlü and Yeşilköy.
