= Yeniçağlar, Kozluk =

Village in Batman Province, Turkey

Yeniçağlar
- Village
- Location within Turkey
- Coordinates: 38.146°N 41.237°E
- Country: Turkey
- Province: Batman
- District: Kozluk
- Population (2021): 1,606
- Time zone: UTC+3 (TRT)

Yeniçağlar (Kurdish: Zîlan) is a village in the Kozluk District of Batman Province in Turkey. The village is populated by Kurds of the Bekiran tribe and had a population of 1,606 in 2021.

The hamlet of Bacak is attached to the village.
