= Kıratlı, Kozluk =

Village in Batman Province, Turkey

Kıratlı
- Village
- Location within Turkey
- Coordinates: 38.218°N 41.381°E
- Country: Turkey
- Province: Batman
- District: Kozluk
- Population (2021): 382
- Time zone: UTC+3 (TRT)

Kıratlı (formerly Yukarıkıratlı, Kurdish: Baştirim) is a village in the Kozluk District, Batman Province, Turkey. Its population is 382 (2021).
