= Çalışırlar, Sason =

Village in Batman Province, Turkey

Çalışırlar
- Village
- Location within Turkey
- Coordinates: 38.382°N 41.492°E
- Country: Turkey
- Province: Batman
- District: Sason
- Population (2021): 296
- Time zone: UTC+3 (TRT)

Çalışırlar is a village in the Sason District, Batman Province, Turkey. The village had a population of 296 in 2021.
