= Konaklı, Kozluk =

Village in Batman Province, Turkey

Konaklı
- Village
- Location within Turkey
- Coordinates: 38.131°N 41.272°E
- Country: Turkey
- Province: Batman
- District: Kozluk
- Population (2021): 245
- Time zone: UTC+3 (TRT)

Konaklı (Kurdish: Qeynter) is a village in the Kozluk District, Batman Province, Turkey. The village is populated by Kurds of the Reşkotan tribe and had a population of 245 in 2021.
