= Kaletepe, Kozluk =

Village in Batman Province, Turkey

Kaletepe
- Village
- Location within Turkey
- Coordinates: 38.245°N 41.240°E
- Country: Turkey
- Province: Batman
- District: Kozluk
- Population (2021): 724
- Time zone: UTC+3 (TRT)

Kaletepe (Kurdish: Dehlikê) is a village in the Kozluk District of Batman Province in Turkey. The village is populated by Kurds of the Bekiran tribe and had a population of 724 in 2021.

The hamlets of İnanlı and Yeşilöz are attached to the village.
