= Akalın, Hasankeyf =

Village in Batman Province, Turkey

Akalın
- Village
- Location within Turkey
- Coordinates: 37.694°N 41.557°E
- Country: Turkey
- Province: Batman
- District: Hasankeyf
- Population (2021): 232
- Time zone: UTC+3 (TRT)

Akalın (Kurdish: Alînê) is a village in the Hasankeyf District of Batman Province in Turkey. The village is populated by Kurds of the Derhawî tribe and had a population of 232 in 2021.
