= Karaoğlak, Kozluk =

Village in Batman Province, Turkey

Karaoğlak
- Village
- Location within Turkey
- Coordinates: 38.109°N 41.387°E
- Country: Turkey
- Province: Batman
- District: Kozluk
- Population (2021): 432
- Time zone: UTC+3 (TRT)

Karaoğlak (Kurdish: Qudeyr) is a village in the Kozluk District, Batman Province, Turkey. Its population is 432 (2021).

The hamlet of Merce is attached to the village.
