= Danagöze, Kozluk =

Village in Batman Province, Turkey

Danagözü
- Village
- Location within Turkey
- Coordinates: 38.237°N 41.318°E
- Country: Turkey
- Province: Batman
- District: Kozluk
- Population (2021): 648
- Time zone: UTC+3 (TRT)

Danagözü (Kurdish: Baqînê) is a village in the Kozluk District of Batman Province in Turkey. The village is populated by Kurds of the Bekiran tribe and had a population of 648 in 2021.

The hamlets of Arslanlı, Çay and Taşoluk are attached to the village.
