= Yakaköy, Hasankeyf =

Village in Batman Province, Turkey

Yakaköy
- Village
- Location within Turkey
- Coordinates: 37.651°N 41.579°E
- Country: Turkey
- Province: Batman
- District: Hasankeyf
- Population (2021): 218
- Time zone: UTC+3 (TRT)

Yakaköy (Kurdish: Xanikan, Xanika) is a village in the Hasankeyf District of Batman Province in Turkey. The village is populated by Kurds of the Bêcirmanî tribe and had a population of 218 in 2021.
