= Oyuktaş, Kozluk =

Village in Batman Province, Turkey

Oyuktaş
- Village
- Location within Turkey
- Coordinates: 38.044°N 41.507°E
- Country: Turkey
- Province: Batman
- District: Kozluk
- Population (2021): 648
- Time zone: UTC+3 (TRT)

Oyuktaş (Kurdish: Şikeftan) is a village in the Kozluk District, Batman Province, Turkey. Its population is 648 (2021).

The hamlet of Yeşilyurt is attached to the village.
