= Geçitli, Sason =

Village in Batman Province, Turkey

Geçitli
- Village
- Location within Turkey
- Coordinates: 38.385°N 41.427°E
- Country: Turkey
- Province: Batman
- District: Sason
- Population (2021): 388
- Time zone: UTC+3 (TRT)

Geçitli is a village in the Sason District, Batman Province, Turkey. The village is populated by Arabs and had a population of 388 in 2021.
