= Yanıkkaya, Kozluk =

Village in Batman Province, Turkey

Yanıkkaya
- Village
- Location within Turkey
- Coordinates: 38.226°N 41.300°E
- Country: Turkey
- Province: Batman
- District: Kozluk
- Population (2021): 940
- Time zone: UTC+3 (TRT)

Yanıkkaya (Kurdish: Smaîlka) is a village in the Kozluk District of Batman Province in Turkey. The village is populated by Kurds of the Bekiran tribe and had a population of 940 in 2021.

The hamlets of Gertavi and Sarıkuş are attached to the village.
