= Aydınkonak, Batman =

Village in Batman Province, Turkey

Aydınkonak
- Neighbourhood
- Location in Turkey
- Coordinates: 37.89461°N 41.16405°E
- Country: Turkey
- Province: Batman
- District: Batman
- Time zone: UTC+3 (TRT)

Aydınkonak (Syriac: Kūrik) (Note: Also known as Körük, Korik, Körükköy, K’orig, Gorik’, Korig, or Gorik.) is a neighbourhood in the District of Batman, Batman Province, Turkey. As of 2011, it had a population of 1578 people.

== History ==
Kūrik (today called Aydınkonak) was historically inhabited by Syriac Orthodox Christians and Kurdish-speaking Armenians. In the Syriac Orthodox patriarchal register of dues of 1870, it was recorded that the village had 10 households, who paid 24 dues, and did not have a church or a priest. There were 11 Armenian hearths in 1880. There was an Armenian church of Surb Hakob.

It is tentatively identified with the village of Kureké, which was populated by 200 Syriacs in 1914, according to the list presented to the Paris Peace Conference by the Assyro-Chaldean delegation. It was located in the kaza (district) of Beşiri. The Armenians were attacked by the Belek, Bekran, Şegro, and other Kurdish tribes in May 1915 amidst the Armenian genocide.

== Bibliography ==
- Bcheiry, Iskandar (2009). The Syriac Orthodox Patriarchal Register of Dues of 1870: An Unpublished Historical Document from the Late Ottoman Period. Gorgias Press.
- Gaunt, David (2006). Massacres, Resistance, Protectors: Muslim-Christian Relations in Eastern Anatolia during World War I. Gorgias Press.
- Jongerden, Joost; Verheij, Jelle, eds. (2012). Social Relations in Ottoman Diyarbekir, 1870-1915. Brill.
- Kévorkian, Raymond H. (2006). "Demographic Changes in the Armenian Population of Diarbekir, 1895-1914". In Richard G. Hovannisian (ed.). Armenian Tigranakert/Diarbekir and Edessa/Urfa. Mazda Publishers.
- Kévorkian, Raymond (2011). The Armenian Genocide: A Complete History. I.B. Tauris.
