= Çamlıca, Kozluk =

Village in Batman Province, Turkey

Çamlıca
- Village
- Location within Turkey
- Coordinates: 38.103°N 41.427°E
- Country: Turkey
- Province: Batman
- District: Kozluk
- Population (2021): 189
- Time zone: UTC+3 (TRT)

Çamlıca (Kurdish: Eyn Çirik) is a village in the Kozluk District of Batman Province in Turkey. The village had a population of 189 in 2021.
