= İncirli, Hasankeyf =

Village in Batman Province, Turkey

İncirli
- Village
- Location within Turkey
- Coordinates: 37.725°N 41.568°E
- Country: Turkey
- Province: Batman
- District: Hasankeyf
- Population (2021): 177
- Time zone: UTC+3 (TRT)

İncirli (Kurdish: Derhawê; Syriac: Dēr Haf) (Note: Alternatively transliterated as Deïr-Avv or Derhaf.) is a village in the Hasankeyf District of Batman Province in Turkey. The village is populated by Kurds of the Derhawî tribe and had a population of 177 in 2021. It is located in the historic region of Tur Abdin.

== History ==
Derhaf (today called İncirli) was historically inhabited by Syriac Orthodox Christians. In 1914, there were 150 Syriacs at the village, as per the list presented to the Paris Peace Conference by the Assyro-Chaldean delegation. It was located in the kaza of Midyat.

== Bibliography ==
- Gaunt, David (2006). Massacres, Resistance, Protectors: Muslim-Christian Relations in Eastern Anatolia during World War I. Gorgias Press.
- Jongerden, Joost; Verheij, Jelle, eds. (2012). Social Relations in Ottoman Diyarbekir, 1870-1915. Brill.
- Tan, Altan (2018). Turabidin'den Berriye'ye. Aşiretler - Dinler - Diller - Kültürler (in Turkish). Pak Ajans Yayincilik Turizm Ve Diş Ticaret Limited şirketi. ISBN 9789944360944.
- Wießner, Gernot (1993). Christliche Kultbauten im Ṭūr ʻAbdīn (in German). Vol. IV. Harrassowitz Verlag.
