= Kolludere, Kozluk =

Village in Batman Province, Turkey

Kolludere
- Village
- Location within Turkey
- Coordinates: 38.193°N 41.549°E
- Country: Turkey
- Province: Batman
- District: Kozluk
- Population (2021): 56
- Time zone: UTC+3 (TRT)

Kolludere (Kurdish: Nawalan) is a village in the Kozluk District of Batman Province in Turkey. The village is populated by Kurds and had a population of 56 in 2021.

The hamlets of Akkuş, Çayırlı and Yolveren are attached to the village.
