= Tosunpınar, Kozluk =

Village in Batman Province, Turkey

Tosunpınar
- Village
- Location within Turkey
- Coordinates: 38.223°N 41.482°E
- Country: Turkey
- Province: Batman
- District: Kozluk
- Population (2021): 597
- Time zone: UTC+3 (TRT)

Tosunpınar, formerly Aynras or Aynaras (Armenian: Այնարաս), is a village in the Kozluk District, Batman Province, Turkey. It harboured an Armenian population before the Armenian genocide and is today populated by Arabs. Its population was 597 in 2021; of those 295 were men and 302 were women.

The hamlets of Armağan, Derincik and İncirli are attached to the village.
