= Kumluca, Hasankeyf =

Village in Batman Province, Turkey

Kumluca
- Village
- Location within Turkey
- Coordinates: 37.731°N 41.266°E
- Country: Turkey
- Province: Batman
- District: Hasankeyf
- Population (2021): 28
- Time zone: UTC+3 (TRT)

Kumluca (Kurdish: Merdîs; Syriac: Mardīsah) is a village in the Hasankeyf District of Batman Province in Turkey. The village is populated by Kurds and had a population of 28 in 2021.

The hamlets of Altıhan and Taşlı are attached to the village.

== History ==
Mardīsah (today called Kumluca) was historically inhabited by Syriac Orthodox Christians. In the Syriac Orthodox patriarchal register of dues of 1870, it was recorded that the village had 7 households, who did not pay any dues, and did not have a church or a priest.

It was burned by authorities in the early 1990s during the Kurdish–Turkish conflict.

== Bibliography ==
- Bcheiry, Iskandar (2009). The Syriac Orthodox Patriarchal Register of Dues of 1870: An Unpublished Historical Document from the Late Ottoman Period. Gorgias Press.
- Duran, Medeni (2006). Osmanlı'dan Şemdinli'ye JİTEM tarihi (in Turkish). Berçem Yayıncılık.
