= Çakırpınar, Sason =

Village in Batman Province, Turkey

Çakırpınar
- Village
- Location within Turkey
- Coordinates: 38.451°N 41.540°E
- Country: Turkey
- Province: Batman
- District: Sason
- Population (2021): 537
- Time zone: UTC+3 (TRT)

Çakırpınar is a village in the Sason District, Batman Province, Turkey. The village is populated by Arabs and had a population of 537 in 2021.

The hamlets of Arpacık, Çatmalı, Dağdelen, Dağlıca, Deliktaş, Konaklı, Yazlıca and Yongalı are attached to the village.
