= Tepebaşı, Hasankeyf =

Village in Batman Province, Turkey

Tepebaşı
- Village
- Location within Turkey
- Coordinates: 37.681°N 41.342°E
- Country: Turkey
- Province: Batman
- District: Hasankeyf
- Population (2021): 164
- Time zone: UTC+3 (TRT)

Tepebaşı (Kurdish: Gundê Diyar) is a village in the Hasankeyf District of Batman Province in Turkey. The village is populated by Kurds of the Reman tribe and had a population of 164 in 2021.
