= Ortaca, Kozluk =

Village in Batman Province, Turkey

Ortaca
- Village
- Location within Turkey
- Coordinates: 38.048°N 41.281°E
- Country: Turkey
- Province: Batman
- District: Kozluk
- Population (2021): 290
- Time zone: UTC+3 (TRT)

Ortaca (Kurdish: Celdekan) is a village in the Kozluk District, Batman Province, Turkey. The village is populated by Kurds of the Reşkotan tribe and had a population of 290 in 2021.

The hamlet of Söğütlüpınar are attached to the village.
