= Soğanlı, Sason =

Village in Batman Province, Turkey

Soğanlı
- Village
- Location within Turkey
- Coordinates: 38.402°N 41.412°E
- Country: Turkey
- Province: Batman
- District: Sason
- Population (2021): 82
- Time zone: UTC+3 (TRT)

Soğanlı is a village in the Sason District, Batman Province, Turkey. The village is populated by Arabs and had a population of 82 in 2021.

The hamlets of Beypisiye and Kısrak are attached to the village.
