= Düvecik, Kozluk =

Village in Batman Province, Turkey

Dövecik
- Village
- Location within Turkey
- Coordinates: 38.093°N 41.220°E
- Country: Turkey
- Province: Batman
- District: Kozluk
- Population (2021): 146
- Time zone: UTC+3 (TRT)

Düvecik (Kurdish: Malê Gir) is a village in the Kozluk District, Batman Province, Turkey. The village is populated by Kurds of the Reşkotan tribe and had a population of 146 in 2021.
