= Örenağıl, Sason =

Village in Batman Province, Turkey

Örenağıl
- Village
- Location within Turkey
- Coordinates: 38.418°N 41.511°E
- Country: Turkey
- Province: Batman
- District: Sason
- Population (2021): 440
- Time zone: UTC+3 (TRT)

Örenağıl is a village in the Sason District, Batman Province, Turkey. The village is populated by Arabs and had a population of 440 in 2021.

The hamlets of Çukurca, Kayadibi, Keçiler and Yedigöz (Kurdikan) are attached to the village. Yedigöz is populated by Kurds, while the other hamlets are populated by Arabs.
