= Eskice, Kozluk =

Village in Batman Province, Turkey

Eskice
- Village
- Location within Turkey
- Coordinates: 38.187°N 41.258°E
- Country: Turkey
- Province: Batman
- District: Kozluk
- Population (2021): 451
- Time zone: UTC+3 (TRT)

Eskice (Kurdish: Sûcê, Xoxê) is a village in the Kozluk District of Batman Province in Turkey. The village is populated by Kurds of the Bekiran tribe and had a population of 451 in 2021.

The hamlets of Satı and Seyiler are attached to the village.
