= Kelhasan, Sason =

Village in Batman Province, Turkey

Kelhasan
- Village
- Location within Turkey
- Coordinates: 38.304°N 41.378°E
- Country: Turkey
- Province: Batman
- District: Sason
- Population (2021): 285
- Time zone: UTC+3 (TRT)

Kelhasan (Kurdish: Kelhesna) is a village in the Sason District, Batman Province, Turkey. The village is populated by Kurds of the Timok tribe and had a population of 285 in 2021.
