= Yazpınar, Kozluk =

Village in Batman Province, Turkey

Yazpınar
- Village
- Location within Turkey
- Coordinates: 38.1816°N 41.6302°E
- Country: Turkey
- Province: Batman
- District: Kozluk
- Population (2021): 183
- Time zone: UTC+3 (TRT)

Yazpınar (Kurdish: Ceznê) is a village in the Kozluk District, Batman Province, Turkey. Its population is 183 (2021).

The hamlet of Dolutaş is attached to the village.
