= Beşkonak, Kozluk =

Village in Batman Province, Turkey

Beşkonak
- Village
- Location within Turkey
- Coordinates: 38.231°N 41.626°E
- Country: Turkey
- Province: Batman
- District: Kozluk
- Population (2021): 192
- Time zone: UTC+3 (TRT)

Beşkonak (Kurdish: Gola) is a village in the Kozluk District of Batman Province in Turkey. The village had a population of 192 in 2021.

The hamlets of Ağılbaşı, Erince, Esenlik, Gürsu, Süleymanlar and Şeman are attached to the village.
