= Yapaklı, Kozluk =

Village in Batman Province, Turkey

Yapaklı
- Village
- Location within Turkey
- Coordinates: 38.100°N 41.489°E
- Country: Turkey
- Province: Batman
- District: Kozluk
- Population (2021): 336
- Time zone: UTC+3 (TRT)

Yapaklı (Kurdish: Pelkê) is a village in the Kozluk District of Batman Province in Turkey. The village is populated by Kurds of the Bekiran tribe and had a population of 336 in 2021.
