= Kaleyolu, Sason =

Village in Batman Province, Turkey

Kaleyolu
- Village
- Location within Turkey
- Coordinates: 38.475°N 41.457°E
- Country: Turkey
- Province: Batman
- District: Sason
- Population (2021): 435
- Time zone: UTC+3 (TRT)

Kaleyolu (Kurdish: Bozika) is a village in the Sason District, Batman Province, Turkey. The village is populated by Kurds and had a population of 435 in 2021.

The hamlet of Yamanlar (Kurdish: Mitirban) is attached to the village.
