= Gürpınar, Kozluk =

Gürpınar
- Village
- Location within Turkey
- Coordinates: 38.0845°N 41.4270°E
- Country: Turkey
- Province: Batman
- District: Kozluk
- Population (2021): 554
- Time zone: UTC+3 (TRT)

Gürpınar (Kurdish: Mirarika jêrin) is a village in the Kozluk District, Batman Province, Turkey. Its population is 554 (2021).

The hamlets of Başpınar, Gültepe and Ulucanlar are attached to the village.
