= Dereköy, Sason =

Dereköy
- Village
- Location within Turkey
- Coordinates: 38.356°N 41.389°E
- Country: Turkey
- Province: Batman
- District: Sason
- Population (2021): 615
- Time zone: UTC+3 (TRT)

Dereköy is a village in the Sason District, Batman Province, Turkey. Its population is 615 (2021).

The hamlet of Şahinli is attached to the village.
