= Dereiçi, Sason =

Village in Batman Province, Turkey

Dereiçi
- Village
- Location within Turkey
- Coordinates: 38.310°N 41.317°E
- Country: Turkey
- Province: Batman
- District: Sason
- Population (2021): 222
- Time zone: UTC+3 (TRT)

Dereiçi is a village in the Sason District, Batman Province, Turkey. The village had a population of 222 in 2021.
