= Derince, Kozluk =

Village in Batman Province, Turkey

Derince
- Village
- Location within Turkey
- Coordinates: 38.136°N 41.627°E
- Country: Turkey
- Province: Batman
- District: Kozluk
- Population (2021): 278
- Time zone: UTC+3 (TRT)

Derince (Kurdish: Korir) is a village in the Kozluk District, Batman Province, Turkey. Its population is 278 (2021).
