= Umurlu, Sason =

Village in Batman Province, Turkey

Umurlu
- Village
- Location within Turkey
- Coordinates: 38.313°N 41.303°E
- Country: Turkey
- Province: Batman
- District: Sason
- Population (2021): 460
- Time zone: UTC+3 (TRT)

Umurlu (Kurdish: Taraş) is a village in the Sason District, Batman Province, Turkey. The village is populated by Kurds and had a population of 460 in 2021.

The hamlet of Haydar is attached to the village.
