= Altıdere, Sason =

Village in Batman Province, Turkey

Altıdere
- Village
- Location within Turkey
- Coordinates: 38.416°N 41.522°E
- Country: Turkey
- Province: Batman
- District: Sason
- Population (2021): 212
- Time zone: UTC+3 (TRT)

Altıdere is a village in the Sason District of Batman Province, Turkey. The village is populated by Arabs and had a population of 212 in 2021.
