= Gündüzlü, Kozluk =

Village in Batman Province, Turkey

Gündüzlü
- Village
- Location within Turkey
- Coordinates: 38.207°N 41.407°E
- Country: Turkey
- Province: Batman
- District: Kozluk
- Population (2021): 190
- Time zone: UTC+3 (TRT)

Gündüzlü (Kurdish: Mezra Xalik) is a village in the Kozluk District, Batman Province, Turkey. Its population is 190 (2021).

The hamlet of Kalkancık is attached to the village.
