= Kozluk =

- Municipality
- Location in Turkey
- Coordinates: 38°11′40″N 41°29′28″E
- Country: Turkey
- Province: Batman
- District: Kozluk

Government
  - Mayor: Mehmet Veysi Işık (AKP)
- Population (2021): 27,825
- Time zone: UTC+3 (TRT)
- Website: www.kozluk.bel.tr

Kozluk (Kurdish: Hezzo, Armenian: Հազզո, romanized: Hazzo) is a town and seat of Kozluk District in Batman Province, Turkey. The town had a population of 27,825 in 2021. The mayor is Mehmet Veysi Işık (AKP).

It is divided into the neighborhoods of Ağaçlık, Aşağı Güneşli, Bahçeli, Beşevler, Çaybaşı, Değirmendere, Hamam, İslambey, Kale, Karpuzlu, Kavaklı, Kemalpaşa, Komando, Köprübaşı, Pınarbaşı, Selahaddini Eyyübi, Şemdinağa, Tepecik, Tepeüstü, Yamaçlı, Yenimahalle, Yeşiltepe, Yolaltı, Yolüstü and Yukarı Güneşli.
