= Büyükdere, Hasankeyf =

Village in Batman Province, Turkey

Büyükdere
- Village
- Location within Turkey
- Coordinates: 37.674°N 41.541°E
- Country: Turkey
- Province: Batman
- District: Hasankeyf
- Population (2021): 179
- Time zone: UTC+3 (TRT)

Büyükdere (Kurdish: Gerê) is a village in the Hasankeyf District of Batman Province in Turkey. The village is populated by Kurds of the Derhawî tribe and had a population of 179 in 2021.
