= Çevrecik, Kozluk =

Village in Batman Province, Turkey

Çevrecik
- Village
- Location within Turkey
- Coordinates: 38.246°N 41.284°E
- Country: Turkey
- Province: Batman
- District: Kozluk
- Population (2021): 388
- Time zone: UTC+3 (TRT)

Çevrecik (Kurdish: Kanîyaberê) is a village in the Kozluk District of Batman Province in Turkey. The village is populated by Kurds of the Bekiran tribe and had a population of 388 in 2021.
