= Bekirhan, Kozluk =

Town in Batman Province, Turkey

Bekirhan
- Village
- Location in Turkey
- Coordinates: 38.139°N 41.296°E
- Country: Turkey
- Province: Batman
- District: Kozluk
- Population (2021): 2,830
- Time zone: UTC+3 (TRT)

Bekirhan (Kurdish: Kanîyahenê) is a town (belde) in the Kozluk District of Batman Province in Turkey. The town is populated by Kurds of the Bekiran tribe and had a population of 2,380 in 2021.
