= Duygulu, Kozluk =

Duygulu
- Village
- Location within Turkey
- Coordinates: 38.1944°N 41.4911°E
- Country: Turkey
- Province: Batman
- District: Kozluk
- Population (2021): 256
- Time zone: UTC+3 (TRT)

Duygulu (Kurdish: Apikan) is a village in the Kozluk District, Batman Province, Turkey. The village is populated by Kurds of the Reşkotan tribe and had a population of 256 in 2021.

The hamlets of Metinga and Yolbaşı are attached to the village.
