= Ulaşlı, Kozluk =

Village in Batman Province, Turkey

Ulaşlı
- Village
- Location within Turkey
- Coordinates: 38.175°N 41.320°E
- Country: Turkey
- Province: Batman
- District: Kozluk
- Population (2021): 1,006
- Time zone: UTC+3 (TRT)

Ulaşlı (Kurdish: Şelmo) is a village in the Kozluk District of Batman Province in Turkey. The village is populated by Kurds of the Bekiran tribe and had a population of 1,006 in 2021.

The hamlets of Aslanlı, Camili, Hürriyet, Kale, Keklikpınar, Tomurcak and Zorluca are attached to the village.
