= Dörtbölük, Sason =

Village in Batman Province, Turkey

Dörtbölük
- Village
- Location within Turkey
- Coordinates: 38.453°N 41.408°E
- Country: Turkey
- Province: Batman
- District: Sason
- Population (2021): 545
- Time zone: UTC+3 (TRT)

Dörtbölük (Kurdish: Cemalan) is a village in the Sason District, Batman Province, Turkey. The village is populated by Arabs and by Kurds of the Xiyan tribe and had a population of 545 in 2021.

The hamlets of Ambarcı, Bozdoğan, Dibek and Yağcılı (Kîstax) are attached to the village. The hamlets of Ambarcı, Bozdoğan and Dibek are populated by Arabs, while Yağcılı is populated by Kurds.
