= Kozluk District =

District of Batman Province, Turkey

- District
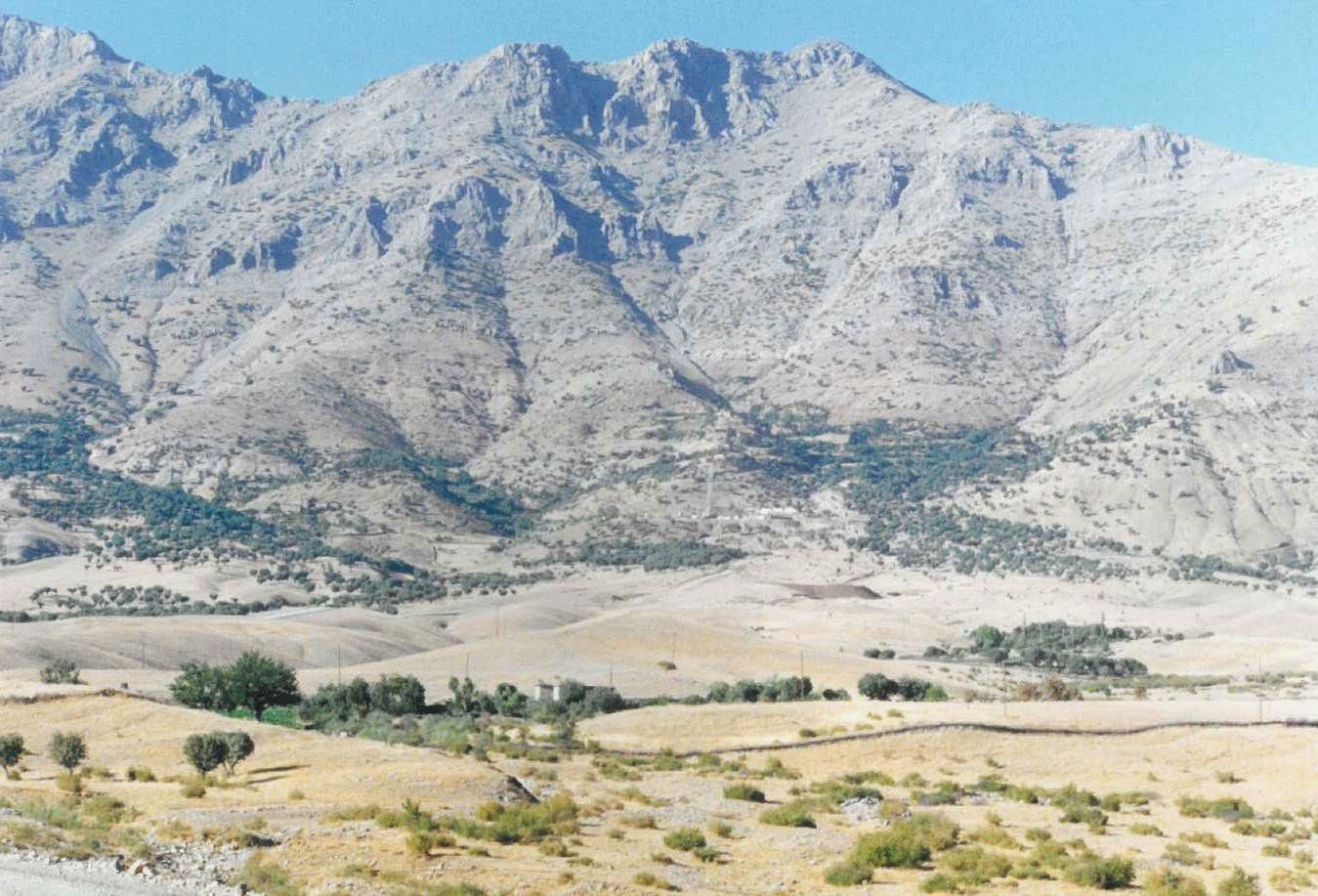

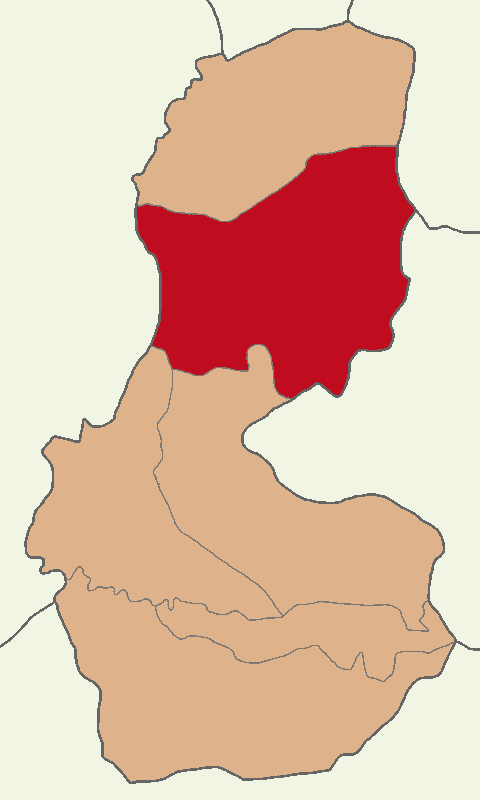
- Map showing Kozluk District in Batman Province

- Location within Turkey
- Coordinates: 38°12′N 41°29′E
- Country: Turkey
- Province: Batman
- Seat: Kozluk

Government
  - Kaymakam: Ekrem Güngör
- Area: 1,101 km^{2} (425 sq mi)
- Population (2021): 60,953
  - Density: 55.36/km^{2} (143.4/sq mi)
- Time zone: UTC+3 (TRT)
- Website: www.kozluk.gov.tr

Kozluk District is a district of Batman Province in Turkey. Its seat is the town Kozluk. Its area is 1,101 km^{2}, and the district had a population of 60,953 in 2021. The district was established in 1938. It is populated by Kurds and Arabs.

== Composition ==
There are two municipalities in Kozluk District:

- Bekirhan
- Kozluk

There are 69 villages in Kozluk District:

- Akçakışla
- Akçalı
- Alıçlı
- Arıkaya
- Armutlu
- Aşağıkıratlı
- Beşkonak
- Beybağı
- Bölükkonak
- Çamlıca
- Çaygeçit
- Çayhan
- Çayönü
- Çevrecik
- Danagöze
- Dereköy
- Derince
- Dövecik
- Duygulu
- Eskice
- Geçitaltı
- Geyikli
- Güllüce
- Gümüşörgü
- Gündüzlü
- Günyayla
- Gürpınar
- İnişli
- Kahveci
- Kaletepe
- Kamışlı
- Karaoğlak
- Karpuzlu
- Karşıyaka
- Kavakdibi
- Kayadibi
- Kıratlı
- Koçaklı
- Kolludere
- Konaklı
- Kumlupınar
- Örensu
- Ortaca
- Oyuktaş
- Parmakkapı
- Pınarhisar
- Samanyolu
- Seyitler
- Seyrantepe
- Taşlıdere
- Taşlık
- Tosunpınar
- Tuzlagözü
- Ulaşlı
- Uzunçayır
- Uzunyazı
- Ünsaldı
- Yanıkkaya
- Yankılı
- Yapaklı
- Yayalar
- Yazılı
- Yazpınar
- Yedibölük
- Yeniçağlar
- Yenidoğan
- Yenidoğan Ase
- Yıldızlı
- Ziyaret

The district encompasses 115 hamlets.
