= Gümüşörgü, Kozluk =

Village in Batman Province, Turkey

Gümüşörgü
- Village
- Location within Turkey
- Coordinates: 38.265°N 41.391°E
- Country: Turkey
- Province: Batman
- District: Kozluk
- Population (2021): 326
- Time zone: UTC+3 (TRT)

Gümüşörgü (Kurdish: Timoq) is a village in the Kozluk District of Batman Province in Turkey. The village is populated by Kurds and had a population of 326 in 2021.

The hamlet of Yamaçlı is attached to the village.
