= Yenidoğan, Kozluk =

Village in Batman Province, Turkey

Yenidoğan
- Village
- Location within Turkey
- Coordinates: 38.082°N 41.241°E
- Country: Turkey
- Province: Batman
- District: Kozluk
- Population (2021): 42
- Time zone: UTC+3 (TRT)

Yenidoğan (also known as Bekirhan Yenidoğan, Kurdish: Şabê) is a village in the Kozluk District, Batman Province, Turkey. The village is populated by Kurds of the Reşkotan tribe and had a population of 42 in 2021.
