= Sason District =

District of Batman Province, Turkey

- District
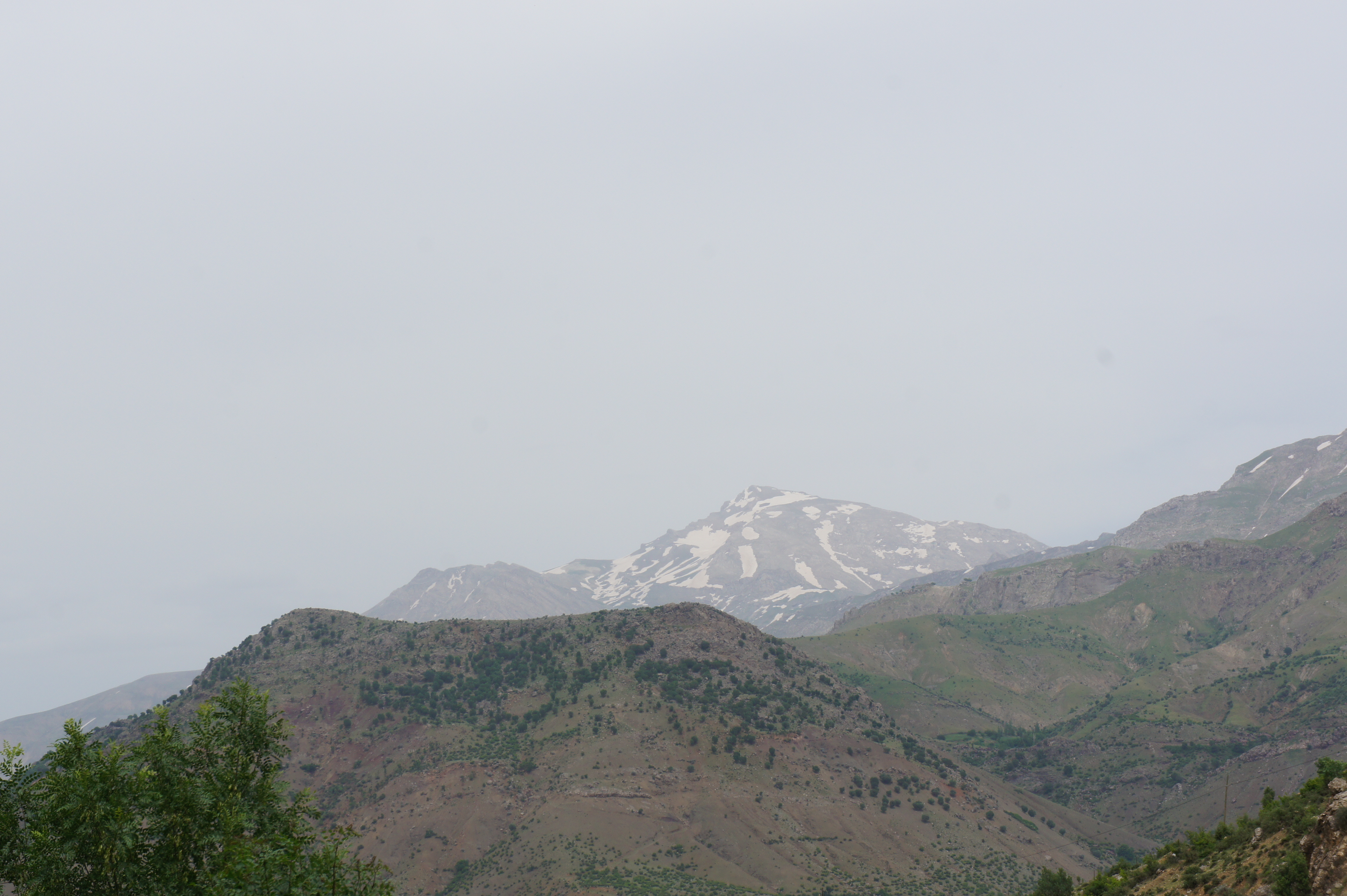
- Mt. Mereto (with snow), Sason

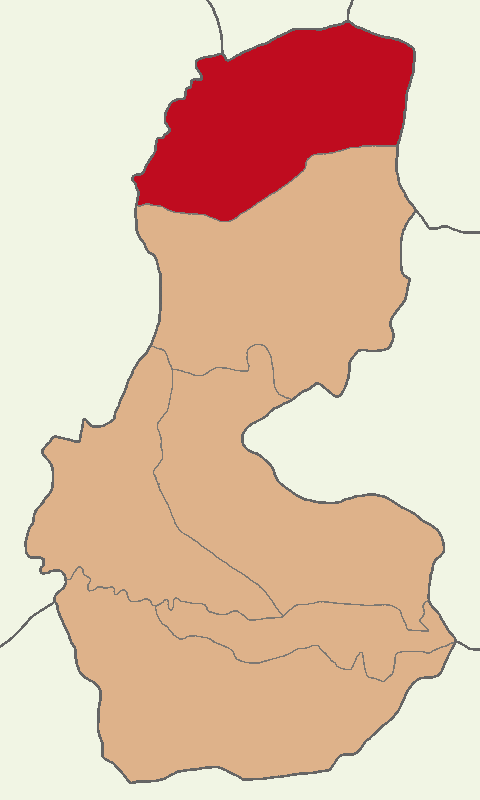
- Map showing Sason District in Batman Province

- Location within Turkey
- Coordinates: 38°23′N 41°24′E
- Country: Turkey
- Province: Batman
- Seat: Sason

Government
  - Kaymakam: Murat Mete
- Area: 706 km^{2} (273 sq mi)
- Population (2021): 30,182
  - Density: 42.8/km^{2} (111/sq mi)
- Time zone: UTC+3 (TRT)
- Website: www.sason.gov.tr

Sason District is a district of the Batman Province of Turkey. Its seat is the town Sason. Its area is 706 km^{2}, and its population is 30,182 (2021). It was formerly part of the sanjak of Siirt, which was in Diyarbakır vilayet until 1880 and in Bitlis Vilayet in 1892. Later it became part of Muş sanjak in Bitlis vilayet, and remained part of Muş until 1927. It was one of the districts of Siirt province until 1993. The boundaries of the district varied considerably in time. The current borders are not the same as in the 19th century, when the district of Sasun was situated more to the north (mostly territory now included in the central district of Muş).

== Composition ==
There are two municipalities in Sason District:

- Sason
- Yücebağ

There are 54 villages in Sason District:

- Acar
- Altındere
- Balbaşı
- Bayramlar
- Boğazkapı
- Cevizli
- Çağlı
- Çakırpınar
- Çalışırlar
- Çayırlı
- Çınarlı
- Dağçatı
- Dereiçi
- Dereköy
- Derince
- Dikbayır
- Dörtbölük
- Ekinlik
- Ergünü
- Erikli
- Geçitli
- gnçler
- Gürgenli
- Güvercinlik
- Heybeli
- İncesu
- Kaleyolu
- Karameşe
- Karayün
- Kaşyayla
- Kavaklı
- Kayadüzü
- Kelhasan
- Kilimli
- Kilis
- Kınalı
- Köprübaşı
- Kulaksız
- Meşeli
- Örenağıl
- Sarıyayla
- Soğanlı
- Taşyuva
- Topluca
- Turnalı
- Umurlu
- Yakabağ
- Yeniköy
- Yiğitler
- Yolüstü
- Yuvalar
- Yürekli
- Yuvalıçay
- Ziyaret
