= Orica (disambiguation) =

Orica is an Australian mining, tunnelling, explosives company.

Orica may also refer to:

- Orica, Francisco Morazán, Honduras
- Orica House, East Melbourne, Victoria, Australia; the headquarters of the Orica company
- Orica (beetle), a monotypic beetle genus composed of O. albovirgulata
- Bathyphantes orica (B. orica), a species of spider
- Yorica, a Coahuiltecan tribe sometimes spelled Orica

== See also ==
- Orica-Scott, several different pro-cycling teams
- Orica-GreenEDGE, a men's pro-cycling team
- Orica-AIS, a women's pro-cycling team
- Arica (disambiguation)
- Aurica (disambiguation)
