= Arica (disambiguation) =

Arica is a city in northern Chile.

Arica may also refer to:

== Places ==
- Arica Airport (ACM), Arica, Chile
- Arica y Parinacota Region, Chile
- Arica Province, Chile
- Arica, Amazonas, Colombia
- Puerto Arica, Colombia
- Arica Province (Peru)
- Arıca, Gercüş, Turkey
- Arıca, Vezirköprü, Turkey

== Military ==
- BAP Arica (SS-36), Peruvian submarine
- Battle of Arica, War of the Pacific, 1880

== Given name ==
- Arica Carter (born 1996), American basketball player
- Arica Himmel (born 2005), American actress

== Other uses ==
- Arica (Martian crater), a crater on Mars
- Arica (moth), Azamora, a genus of snout moths
- Arica School, a philosophical school founded by Bolivian philosopher Oscar Ichazo in 1968

== See also ==
- Arıca (disambiguation)
- Aurica (disambiguation)
