= Nurlu =

Nurlu may refer to:

== People ==
- Ceren Nurlu (born 1992), Turkish football player

== Places ==
- Nurlu, Somme, France
- Nurlu, Gercüş, Turkey
