= Sargin =

Sargin, Šargin, Sargın or Shargin may refer to

- Sargın, Gercüş, a village in Turkey
- Nada Šargin (born 1977), Serbian actress
- Yuri Shargin (born 1960), Russian cosmonaut
- Sargin, ancient name of Gilgit, a city in Gilgit-Baltistan, Pakistan
