= 2018 Gercüş bombing =

Terrorist incident in Turkey

- Part of the Kurdish–Turkish conflict (2015-present)
- Location: Umutlu village, Gercüş, Batman Province, Turkey
- Date: 4 October 2018; 06:00 (EEST)
- Target: Turkish soldiers
- Deaths: 8
- Injuries: 1
- Perpetrator: Kurdistan Workers' Party

The 2018 Gercüş bombing happened in Gercüş, Batman Province in Umutlu village on 4 October 2018 around 6:00 (EEST) when Kurdistan Workers' Party militants detonated a remote-controlled bomb when an armoured personnel carrier carrying soldiers to Dargeçit, Mardin Province. 8 soldiers died and 1 other was heavily injured as a result.

== Background ==
The conflict between Turkey and the Kurdistan Workers' Party (PKK) (designated a terrorist organisation by Turkey, the United States, the European Union and NATO) has been active since 1984, primarily in the southeast of the country. More than 40,000 people have died as a result of the conflict.

== Bombing ==
On 4 October 2018, around 6:00, a remote-controlled bomb hidden below the asphalt placed by PKK members on a road in Umutlu village of Gercüş was detonated when an armoured personnel carrier carrying soldiers to Yemişli village of Dargeçit, forming a 1,5 meters deep and 4,5 meters wide pit while killing 4 soldiers and injuring 5 others. All 5 injured soldiers were rushed to the Batman State Hospital, where 3 of them died the same day. Around 16:00, one of the heavily injured soldiers, senior master sergeant Yahya Şen was transferred to a hospital in Gülhane Education and Research Hospital in Ankara but he died on the way to Ankara, increasing the death toll to 8. The other soldier, Muhammet Salih Akyüz was heavily injured but he survived. 7 of the killed soldiers were senior master sergeants while the other one was a non-commissioned officer. It was later determined that the bomb was planted in the road several days ago, but it went unnoticed. An air-supported military operation was launched in region after the attack to capture perpetrators.
