= Taşçı =

Taşçı (Turkish pronunciation: [taʃtʃɯ]) is a Turkish word meaning "stonemason." It may refer to:

== People ==
- Serdar Tasci, German footballer
- Tuğba Taşçı, Turkish female basketball player
- Vecihe Taşçı (1905–2002), Turkish female rower and tennis player

Tashchy

- Borys Tashchy, Ukrainian footballer.

== Places ==
- Taşçı, Develi, a village in Kayseri Province, Turkey
- Taşçı, Gercüş, a village in Batman Province, Turkey
