= Ardıç =

Ardıç can refer to:

- Ardıç, Gercüş
- Ardıç, Osmancık
