= Dereiçi =

Dereiçi (Turkish: "in the creek") may refer to the following places in Turkey:

- Dereiçi, Gercüş, a village in the district of Gercüş, Batman Province
- Dereiçi, Hopa, a village in the district of Hopa, Artvin Province
- Dereiçi, Sason, a village in the district of Sason, Batman Province
- Dereiçi, Savur, a village in the district of Savur, Mardin Province
- Dereiçi, Şavşat, a village in the district of Şavşat, Artvin Province
- Dereiçi, Yusufeli, a village in the district of Yusufeli, Artvin Province
