= Yemişli =

Yemişli may refer to the following places in Turkey:

- Yemişli, Gercüş, a village in the district of Gercüş, Batman Province
- Yemişli, Karataş, a village in the district of Karataş, Adana Province
- Yemişli, Midyat, a village in the district of Midyat, Mardin Province
- Yemişli, Uludere, a village in the district of Uludere, Şırnak Province
