= Geçit =

Geçit can refer to:

- Geçit, Erzincan
- Geçit, Gercüş
