= Arıca =

Arıca may refer to:

== People ==
- Erdoğan Arıca, Turkish football manager
- Soner Arıca, Turkish singer

== Places ==
- Arıca, Gercüş, a village in the district of Gercüş, Batman Province, Turkey
- Arıca, Vezirköprü, a village in the district of Vezirköprü, Samsun Province, Turkey

== See also ==
- Arica (disambiguation)
