= Polycarpus Augin Aydin =

Syriac Orthodox Ecclesiastical authority

His Eminence Mor Polycarpus Augin Aydın ܦܘܠܝܩܪܦܘܣ ܐܘܓܝܢ ܐܝܕܝܢ
- Metropolitan and Patriarchal Vicar for the Archdiocese of the Netherlands
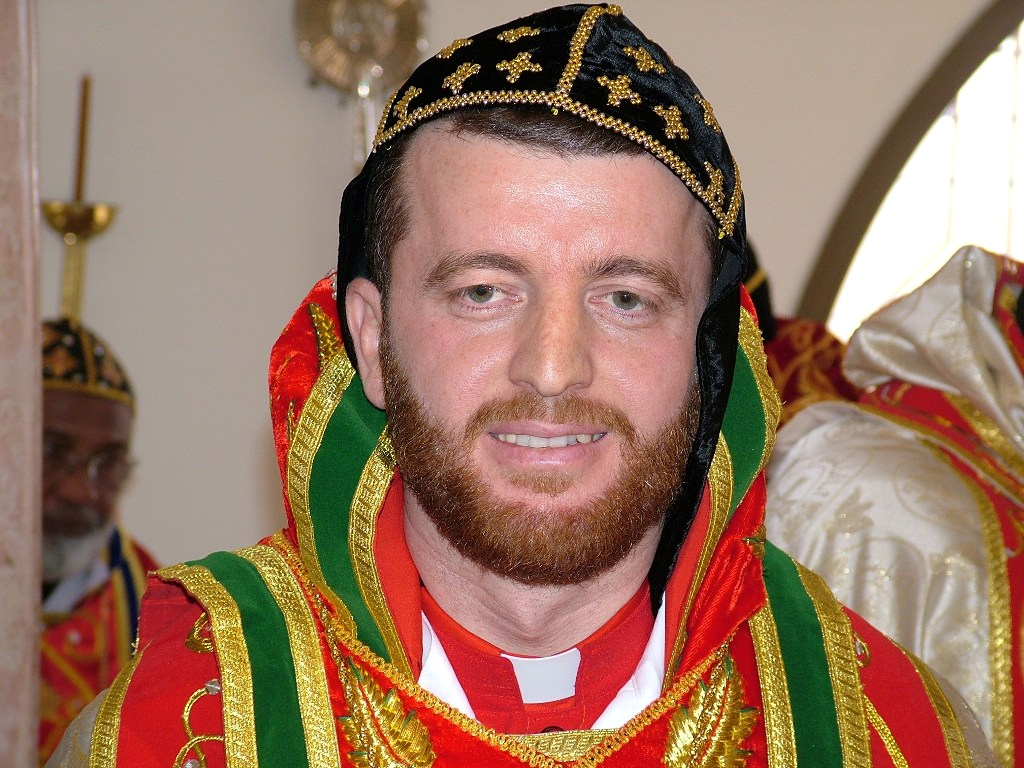
- Church: Syriac Orthodox Church
- See: the Netherlands
- In office: 2007–present
- Predecessor: Julius Yeshu Çiçek

Orders
- Ordination: August 4, 2002 by Mor Timotheos Samuel Aktaş
- Consecration: April 15, 2007 by Ignatius Zakka I Iwas
- Rank: Metropolitan (archbishop)

Personal details
- Born: June 10, 1971 (age 54) Qritho di 'Ito, Turkey

Polycarpus Augin Aydın (Syriac: ܡܪܝ ܦܘܠܝܩܪܦܘܣ ܐܘܓܝܢ ܐܝܕܝܢ; born Edip Aydın (Syriac: ܐܕܝܒ ܐܝܕܝܢ); on June 10, 1971 near Nusaybin (Nisibis), Turkey), is the Metropolitan and Patriarchal Vicar for the Archdiocese of the Netherlands of the Syriac Orthodox Church. The Metropolitan Seat is located at St. Ephrem the Syrian Monastery in Glane/Losser, the Netherlands.

== Early life and education ==
Edip Aydın, firstborn son of Shem'un and Nisani Aydın, was born in the village of Gündükşükrü also known as Qritho di 'Ito (Syriac: ܓܘܢܕܘܟ ܫܘܟܪܐ), in the vicinity of Nusaybin (Nisibis), the town of St. Ephrem the Syrian, in the region of Tur 'Abdin, southeastern Anatolia, Turkey, on June 10, 1971.

In 1982, after completing his elementary education in the village, Aydın entered the Seminary of Mor Gabriel Monastery, located near Midyat, Turkey, where he received training in both Syriac language and literature as well as in traditional Syriac theology and liturgy.

Following his secondary education in Turkey, Aydın earned a degree of Bachelor of Divinity in 1995 at Heythrop College, University of London, United Kingdom. Next, he spent a year at the Oriental Institute of the University of Oxford, United Kingdom as a Visiting Student, following a Master of Syriac Studies (M.St.) under the supervision of Dr. Sebastian Brock.

In May 2000 he was awarded the degree of Master of Divinity at Saint Vladimir's Orthodox Theological Seminary, Crestwood, New York, United States. The title of his thesis is: The History of the Syriac Orthodox Church of Antioch in North America: Challenges and Opportunities.

On May 21, 2011, Aydın was awarded the degree of Doctor of Philosophy at Princeton Theological Seminary, Princeton, New Jersey, United States, in the field of Early Church History and Ecumenics under the supervision of Professor Kathleen McVey. The title of his dissertation is: Comparing the Syriac Order of Monastic Profession (Syriac: ܛܟܣܐ ܕܣܘܦܪܐ) with the Order of Baptism (Syriac: ܛܟܣܐ ܕܥܡܕܐ) both in External Structure and in Theological Themes.

== Pastoral life ==
On October 7, 2001, Edip Aydın was tonsured as a monk (Syriac: ܕܝܪܝܐ) by Mor Ignatius Zakka I Iwas, Patriarch of Antioch and All the East at St. Ephrem's Monastery in Damascus, Syria and given the name Augin (Eugene), sometimes spelled Awgin, in honor of Mor Augin of Tur Izlo. On August 4, 2002 he was ordained to the priesthood at Mor Gabriel Monastery by Mor Timotheos Samuel Aktaş, the Archbishop of Tur 'Abdin.

On April 15, 2007, Mor Ignatius Zakka I Iwas, the Patriarch of Antioch and All the East consecrated Augin Aydın a Metropolitan by the name Polycarpus in honor of St. Polycarp of Smyrna at the Cathedral of St. Peter & St. Paul in Ma'arrat Saydnaya, (Arabic: معرة صيدنايا) near Damascus, Syria. He was then appointed the Metropolitan and Patriarchal Vicar for the Archdiocese of the Netherlands of the Syriac Orthodox Church, succeeding the late Mor Julius Yeshu Çiçek.

== See also ==
- Syriac Orthodox Church
