= Kantar, Gercüş =

Village in Batman Province, Turkey

Kantar
- Village
- Location within Turkey
- Coordinates: 37.739°N 41.136°E
- Country: Turkey
- Province: Batman
- District: Gercüş
- Population (2021): 147
- Time zone: UTC+3 (TRT)

Kantar (Kurdish: Qantarê) is a village in the Gercüş District of Batman Province in Turkey. It had a population of 147 in 2021. The village is populated by Kurds of the Habezbenî tribe.

The village is 110 km from Batman and 50 km from Gercüş.
