= Kışlak, Gercüş =

Village in Batman Province, Turkey

Kışlak
- Village
- Location within Turkey
- Coordinates: 37.651°N 41.127°E
- Country: Turkey
- Province: Batman
- District: Gercüş
- Population (2021): 23
- Time zone: UTC+3 (TRT)

Kışlak (Kurdish: Zivinge) is a village in the Gercüş District of Batman Province in Turkey. The village is populated by Kurds of the Habezbenî tribe and had a population of 23 in 2021.
