= Yamanlar, Gercüş =

Village in Batman Province, Turkey

Yamanlar
- Village
- Location within Turkey
- Coordinates: 37.547°N 41.461°E
- Country: Turkey
- Province: Batman
- District: Gercüş
- Population (2021): 224
- Time zone: UTC+3 (TRT)

Yamanlar (Kurdish: Erdê; (Note: Also spelt as Erde, Erdi, or İrdi.) Syriac: Yardo, lit. 'spring') (Note: Alternatively transliterated as Yard, Yared, or Yerd. Nisba: Ärdōyo.) is a village in the Gercüş District of Batman Province in Turkey. The village is populated by Syriacs and Kurds of the Arnas tribe and had a population of 224 in 2021. It is located in the historic region of Tur Abdin.

In the village, there is a church of Mor Aho.

== History ==
Yardo (today called Yamanlar) was historically inhabited by Syriac Orthodox Christians. In the Syriac Orthodox patriarchal register of dues of 1870, it was recorded that the village had 12 households, who paid 38 dues, and did not have a church or a priest. In 1914, it was inhabited by 250 Syriacs, according to the list presented to the Paris Peace Conference by the Assyro-Chaldean delegation. It was located in the kaza of Midyat. There were 70 Syriac families and 30 Kurdish families in 1915.

Amidst the Sayfo, the local Kurdish chiefs Osman Tammero and Sleyman Shamdin conspired to deceive the Syriacs at Yardo with a mutual agreement to not harm each other and subsequently one day they lured some of them out of the village under the guise of tackling cattle thieves. However, after they had reached some distance from the village, the Syriac village headman, Malke Khatun, saw the Kurds enter Yardo and realised their intention to ambush the Syriacs upon their return and thus they took refuge at a nearby ruined fortress and demanded the release of the Syriac villagers who the Kurds had taken captive. The villagers were released and joined the others at the ruined fortress, but the Syriacs were then attacked by the Kurds as they all proceeded to ‘Ayn-Wardo and only forty women and children survived who were taken captive to be kept as slaves in Muslim households.

The population was 507 in 1960. There were 110 Kurdish-speaking Christians in thirty families in 1960. Syriacs from Yardo emigrated to Germany and other European countries in the late 20th century. In 2013, there were two Syriacs at Yardo in one family.

== Demography ==
The following is a list of the number of Syriac families that have inhabited Yardo per year stated. Unless otherwise stated, all figures are from the list provided in The Syrian Orthodox Christians in the Late Ottoman Period and Beyond: Crisis then Revival, as noted in the bibliography below.

- 1915: 30
- 1966: 30
- 1978: 33
- 1979: 31
- 1981: 27
- 1987: 16
- 1999: 1
- 2013: 1

== Bibliography ==
- Barsoum, Aphrem (2008). The History of Tur Abdin. Translated by Matti Moosa. Gorgias Press.
- Bcheiry, Iskandar (2009). The Syriac Orthodox Patriarchal Register of Dues of 1870: An Unpublished Historical Document from the Late Ottoman Period. Gorgias Press.
- Biner, Zerrin Özlem (2020). States of Dispossession: Violence and Precarious Coexistence in Southeast Turkey. University of Pennsylvania Press.
- Courtois, Sébastien de (2004). The Forgotten Genocide: Eastern Christians, The Last Arameans. Translated by Vincent Aurora. Gorgias Press.
- Courtois, Sébastien de (2013). "Tur Abdin : Réflexions sur l'état présent descommunautés syriaques du Sud-Est de la Turquie, mémoire, exils, retours". Cahier du Gremmamo (in French). 21: 113–150.
- Dinno, Khalid S. (2017). The Syrian Orthodox Christians in the Late Ottoman Period and Beyond: Crisis then Revival. Gorgias Press.
- Gaunt, David (2006). Massacres, Resistance, Protectors: Muslim-Christian Relations in Eastern Anatolia during World War I. Gorgias Press.
- Hollerweger, Hans; Palmer, Andrew (1999). Turabdin: Living Cultural Heritage (in English, German, and Turkish) (2nd ed.). Friends of Tur Abdin.
- Jongerden, Joost; Verheij, Jelle, eds. (2012). Social Relations in Ottoman Diyarbekir, 1870-1915. Brill.
- Ritter, Hellmut (1967). Turoyo: Die Volkssprache der Syrischen Christen des Tur 'Abdin (in German). Vol. 1. Franz Steiner Verlag.
- Tan, Altan (2018). Turabidin'den Berriye'ye. Aşiretler - Dinler - Diller - Kültürler (in Turkish). ISBN 9789944360944.
