= Gönüllü, Gercüş =

Village in Batman Province, Turkey

Gönüllü
- Village
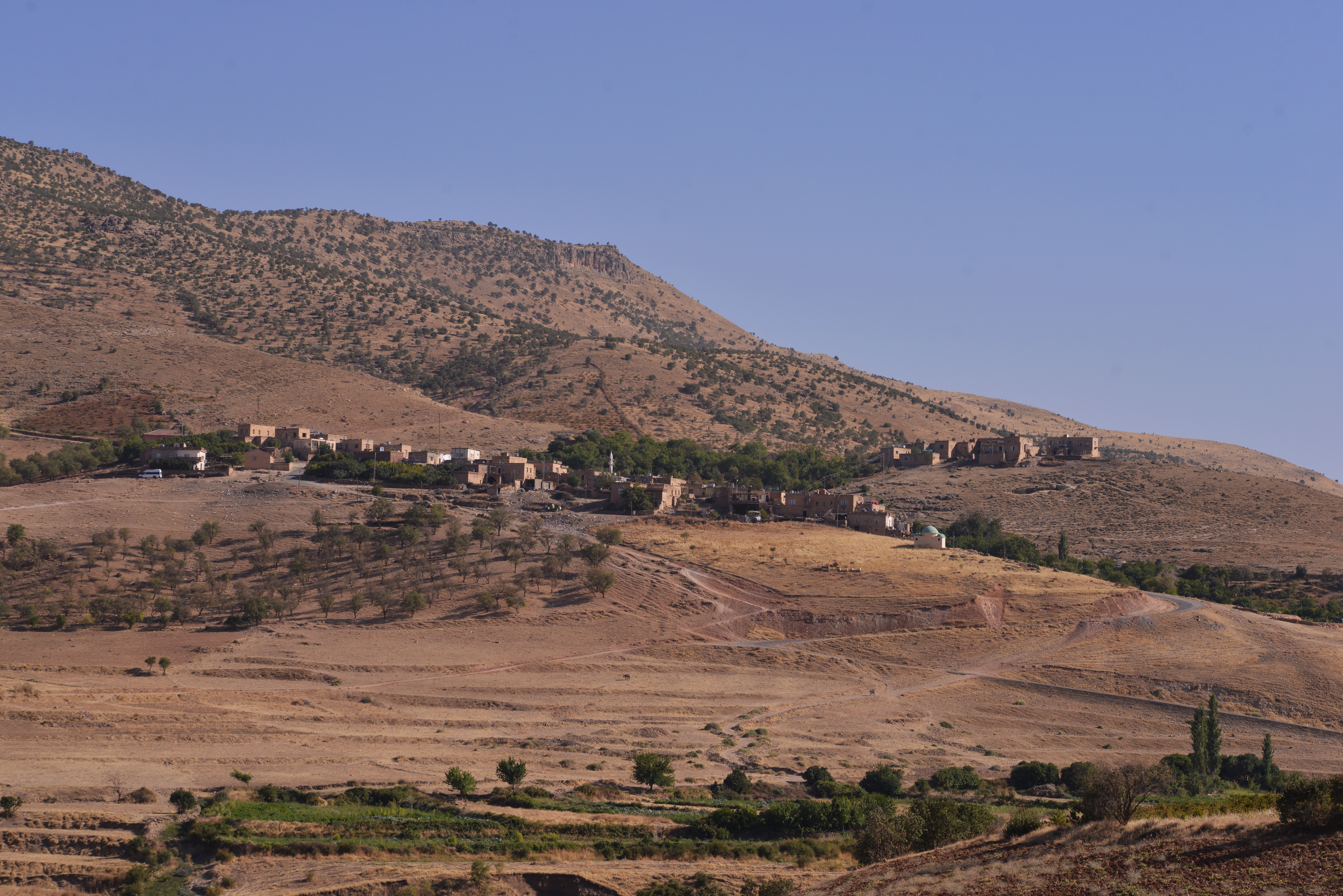

- Location within Turkey
- Coordinates: 37.645°N 41.491°E
- Country: Turkey
- Province: Batman
- District: Gercüş
- Population (2021): 357
- Time zone: UTC+3 (TRT)

Gönüllü (Kurdish: Derdile; Syriac: Dayro d-Il, lit. 'Dwelling of God') (Note: Also spelt as Deir Da‘il, Derdil, Dēr Dil.) is a village in the Gercüş District of Batman Province in Turkey. The village had a population of 357 in 2021.

Rice is grown at the village. In the village, there is the ruined Monastery of Mor Shemʿun.

== History ==
The monastery at Dayro d-Il (today called Gönüllü) was built between 700 and 734 AD.

It had a population of 201 in 1935.

== Bibliography ==
- Bell, Gertrude (1982). The Churches and Monasteries of the Ṭur ʻAbdin. Pindar Press.
- Keser-Kayaalp, Elif, ed. (January 2022). Syriac Architectural Heritage at Risk in TurʿAbdin (PDF).
- Tan, Altan (2018). Turabidin'den Berriye'ye. Aşiretler - Dinler - Diller - Kültürler (in Turkish). Pak Ajans Yayincilik Turizm Ve Diş Ticaret Limited şirketi. ISBN 9789944360944.
- Wießner, Gernot (1993). Christliche Kultbauten im Ṭūr ʻAbdīn (in German). Vol. IV. Harrassowitz Verlag.
