= Gercüş District =

District of Batman Province, Turkey

- District
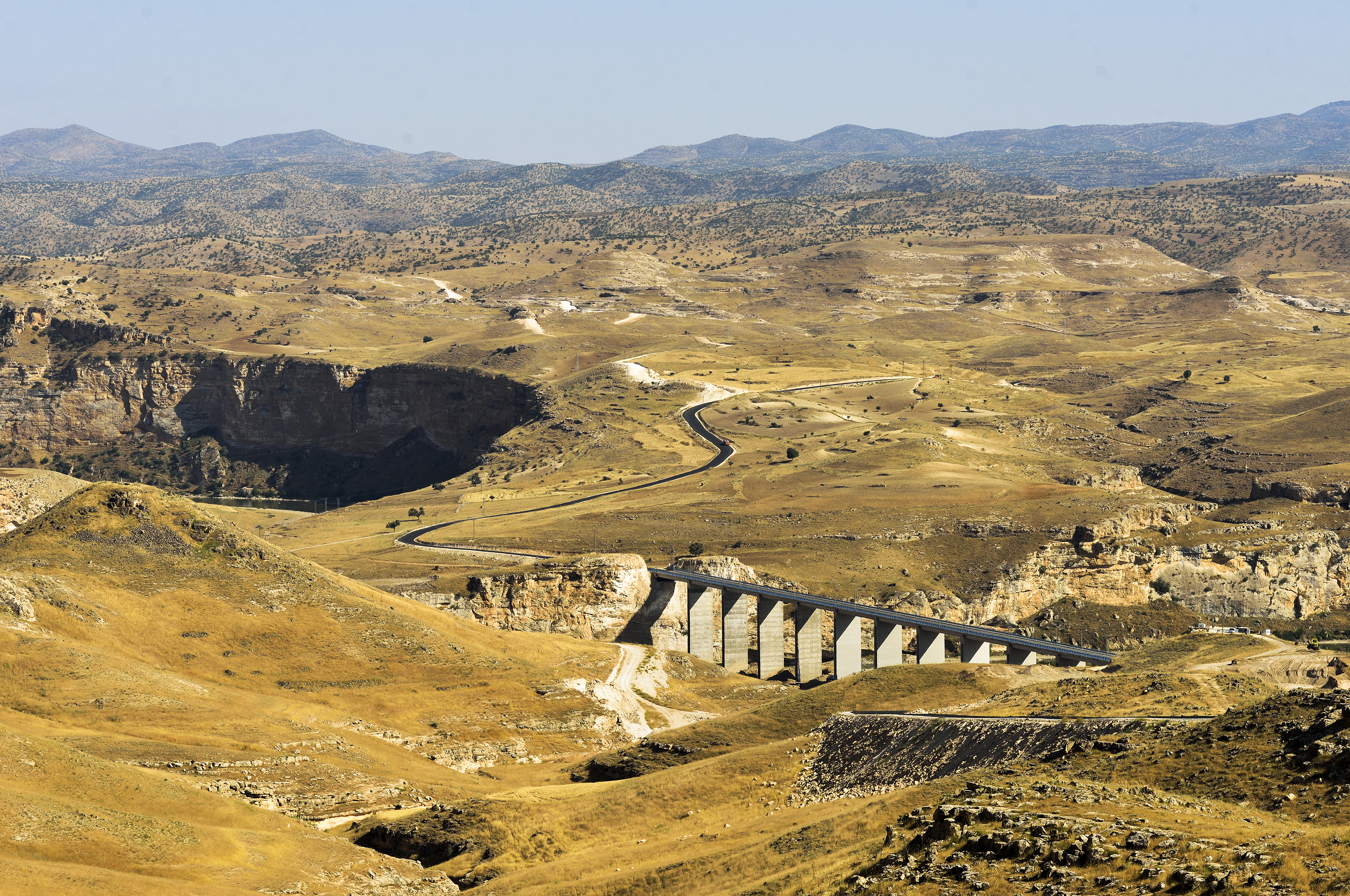
- near Kantar, Gercüş

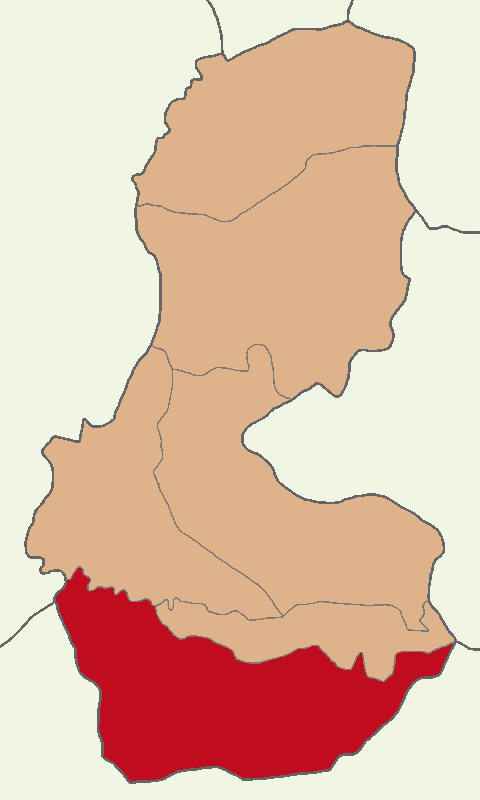
- Map showing Gercüş District in Batman Province

- Location within Turkey
- Coordinates: 37°34′N 41°23′E
- Country: Turkey
- Province: Batman
- Seat: Gercüş

Government
  - Kaymakam: Muhammed Öztaş
- Area: 914 km^{2} (353 sq mi)
- Population (2021): 19,304
  - Density: 21.1/km^{2} (54.7/sq mi)
- Time zone: UTC+3 (TRT)
- Website: www.gercus.gov.tr

Gercüş District is a district of Batman Province in Turkey. The town of Gercüş is the seat and the district had a population of 19,304 in 2021. Its area is 914 km^{2}. The district was established in 1926.

== Composition ==
There are two municipalities in Gercüş District:

- Gercüş
- Kayapınar

There are 58 villages in Gercüş District:

- Akburç
- Akyar
- Ardıç
- Ardıçlı
- Arıca
- Aydınca
- Aydınlı
- Babnir
- Bağlıca
- Bağözü
- Başarköy
- Başova
- Becirman
- Boğazköy
- Çalışkan
- Cevizli
- Çiçekli
- Çukuryurt
- Dereiçi
- Dereli
- Doruk
- Düzmeşe
- Eymir
- Geçitköy
- Gökçe
- Gökçepınar
- Gönüllü
- Gürbüz
- Güzelöz
- Hisar
- Kantar
- Karalan
- Kayalar
- Kesiksu
- Kırkat
- Kışlak
- Koçak
- Kömürcü
- Koyunlu
- Kozlu
- Kutlu
- Nurlu
- Özler
- Poyraz
- Rüzgarlı
- Sargın
- Seki
- Serinköy
- Taşçı
- Tepecik
- Ulaş
- Yakıtlı
- Yamanlar
- Yassıca
- Yayladüzü
- Yemişli
- Yenice
- Yüceköy

The district encompasses 12 hamlets.
