= Yüceköy, Gercüş =

Village in Batman Province, Turkey

Yüceköy
- Village
- Location within Turkey
- Coordinates: 37.604°N 41.339°E
- Country: Turkey
- Province: Batman
- District: Gercüş
- Population (2021): 259
- Time zone: UTC+3 (TRT)

Yüceköy (Kurdish: Balanê) is a village in the Gercüş District of Batman Province in Turkey. The village is populated by Kurds of non-tribal affiliation and had a population of 259 in 2021.
