= Kırkat, Gercüş =

Village in Batman Province, Turkey

Kırkat
- Village
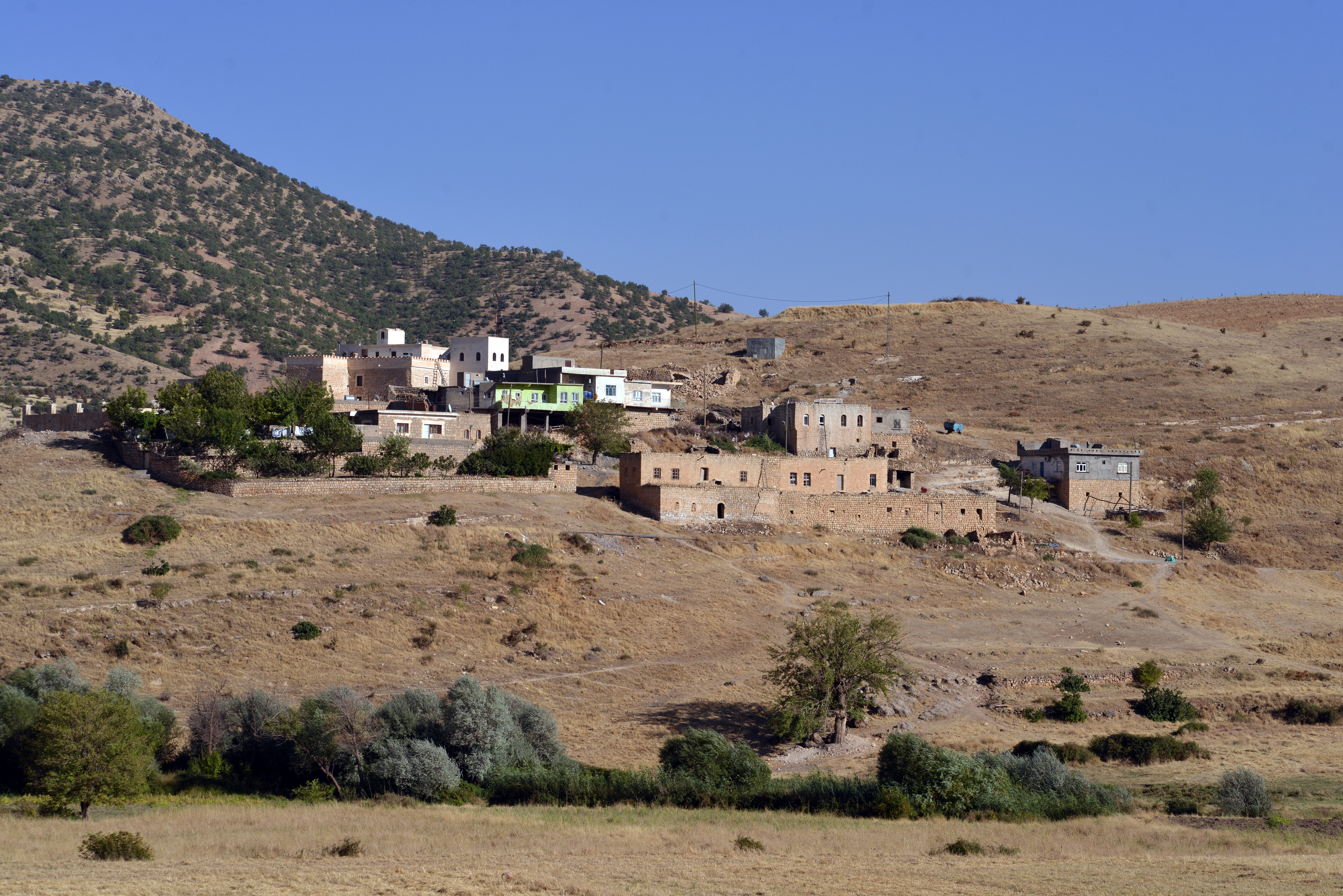
- Öteyaka hamlet

- Location within Turkey
- Coordinates: 37.560°N 41.297°E
- Country: Turkey
- Province: Batman
- District: Gercüş
- Population (2021): 540
- Time zone: UTC+3 (TRT)

Kırkat (Kurdish: Kirkat) is a village in the Gercüş District of Batman Province in Turkey. The village is populated by Kurds of the Kercoz tribe and had a population of 540 in 2021.

The hamlets of Konak and Öteyaka are attached to the village.
