= Kömürcü, Gercüş =

Village in Batman Province, Turkey

Kömürcü
- Village
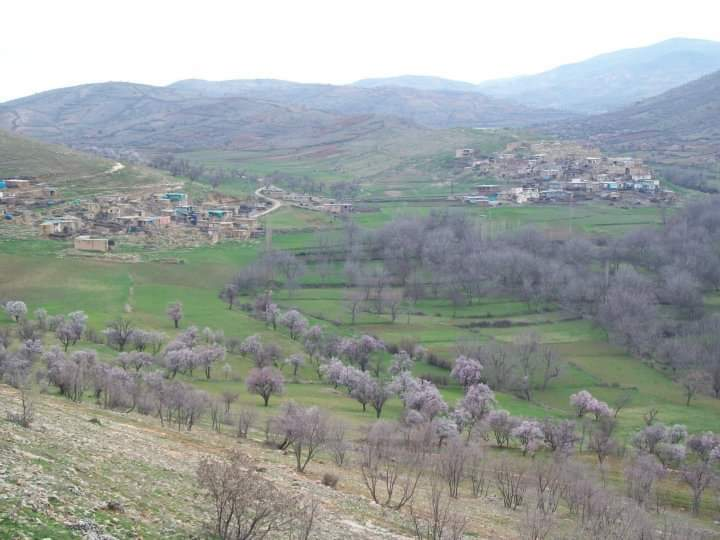

- Location within Turkey
- Coordinates: 37.642°N 41.206°E
- Country: Turkey
- Province: Batman
- District: Gercüş
- Population (2021): 291
- Time zone: UTC+3 (TRT)

Kömürcü (Kurdish: Silêbînê) is a village in the Gercüş District of Batman Province in Turkey. The village is populated by Kurds of the Hesar tribe and had a population of 291 in 2021.
