= Cigerxwîn =

Kurdish writer and poet (1903–1984)

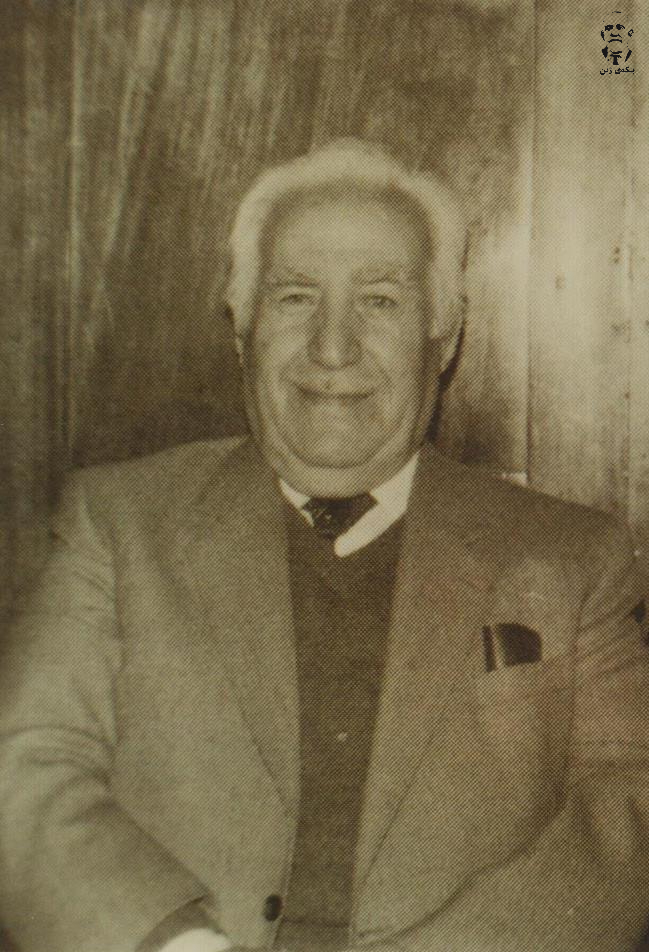
- Cigerxwîn in 1975
- Born: 1903; Hesar, Batman, Ottoman Empire
- Died: October 22, 1984 (aged 80–81); Stockholm, Sweden
- Occupations: Poet, writer, journalist, historian, lexicographer
- Writing career
- Period: 1945–1984
- Subjects: Kurdish literature and culture
- Literary movement: Kurdish nationalism, Romanticism, Marxism

Cigerxwîn or Cegerxwîn (Northern Kurdish: [d͡ʒɪɡɛɾxwiːn], Kurdish: Cegerxwîn, Sorani Kurdish: جگەرخوێن; 1903 – 22 October 1984) was a Kurdish poet, writer, journalist, historian, and lexicographer. He is regarded as one of the most influential figures in Kurdish literature. Many of his poems were later adapted into songs, and his work played an important role in the preservation and development of Kurdish culture and literary heritage.

== Biography ==
Cigerxwîn's real name was Şêxmûs Hesen. His pen name, Cigerxwîn, means "Bleeding Liver" in Kurdish.

He was born in the Kurdish village of Hesar, near Batman, in the Ottoman Empire. Although the year of his birth is known, no documentation exists regarding the exact day or month. In 1914, at the beginning of World War I, his family became refugees and fled to Amuda, near Qamishli in present-day northeastern Syria.

Cigerxwîn studied theology and became a cleric in 1921. Together with several compatriots, he established a Kurdish association in Amuda. In 1946, he moved to Qamishli and became involved in politics. That same year, he became secretary of Civata Azadî û Yekîtiya Kurd ("Kurdish Freedom and Union Front"). In 1948, he joined the Syrian Communist Party and became the party's candidate for the Syrian Parliament in 1954. He left the Communist Party in 1957 and founded the Azadî ("Freedom") organization, which was later merged with the Kurdish Democratic Party of Syria.

Cigerxwîn was arrested and imprisoned in Damascus in 1963 and was later exiled to Suwayda. In 1969, he moved to Iraqi Kurdistan, where he became involved in the Kurdish uprising led by Mustafa Barzani. In 1973, he relocated to Lebanon, where he published his widely known poetry collection Kîme Ez? ("Who Am I?"). In 1976, he returned to Syria, but three years later, at the age of 75 or 76, he fled to Sweden, where he published several additional collections of poetry.

Cigerxwîn died in Stockholm in 1984 at the age of 80 or 81. His body was returned to Kurdistan and buried at his home in Qamishli.

== Works ==
Cigerxwîn began writing poetry in 1924. Following the collapse of the Sheikh Said rebellion, he joined the Xoybûn organization, which had been established by exiled Kurdish intellectuals in Syria. During this period, he also began writing works on Kurdish history.

After the Sheikh Said rebellion, he started publishing his poems in the Kurdish journal Hawar. His poetry combined elements of modern Romanticism and literary realism while preserving the classical style of traditional Kurdish poetry. In his works, he sharply criticized the feudal and religious establishments, which he viewed as the primary causes of the poor living conditions endured by Kurdish workers and peasants. He also argued that these conservative forces represented a major obstacle to Kurdish freedom and independence.

In 1961, he helped establish a Kurdish language department focused on Northern Kurdish (Kurmanji) at the University of Baghdad. During the same period, he worked in the Kurdish section of Radio Baghdad.

Cigerxwîn wrote primarily in the Kurmanji dialect, and his poetry had a profound influence on Kurdish society and culture throughout Kurdistan. Because of this influence, the era in which he wrote is often referred to as the "Cigerxwîn period" in Kurdish poetry. He preserved and promoted the literary heritage of classical Kurdish poets such as Melayê Cizîrî and Ehmedê Xanî. His poetry is noted for its simple, revolutionary language and strong popular appeal, often prioritizing message and accessibility over aesthetic complexity.

He published eight poetry collections, a book on the history of Kurdistan, a Kurdish dictionary, and a work on Kurdish folklore.

== Published works ==
=== Poetry collections ===
1. Dîwana Yekem: Prîsk û Pêtî ("First Collection of Poems"), Damascus, 1945.
2. Dîwana Duwem: Sewra Azadî ("Second Collection of Poems"), Damascus, 1954.
3. Dîwana Sêyem: Kîme Ez? ("Third Collection of Poems"), Beirut, 1973.
4. Dîwana Çarem: Ronak ("Fourth Collection of Poems"), Roja Nû Publishers, Stockholm, 1980.
5. Dîwana Pêncem: Zend-Avesta ("Fifth Collection of Poems"), Roja Nû Publishers, Stockholm, 1981.
6. Dîwana Şeşem: Şefeq ("Sixth Collection of Poems"), Roja Nû Publishers, Stockholm, 1982.
7. Dîwana Heftem: Hêvî ("Seventh Collection of Poems"), Roja Nû Publishers, Stockholm, 1983.
8. Dîwana Heştem: Aştî ("Eighth Collection of Poems"), Kurdistan Publishers, Stockholm, 1985.

=== Language and culture ===
1. Destûra Zimanê Kurdî ("Grammar of the Kurdish Language"), Baghdad, 1961.
2. Ferheng, Perçê Yekem ("Kurdish Dictionary, Part One"), Baghdad, 1962.
3. Ferheng, Perçê Duwem ("Kurdish Dictionary, Part Two"), Baghdad, 1962.

=== History ===
1. Tarîxa Kurdistan ("History of Kurdistan"), 3 volumes, Stockholm, 1985–1987.

== See also ==
- List of Kurdish scholars
- Hemin Mukriyani
