= Çalışkan, Gercüş =

Village in Batman Province, Turkey

Çalışkan
- Village
- Location within Turkey
- Coordinates: 37.656°N 41.627°E
- Country: Turkey
- Province: Batman
- District: Gercüş
- Population (2021): 27
- Time zone: UTC+3 (TRT)

Çalışkan (Kurdish: Heştuvan) is a village in the Gercüş District of Batman Province in Turkey. The village is populated by Kurds of the Basiqil tribe and had a population of 27 in 2021.
