= Azamora bilinealis =

Scientific classification
- Domain: Eukaryota
- Kingdom: Animalia
- Phylum: Arthropoda
- Class: Insecta
- Order: Lepidoptera
- Family: Pyralidae
- Genus: Azamora
- Species: A. bilinealis

Binomial name
- Azamora bilinealis (Amsel, 1956)

Synonyms
- Thylacophora (Azamora) bilinealis Amsel, 1956

Species of moth

Azamora bilinealis is a species of snout moth in the genus Azamora. It was described by Hans Georg Amsel in 1956, and is known from Venezuela.
