= Düzmeşe, Gercüş =

Village in Batman Province, Turkey

Düzmeşe
- Village
- Location within Turkey
- Coordinates: 37.604°N 41.439°E
- Country: Turkey
- Province: Batman
- District: Gercüş
- Population (2021): 56
- Time zone: UTC+3 (TRT)

Düzmeşe (Kurdish: Havrê) is a village in the Gercüş District of Batman Province in Turkey. The village is populated by Kurds of the Kercoz tribe and had a population of 56 in 2021.
