= Aydınlı, Gercüş =

Village in Batman Province, Turkey

Aydınlı
- Village
- Location within Turkey
- Coordinates: 37.651°N 41.286°E
- Country: Turkey
- Province: Batman
- District: Gercüş
- Population (2021): 189
- Time zone: UTC+3 (TRT)

Aydınlı (Kurdish: Qamarînê) is a village in the Gercüş District of Batman Province in Turkey. The village is populated by Kurds of the Hesar tribe and had a population of 189 in 2021.

The hamlet of Mağarali is attached to the village.
