= Çiçekli, Gercüş =

Village in Batman Province, Turkey

Çiçekli
- Village
- Location within Turkey
- Coordinates: 37.670°N 41.501°E
- Country: Turkey
- Province: Batman
- District: Gercüş
- Population (2021): 135
- Time zone: UTC+3 (TRT)

Çiçekli (Kurdish: Şiferê) is a village in the Gercüş District of Batman Province in Turkey. It is populated by Kurds of the Derhawî tribe and had a population of 135 in 2021.
