= Koçak, Gercüş =

Village in Batman Province, Turkey

Koçak
- Village
- Location within Turkey
- Coordinates: 37.572°N 41.516°E
- Country: Turkey
- Province: Batman
- District: Gercüş
- Population (2021): 444
- Time zone: UTC+3 (TRT)

Koçak (Kurdish: Kerkinnê; (Note: Also spelt as Kerkenne.) Syriac: Karḫnū) is a village in the Gercüş District of Batman Province in Turkey. The village is populated by Kurds of the Dermemikan tribe and had a population of 444 in 2021. It is located in the historic region of Tur Abdin.

== History ==
Karḫnū (today called Koçak) was historically inhabited by Syriac Orthodox Christians. In the Syriac Orthodox patriarchal register of dues of 1870, it was recorded that the village had 3 households, who did not pay any dues, and did not have a church or a priest.

== Bibliography ==
- Bcheiry, Iskandar (2009). The Syriac Orthodox Patriarchal Register of Dues of 1870: An Unpublished Historical Document from the Late Ottoman Period. Gorgias Press.
- Dinno, Khalid S. (2017). The Syrian Orthodox Christians in the Late Ottoman Period and Beyond: Crisis then Revival. Gorgias Press.
- Tan, Altan (2018). Turabidin'den Berriye'ye. Aşiretler - Dinler - Diller - Kültürler (in Turkish). ISBN 9789944360944.
