= Kayapınar, Gercüş =

Town in Batman Province, Turkey

Kayapınar
- Municipality
- Location in Turkey
- Coordinates: 37.557°N 41.166°E
- Country: Turkey
- Province: Batman
- District: Gercüş
- Population (2021): 2,303
- Time zone: UTC+3 (TRT)

Kayapınar, also known as Aynkaf, is a municipality (belde) in the Gercüş District of Batman Province in Turkey. The village is populated by Arabs and by Kurds of the Kercoz tribe. It had a population of 2,303 in 2021.
