= Özler, Gercüş =

Village in Batman Province, Turkey

Özler
- Village
- Location within Turkey
- Coordinates: 37.575°N 41.448°E
- Country: Turkey
- Province: Batman
- District: Gercüş
- Population (2021): 82
- Time zone: UTC+3 (TRT)

Özler (Kurdish: Îlozê; Syriac: ʿĪlūs) (Note: Alternatively transliterated as ‘Iloz or ‘İlōze.) is a village in the Gercüş District of Batman Province in Turkey. The village is populated by Kurds of the Kercoz tribe and had a population of 82 in 2021. It is located in the historic region of Tur Abdin.

== History ==
ʿĪlūs (today called Özler) was historically inhabited by Syriac Orthodox Christians. In the Syriac Orthodox patriarchal register of dues of 1870, it was recorded that the village had 9 households, who paid 16 dues, and did not have a church or a priest.

== Bibliography ==
- Bcheiry, Iskandar (2009). The Syriac Orthodox Patriarchal Register of Dues of 1870: An Unpublished Historical Document from the Late Ottoman Period. Gorgias Press.
- Dinno, Khalid S. (2017). The Syrian Orthodox Christians in the Late Ottoman Period and Beyond: Crisis then Revival. Gorgias Press.
- Tan, Altan (2018). Turabidin'den Berriye'ye. Aşiretler - Dinler - Diller - Kültürler (in Turkish). ISBN 9789944360944.
- Wießner, Gernot (1993). Christliche Kultbauten im Ṭūr ʻAbdīn (in German). Vol. IV. Harrassowitz Verlag.
