= Rüzgarlı, Gercüş =

Village in Batman Province, Turkey

Rüzgarlı
- Village
- Location within Turkey
- Coordinates: 37.657°N 41.327°E
- Country: Turkey
- Province: Batman
- District: Gercüş
- Population (2021): 168
- Time zone: UTC+3 (TRT)

Rüzgarlı (Kurdish: Baglatê) is a village in the Gercüş District of Batman Province in Turkey. The village is populated by Kurds of the Reman tribe and had a population of 168 in 2021.
