= Seki, Gercüş =

Village in Batman Province, Turkey

Seki
- Village
- Location within Turkey
- Coordinates: 37.622°N 41.509°E
- Country: Turkey
- Province: Batman
- District: Gercüş
- Population (2021): 341
- Time zone: UTC+3 (TRT)

Seki (Kurdish: Xerabê Bena; Syriac: Ḫarābā Bannā) (Note: Alternatively transliterated as Harabebanna, Harabenna, Harabenna Harabesi, or Kharaba Banna.) is a village in the Gercüş District of Batman Province in Turkey. The village is populated by Kurds of the Bêcirmanî tribe and had a population of 341 in 2021. It is located in the historic region of Tur Abdin.

== History ==
Ḫarābā Bannā (today called Seki) was historically inhabited by Syriac Orthodox Christians. In the Syriac Orthodox patriarchal register of dues of 1870, it was recorded that the village had 10 households, who paid 27 dues, and did not have a church or a priest.

== Bibliography ==
- Barsoum, Aphrem (2008). The History of Tur Abdin. Translated by Matti Moosa. Gorgias Press.
- Bcheiry, Iskandar (2009). The Syriac Orthodox Patriarchal Register of Dues of 1870: An Unpublished Historical Document from the Late Ottoman Period. Gorgias Press.
- Dinno, Khalid S. (2017). The Syrian Orthodox Christians in the Late Ottoman Period and Beyond: Crisis then Revival. Gorgias Press.
- Keskin, Necat (2014). Akışkan Kimlikler: Etnik ve Dini Kimlik Arasında Becirman Seyyidleri (Thesis) (in Turkish). Ankara.
- Wießner, Gernot (1993). Christliche Kultbauten im Ṭūr ʻAbdīn (in German). Vol. IV. Harrassowitz Verlag.
