= Cevizli, Gercüş =

Village in Batman Province, Turkey

Cevizli
- Village
- Location within Turkey
- Coordinates: 37.618°N 41.681°E
- Country: Turkey
- Province: Batman
- District: Gercüş
- Population (2021): 11
- Time zone: UTC+3 (TRT)

Cevizli (Kurdish: Posinça) is a village in the Gercüş District of Batman Province in Turkey. The village is populated by Kurds of the Basiqil tribe and had a population of 11 in 2021.

The village was repopulated after 2007. It's was unpopulated until 2016.
