= Hisar, Gercüş =

Village in Batman Province, Turkey

Hisar
- Village
- Location within Turkey
- Coordinates: 37.600°N 41.228°E
- Country: Turkey
- Province: Batman
- District: Gercüş
- Population (2021): 548
- Time zone: UTC+3 (TRT)

Hisar (Kurdish: Hesar) is a village in the Gercüş District of Batman Province in Turkey. The village is populated by Kurds of the Hesar tribe and had a population of 548 in 2021. Before the 2013 reorganisation, it was a town (belde).

The hamlet of Ekinli is attached to the village.

== Notable people ==
- Cigerxwîn (1903–1984), Kurdish writer and poet
