= Koyunlu, Gercüş =

Village in Batman Province, Turkey

Koyunlu
- Village
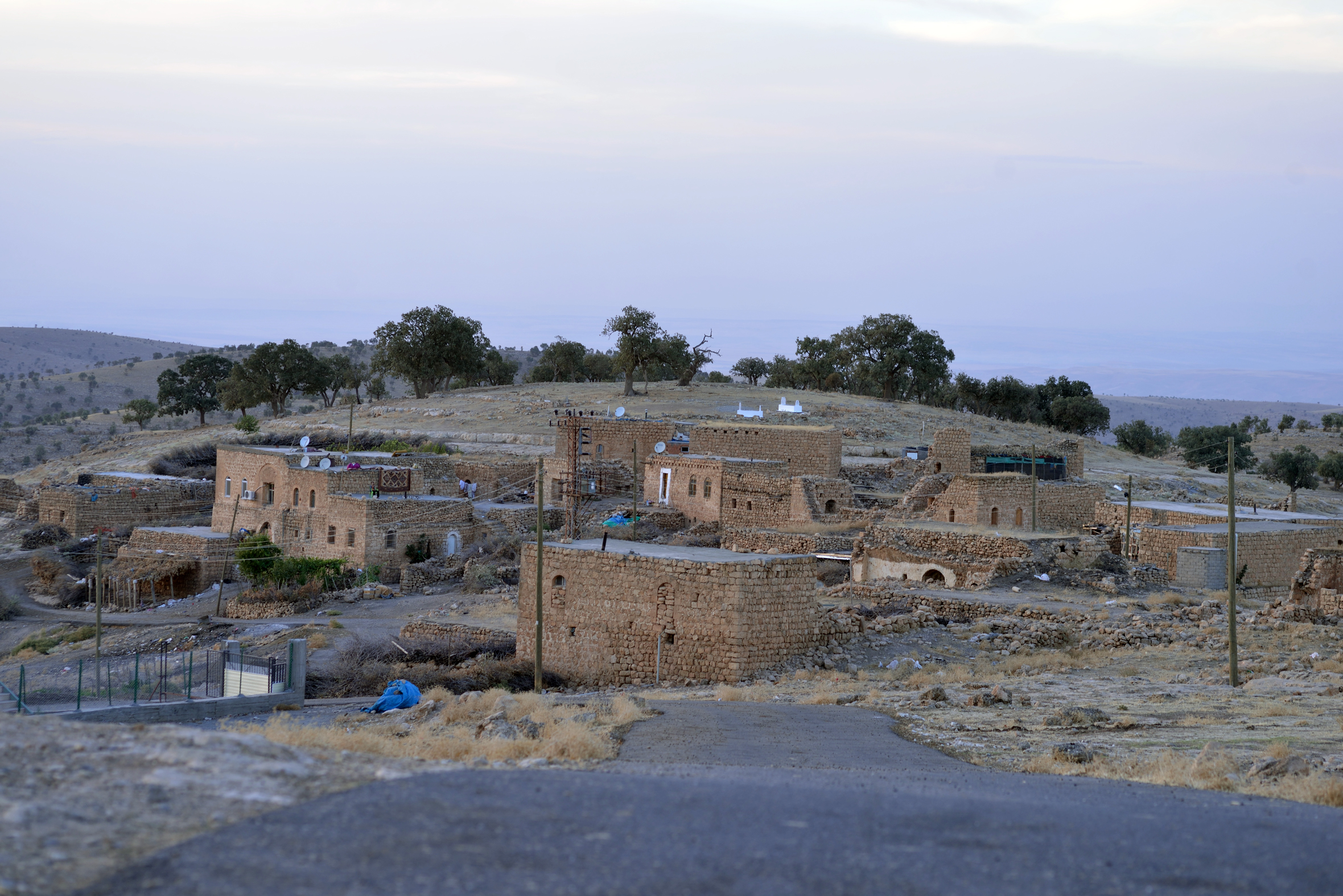

- Location within Turkey
- Coordinates: 37.658°N 41.086°E
- Country: Turkey
- Province: Batman
- District: Gercüş
- Population (2021): 35
- Time zone: UTC+3 (TRT)

Koyunlu (Kurdish: Baqolînê) is a village in the Gercüş District of Batman Province in Turkey. The village is populated by Kurds of the Habezbenî tribe and had a population of 35 in 2021.
