= Ulaş, Gercüş =

Village in Batman Province, Turkey

Ulaş
- Village
- Location within Turkey
- Coordinates: 37.581°N 41.541°E
- Country: Turkey
- Province: Batman
- District: Gercüş
- Population (2021): 222
- Time zone: UTC+3 (TRT)

Ulaş (Kurdish: Zêliyê) is a village in the Gercüş District of Batman Province in Turkey. The village is populated by Kurds of the Dermemikan tribe and had a population of 222 in 2021.
