= Azamora splendens =

Scientific classification
- Domain: Eukaryota
- Kingdom: Animalia
- Phylum: Arthropoda
- Class: Insecta
- Order: Lepidoptera
- Family: Pyralidae
- Genus: Azamora
- Species: A. splendens

Binomial name
- Azamora splendens (H. Druce, 1895)

Synonyms
- Catadupa splendens H. Druce, 1895

Species of moth

Azamora splendens is a species of snout moth in the genus Azamora. It was described by Herbert Druce in 1895 and is known from Panama.
