= Dereli, Gercüş =

Village in Batman Province, Turkey

Dereli
- Village
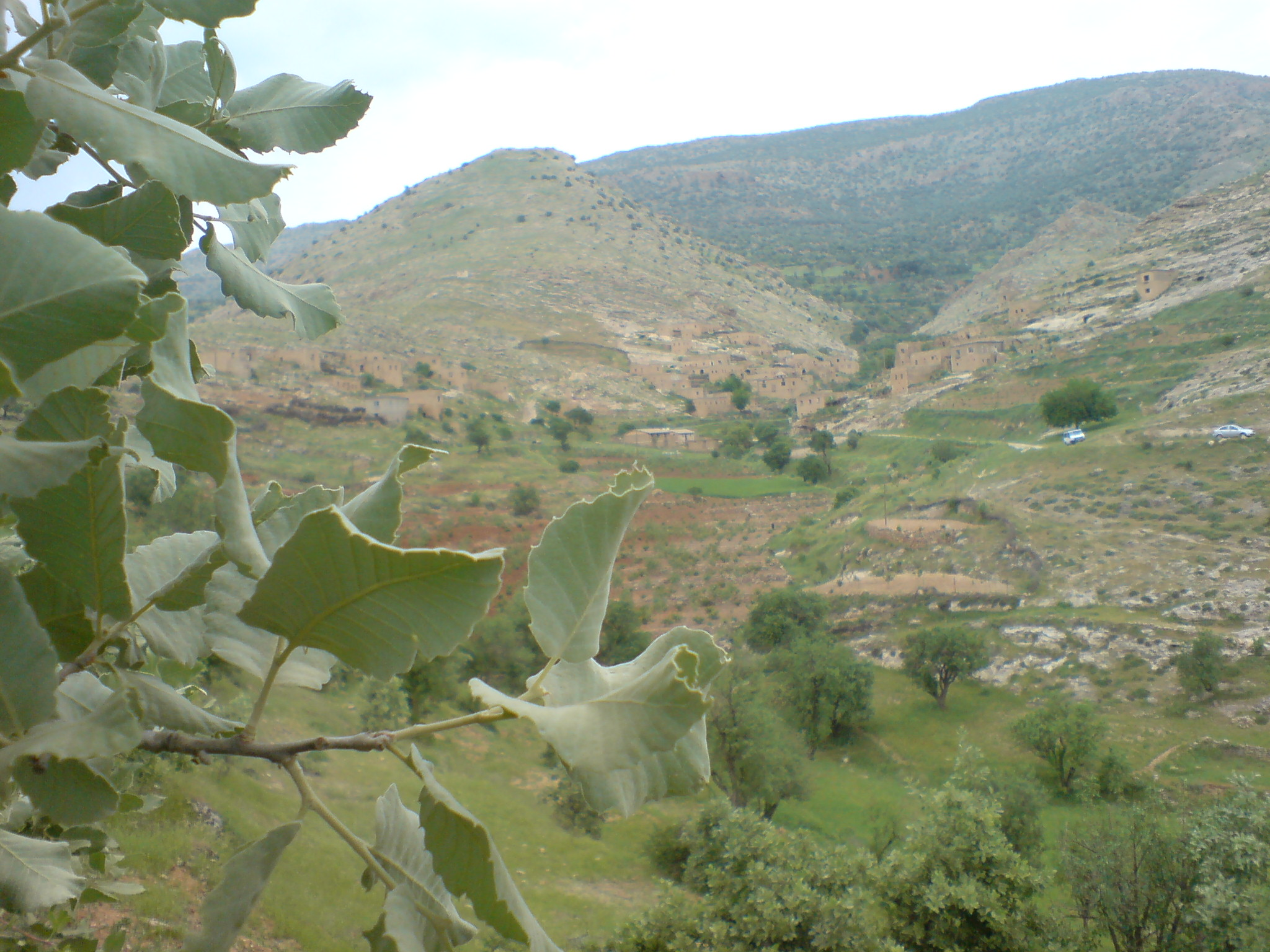

- Location within Turkey
- Coordinates: 37.656°N 41.656°E
- Country: Turkey
- Province: Batman
- District: Gercüş
- Population (2021): 58
- Time zone: UTC+3 (TRT)

Dereli (Kurdish: Êzdara) is a village in the Gercüş District of Batman Province in Turkey. The village is populated by Kurds of the Basiqil tribe and had a population of 58 in 2021.
