= Poyraz, Gercüş =

Village in Batman Province, Turkey

Poyraz
- Village
- Location within Turkey
- Coordinates: 37.666°N 41.636°E
- Country: Turkey
- Province: Batman
- District: Gercüş
- Population (2021): 53
- Time zone: UTC+3 (TRT)

Poyraz (Kurdish: Berdahol) is a village in the Gercüş District of Batman Province in Turkey. The village is populated by Kurds of the Basiqil tribe and had a population of 53 in 2021.
