= Yenice, Gercüş =

Village in Batman Province, Turkey

Yenice
- Village
- Location within Turkey
- Coordinates: 37.526°N 41.192°E
- Country: Turkey
- Province: Batman
- District: Gercüş
- Population (2021): 185
- Time zone: UTC+3 (TRT)

Yenice (or Nunib) is a village in the Gercüş District of Batman Province in Turkey. The village is populated by Arabs and had a population of 185 in 2021.
