= Doruk, Gercüş =

Village in Batman Province, Turkey

Doruk
- Village
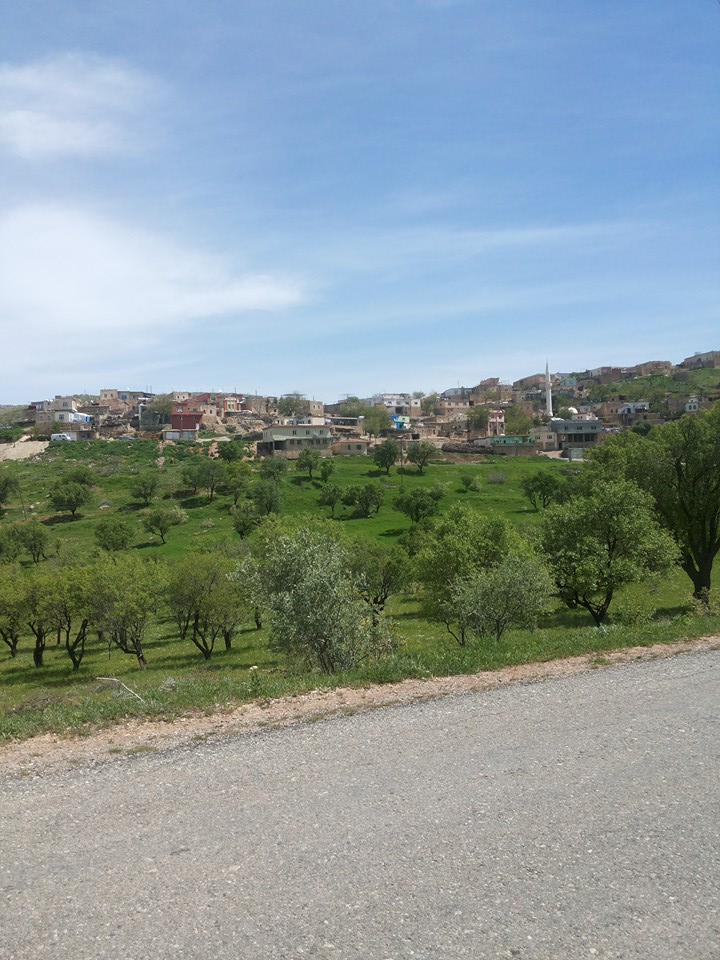

- Location within Turkey
- Coordinates: 37.586°N 41.156°E
- Country: Turkey
- Province: Batman
- District: Gercüş
- Population (2021): 242
- Time zone: UTC+3 (TRT)

Doruk (Kurdish: Qesrik) is a village in the Gercüş District of Batman Province in Turkey. The village is populated by Kurds of the Habezbenî tribe and had a population of 242 in 2021.

The hamlet of Doruk is attached to the village.
