= Bağlıca, Gercüş =

Village in Batman Province, Turkey

Bağlıca
- Village
- Location within Turkey
- Coordinates: 37.626°N 41.159°E
- Country: Turkey
- Province: Batman
- District: Gercüş
- Population (2021): 148
- Time zone: UTC+3 (TRT)

Bağlıca (Kurdish: Midêlbê) is a village in the Gercüş District of Batman Province in Turkey. The village is populated by Kurds of the Habezbenî tribe and had a population of 148 in 2021.
