= Çukuryurt, Gercüş =

Village in Batman Province, Turkey

Çukuryurt
- Village
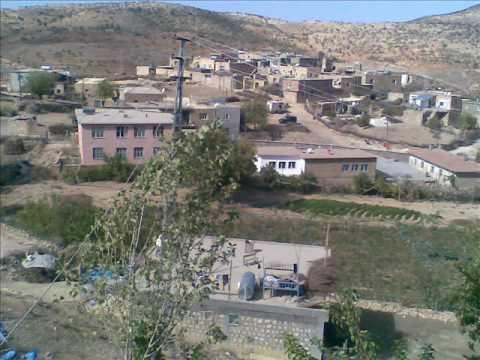

- Location within Turkey
- Coordinates: 37.589°N 41.484°E
- Country: Turkey
- Province: Batman
- District: Gercüş
- Population (2021): 478
- Time zone: UTC+3 (TRT)

Çukuryurt (Kurdish: Binkelbê; Syriac: Ben-Kelbe) (Note: Alternatively transliterated as Bankalbo, Bar Kalbeh, Bēṯkälbe, Benkalbē, Benkalbī, Benkelbe, Binkelb, Binkēlbe, Binkelbe, Binkelp, or Bin Kalbe. Also known as Tel Kalbeh or Ib’n Kelbe. Nisba: Binkēlbī.) is a village in the Gercüş District of Batman Province in Turkey. The village is populated by Kurds of the Arnas tribe and had a population of 478 in 2021. It is located in the historic region of Tur Abdin. The hamlet of Tutumlu is attached to the village.

== History ==
Ben-Kelbe (today called Çukuryurt) has been tentatively identified with the village of Bar Kalbe mentioned in the Life of Simeon of the Olives (d. 734). In the Syriac Orthodox patriarchal register of dues of 1870, it was recorded that there were twenty-seven households, who paid twenty-seven dues, and the village did not have a church or a priest. In 1915, it was inhabited by 30 or 35 Syriac families. The village served as the residence of two feuding Kurdish clan leaders, Izzeddin, chief of the Tammero clan, and Shamdin from the clan of Hasan Shamdin, with the village's Syriac population also divided in their allegiances between the two. Amidst the Sayfo, Izzeddin and Shamdin escorted their respective closest Syriac allies and their families to safety at ‘Ayn-Wardo whilst those who were left behind at Ben-Kelbe were killed. There were 125 Kurdish-speaking Christians at Ben-Kelbe in 1966. The village was populated by 12 Syriac families in 1978. By 1979/1980, there were no remaining Syriacs at the village.

== Bibliography ==
- Atto, Naures (2011). Hostages in the Homeland, Orphans in the Diaspora: Identity Discourses Among the Assyrian/Syriac Elites in the European Diaspora (PDF). Leiden University Press.
- Barsoum, Aphrem (2008). The History of Tur Abdin. Translated by Matti Moosa. Gorgias Press.
- Bcheiry, Iskandar (2009). The Syriac Orthodox Patriarchal Register of Dues of 1870: An Unpublished Historical Document from the Late Ottoman Period. Gorgias Press.
- Courtois, Sébastien de (2004). The Forgotten Genocide: Eastern Christians, The Last Arameans. Translated by Vincent Aurora. Gorgias Press.
- Dinno, Khalid S. (2017). The Syrian Orthodox Christians in the Late Ottoman Period and Beyond: Crisis then Revival. Gorgias Press.
- Gaunt, David (2006). Massacres, Resistance, Protectors: Muslim-Christian Relations in Eastern Anatolia during World War I. Gorgias Press.
- Hoyland, Robert G.; Brunner, Kyle B.; Tannous, Jack Boulos Victor (2021). The Life of Simeon of the Olives: An Entrepreneurial Saint of Early Islamic North Mesopotamia. Gorgias Press LLC. ISBN 978-1-4632-4346-3.
- Keser-Kayaalp, Elif, ed. (January 2022). Syriac Architectural Heritage at Risk in TurʿAbdin (PDF).
- Palmer, Andrew (1990). Monk and Mason on the Tigris Frontier: The Early History of Tur Abdin. Cambridge University Press.
- Ritter, Hellmut (1967). Turoyo: Die Volkssprache der Syrischen Christen des Tur 'Abdin (in German). Vol. 1. Franz Steiner Verlag.
- Talmon-Heller, Daniella; Cytryn-Silverman, Katia, eds. (2014). Material Evidence and Narrative Sources: Interdisciplinary Studies of the History of the Muslim Middle East. Brill.
- Tan, Altan (2018). Turabidin'den Berriye'ye. Aşiretler - Dinler - Diller - Kültürler (in Turkish). Pak Ajans Yayincilik Turizm Ve Diş Ticaret Limited şirketi. ISBN 9789944360944.
