= Eymir, Gercüş =

Village in Batman Province, Turkey

Eymir
- Village
- Location within Turkey
- Coordinates: 37.708°N 41.067°E
- Country: Turkey
- Province: Batman
- District: Gercüş
- Population (2021): 110
- Time zone: UTC+3 (TRT)

Eymir (Kurdish: Çalan) is a village in the Gercüş District of Batman Province in Turkey. The village is populated by Kurds of the Habezbenî tribe and had a population of 110 in 2021.
