= Julius Yeshu Çiçek =

Mor Mor Julius Yeshu Çiçek
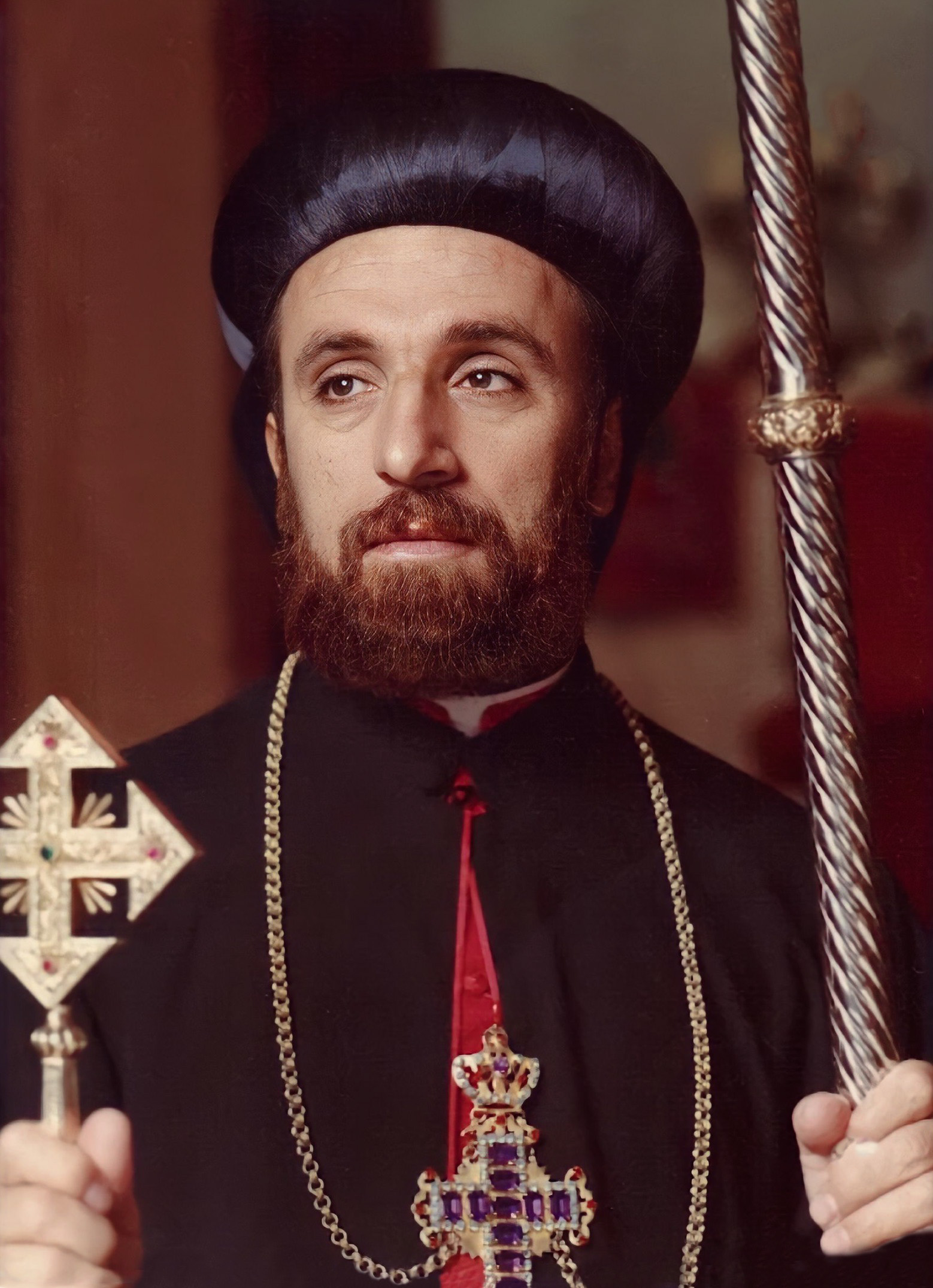
- Portrait of Archbishop Mor Julius Yeshu Çiçek
- Born: 1 January 1942; Kafro `Elayto
- Died: 29 October 2005 (aged 63); Düsseldorf, Germany
- Known for: Syriac Orthodox Archbishop

Mor Julius Yeshu Çiçek (Turkish: Yulyus Yeşu Çiçek, born 1 January 1942 in Kafro `Elayto, Tur Abdin, Turkey – died 29 October 2005 in Düsseldorf, Germany) was the first Syriac Orthodox Church archbishop for Central Europe. He was openly and strongly advocating an Aramean identity for his people. He wrote over one hundred works, some of them in Aramaic.

== Life ==
Çiçek was born on March 25, 1942, in Kafro Elayto, Tur Abdin, as the son of Syriac Orthodox priest Barsaumo (1908–1993) and his wife (Bath Qyomo) Sayde († 1991). He came from a long line of clergy, with both his grandfather Yusuf and great-grandfather Aho serving as active clergy in the Tur Abdin region. At the age of nine, he entered the seminary of Deyr-ul-Za'faran, where he studied Syriac, Turkish, Arabic, and theology. After 1958, he was ordained as a deacon and served as secretary to the later metropolitan Mor Philoxenos Yuhanon Dolabani. He then joined the monastery of Mor Cyriacus in Bsheriye and became involved in the search for surviving Syriac and Armenian Christians after the 1915 genocide.

In 1960, he entered the monastery of Mor Gabriel and became a teacher at its theological seminary. Yeshu Çiçek was elected abbot, and in 1969, he was ordained as priest monk by Mor Iwannis Ephrem Bilgic. After spending time in Damascus and at the Seminary of Mor Ephrem in Atshane, Lebanon, as well as in the Holy Land, he moved to Germany. Following a brief stay in the United States between 1975 and 1977, on the advice of Metropolitan Mor Samuel, he returned to Europe, settling in Hengelo. In 1977, the Holy Synod appointed him patriarchal vicar for the Diocese of Central and Eastern Europe. He played a key role in building a new church, St. John the Evangelist, which was consecrated by Patriarch Ignatius Jacob III.

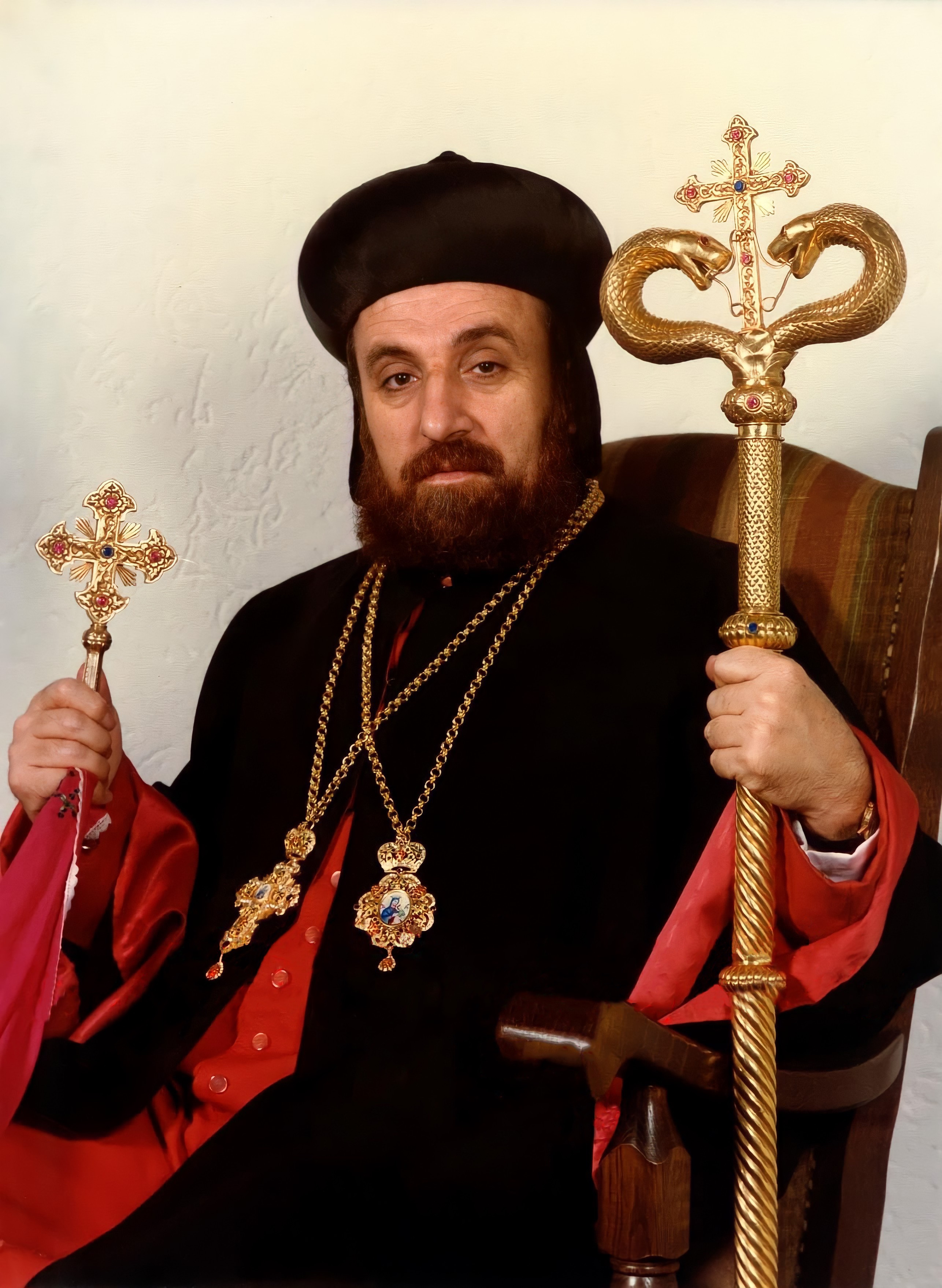
Çiçek

On June 24, 1979, he was consecrated with the name Mor Julius by Patriarch Jacob III. In 1984, he purchased the former Catholic monastery of St. Ephrem Suryoyo in Losser, Netherlands, and made it the seat of his archbishopric. The church also had large monasteries in Enschede, the Netherlands, Arth in Switzerland, and Warburg in Germany. In these monasteries, he built schools and trained clerics in the tradition of the Syriac Orthodox Church. Mor Julius published over 100 books through Bar Hebraeus-Verlag, covering topics related to the Syriac Orthodox liturgy, Bible, history, and other subjects in Syriac and European languages. He also participated in ecumenical dialogues with the Catholic Church through Pro Oriente and accompanied Patriarch Mor Ignatius Zakka I Iwas during his historic visit to Rome in 1984, where a Joint Declaration was signed with Pope John Paul II. In 1988, he attended the Dutch celebration of the 1000th anniversary of the Russian Orthodox Church in Zwolle, which was attended by Queen Beatrix of the Netherlands.

Mor Julius died on October 29, 2005, in Düsseldorf, during a trip from Glane to Switzerland, where he was to attend a congress. His funeral took place on November 5, 2005, after which he was buried in the mausoleum of the Mor Ephrem Suryoyo Monastery in Glane, Netherlands. His burial was marked by a procession, where his body was carried by the crowd with a bishop's staff and cross. Mor Julius is the only person, apart from the Dutch royal family, to be buried in the mausoleum instead of being interred elsewhere.

After his death, his archdiocese was divided into dioceses for the Netherlands, Belgium/France/Luxembourg, and Switzerland/Austria. In 2015, the following individuals were appointed as heads of each diocesan region: Polycarpus Augin Aydin for the Netherlands, Severius Hazail Saume for Belgium/France/Luxembourg, and Dionysius Isa Gürbüz for Switzerland/Austria.
