= Boğazköy, Gercüş =

Village in Batman Province, Turkey

Boğazköy
- Village
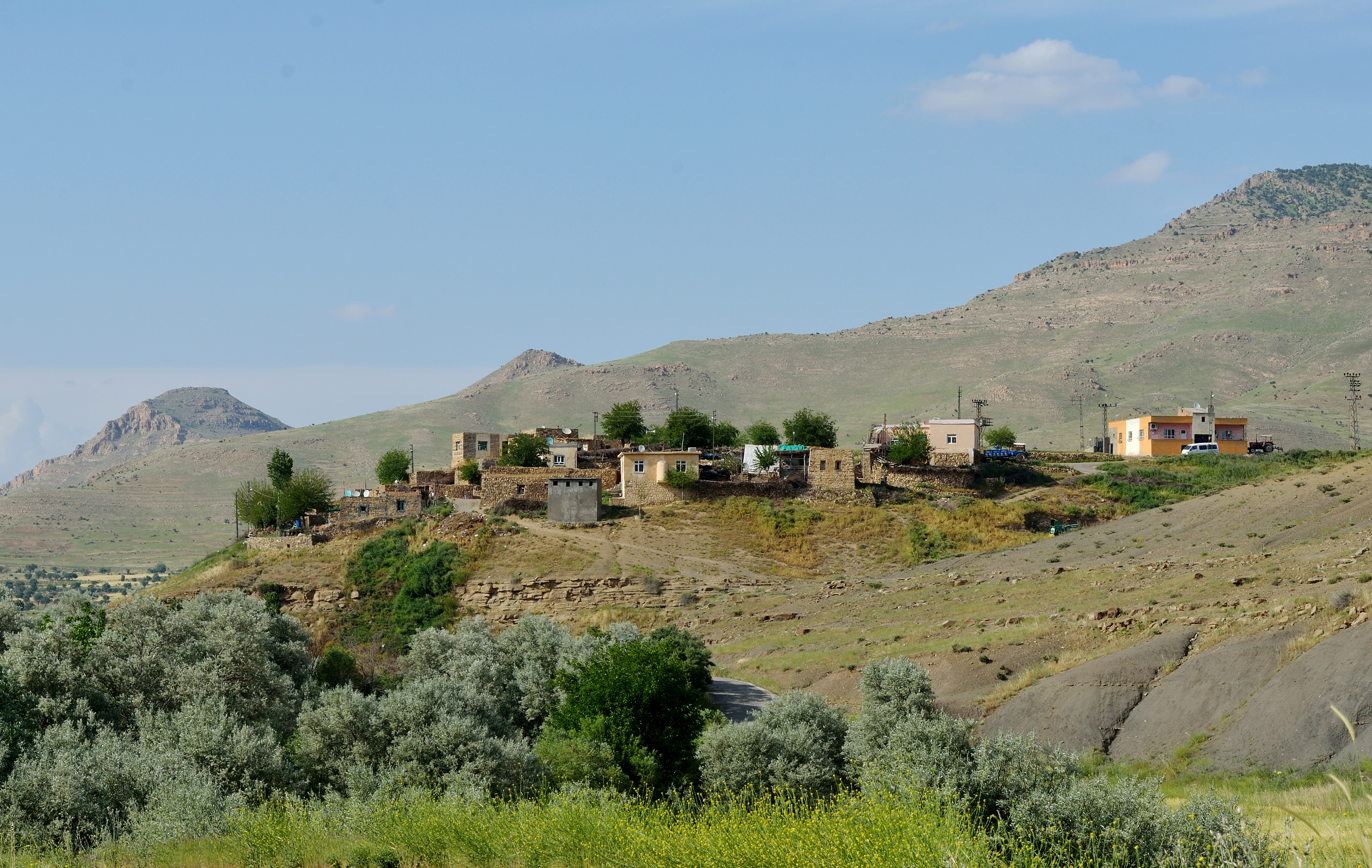
- Hamlet of Akça (Şêrşê)

- Location within Turkey
- Coordinates: 37.643°N 41.306°E
- Country: Turkey
- Province: Batman
- District: Gercüş
- Population (2021): 231
- Time zone: UTC+3 (TRT)

Boğazköy (Kurdish: Bagasê) is a village in the Gercüş District of Batman Province in Turkey. The village is populated by Kurds of the Hesar tribe and had a population of 231 in 2021.

The hamlet of Akça (Şêrşê) is attached to the village.
