= Gökçe, Gercüş =

Village in Batman Province, Turkey

Tepecik
- Village
- Location within Turkey
- Coordinates: 37.601°N 41.134°E
- Country: Turkey
- Province: Batman
- District: Gercüş
- Population (2021): 149
- Time zone: UTC+3 (TRT)

Tepecik (Kurdish: Mala Mihê) is a village in the Gercüş District of Batman Province in Turkey. The village is populated by Kurds of the Habezbenî tribe and had a population of 149 in 2021.
