= Azamora crameriana =

Scientific classification
- Domain: Eukaryota
- Kingdom: Animalia
- Phylum: Arthropoda
- Class: Insecta
- Order: Lepidoptera
- Family: Pyralidae
- Genus: Azamora
- Species: A. crameriana

Binomial name
- Azamora crameriana (Stoll in Cramer & Stoll, 1781)

Synonyms
- Phalaena crameriana Stoll in Cramer & Stoll, 1781

Species of moth

Azamora crameriana is a species of snout moth in the genus Azamora. It was described by Stoll in 1781, and is known from Suriname.
