= Kayalar, Gercüş =

Village in Batman Province, Turkey

Kayalar
- Village
- Location within Turkey
- Coordinates: 37.672°N 41.332°E
- Country: Turkey
- Province: Batman
- District: Gercüş
- Population (2021): 111
- Time zone: UTC+3 (TRT)

Kayalar (Kurdish: Barlatê; Syriac: Barlat) (Note: Alternatively transliterated as Barlât.) is a village in the Gercüş District of Batman Province in Turkey. The village is populated by Kurds of the Reman tribe and had a population of 111 in 2021.

== History ==
Barlat (today called Kayalar) was historically inhabited by Syriac Orthodox Christians. In 1915, there were 10 Syriac families. Amidst the Sayfo, some Syriacs were killed. By 1987, there were no remaining Syriacs at Barlat.

== Bibliography ==
- Courtois, Sébastien de (2004). The Forgotten Genocide: Eastern Christians, The Last Arameans. Translated by Vincent Aurora. Gorgias Press.
- Gaunt, David (2006). Massacres, Resistance, Protectors: Muslim-Christian Relations in Eastern Anatolia during World War I. Gorgias Press.
- Jongerden, Joost; Verheij, Jelle, eds. (2012). Social Relations in Ottoman Diyarbekir, 1870-1915. Brill.
- Tan, Altan (2018). Turabidin'den Berriye'ye. Aşiretler - Dinler - Diller - Kültürler (in Turkish). Pak Ajans Yayincilik Turizm Ve Diş Ticaret Limited şirketi. ISBN 9789944360944.
