= Serinköy, Gercüş =

Village in Batman Province, Turkey

Serinköy
- Village
- Location within Turkey
- Coordinates: 37.623°N 41.533°E
- Country: Turkey
- Province: Batman
- District: Gercüş
- Population (2021): 11
- Time zone: UTC+3 (TRT)

Serinköy (Kurdish: Mercîya, Merce) is a village in the Gercüş District of Batman Province in Turkey. The village is populated by Kurds of the Bêcirmanî tribe and had a population of 11 in 2021.
