= Azamora corusca =

Scientific classification
- Domain: Eukaryota
- Kingdom: Animalia
- Phylum: Arthropoda
- Class: Insecta
- Order: Lepidoptera
- Family: Pyralidae
- Genus: Azamora
- Species: A. corusca

Binomial name
- Azamora corusca (Lederer, 1863)

Synonyms
- Amblyura corusca Lederer, 1863

Species of moth

Azamora corusca is a species of snout moth in the genus Azamora. It was described by Julius Lederer in 1863, and is known from Venezuela and Brazil.
