= Azamora tortriciformis =

Scientific classification
- Kingdom: Animalia
- Phylum: Arthropoda
- Class: Insecta
- Order: Lepidoptera
- Family: Pyralidae
- Genus: Azamora
- Species: A. tortriciformis

Binomial name
- Azamora tortriciformis Walker, 1858

Synonyms
- Azamora basiplaga Walker, 1862; Thylacophora hepaticalis Ragonot, 1891

Species of moth

Azamora tortriciformis is a species of snout moth in the genus Azamora. It was described by Francis Walker in 1858, and is known from Brazil.
