= Aydınca, Gercüş =

Village in Batman Province, Turkey

Aydınca
- Village
- Location within Turkey
- Coordinates: 37.625°N 41.621°E
- Country: Turkey
- Province: Batman
- District: Gercüş
- Population (2021): 76
- Time zone: UTC+3 (TRT)

Aydınca (Kurdish: Sira) is a village in the Gercüş District of Batman Province in Turkey. The village is populated by Kurds of the Basiqil tribe and had a population of 76 in 2021.
