= Güzelöz, Gercüş =

Village in Batman Province, Turkey

Güzelöz
- Village
- Location within Turkey
- Coordinates: 37.630°N 41.558°E
- Country: Turkey
- Province: Batman
- District: Gercüş
- Population (2021): 158
- Time zone: UTC+3 (TRT)

Güzelöz (Kurdish: Bêdarê) is a village in the Gercüş District of Batman Province in Turkey. The village is populated by Kurds of the Elîkan tribe and had a population of 158 in 2021.

The hamlet of Kaynarca is attached to the village.
