= Karalan, Gercüş =

Village in Batman Province, Turkey

Karalan
- Village
- Location within Turkey
- Coordinates: 37.622°N 41.322°E
- Country: Turkey
- Province: Batman
- District: Gercüş
- Population (2021): 105
- Time zone: UTC+3 (TRT)

Karalan (Kurdish: Qarmut) is a village in the Gercüş District of Batman Province in Turkey. The village is populated by Kurds of the Hesar tribe and had a population of 105 in 2021.

The hamlet of Esentepe is attached to the village.
