= Başarköy, Gercüş =

Village in Batman Province, Turkey

Başarköy
- Village
- Location within Turkey
- Coordinates: 37.624°N 41.418°E
- Country: Turkey
- Province: Batman
- District: Gercüş
- Population (2021): 37
- Time zone: UTC+3 (TRT)

Başarköy (Kurdish: Êdawa; Syriac: Eldawā) (Note: Alternatively transliterated as Erdeva, İrdeva, or İrdeve.) is a village in the Gercüş District of Batman Province in Turkey. The village is populated by Kurds of the Kercoz tribe and had a population of 37 in 2021. It is located in the historic region of Tur Abdin.

== History ==
Eldawā (today called Başarköy) was historically inhabited by Syriac Orthodox Christians. In the Syriac Orthodox patriarchal register of dues of 1870, it was recorded that the village had 3 households, who paid 5 dues, and did not have a church or a priest. It is tentatively identified with the village of Ylova, which was populated by 150 Syriacs in 1914, according to the list presented to the Paris Peace Conference by the Assyro-Chaldean delegation. It was located in the kaza of Midyat.

== Bibliography ==
- Bcheiry, Iskandar (2009). The Syriac Orthodox Patriarchal Register of Dues of 1870: An Unpublished Historical Document from the Late Ottoman Period. Gorgias Press.
- Gaunt, David (2006). Massacres, Resistance, Protectors: Muslim-Christian Relations in Eastern Anatolia during World War I. Gorgias Press.
- Jongerden, Joost; Verheij, Jelle, eds. (2012). Social Relations in Ottoman Diyarbekir, 1870-1915. Brill.
- Tan, Altan (2018). Turabidin'den Berriye'ye. Aşiretler - Dinler - Diller - Kültürler (in Turkish). Pak Ajans Yayincilik Turizm Ve Diş Ticaret Limited şirketi. ISBN 9789944360944.
