= Akyar, Gercüş =

Village in Batman Province, Turkey

Akyar
- Village
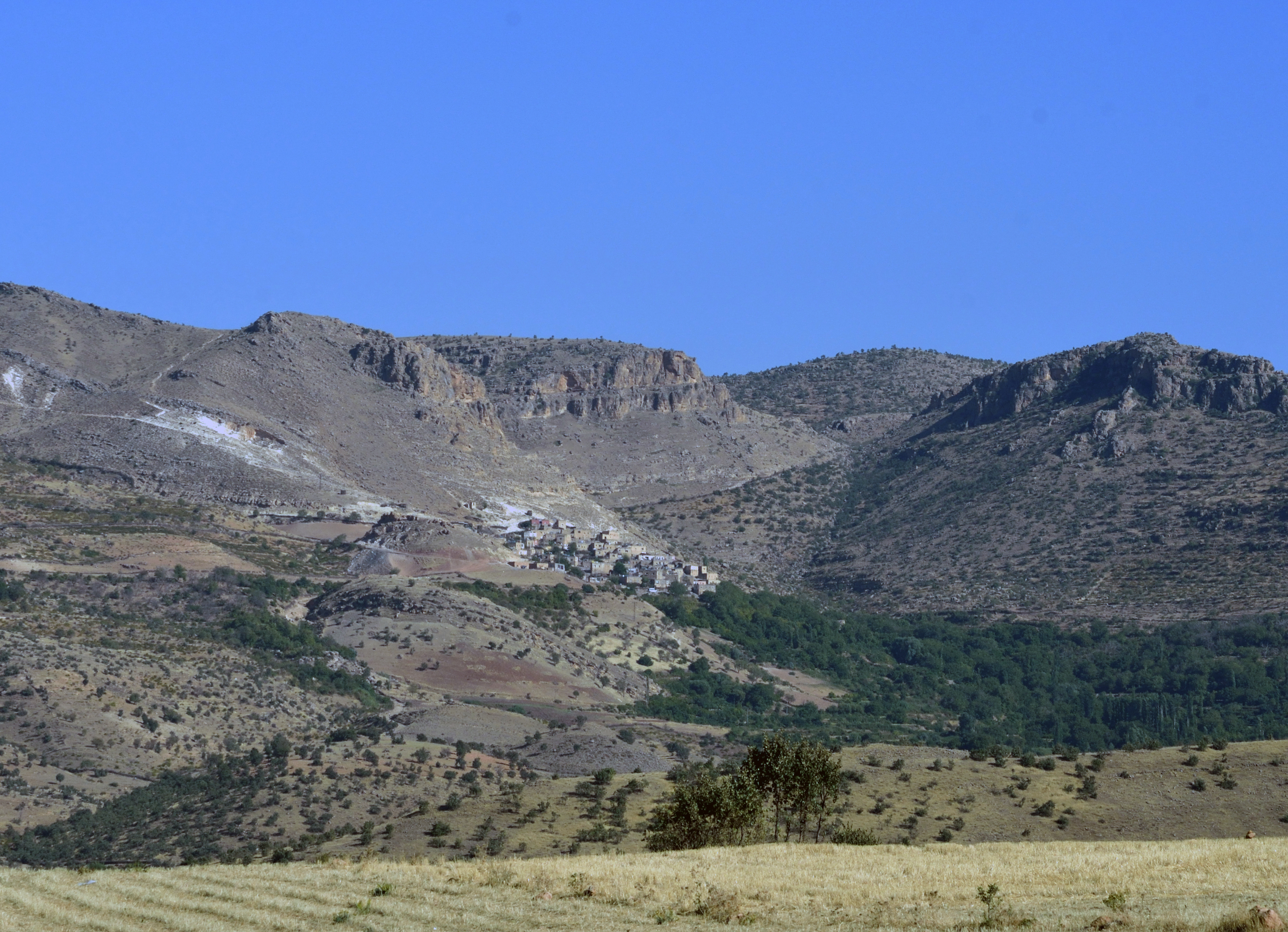

- Location within Turkey
- Coordinates: 37.647°N 41.453°E
- Country: Turkey
- Province: Batman
- District: Gercüş
- Population (2021): 256
- Time zone: UTC+3 (TRT)

Akyar (Kurdish: Mervanîye; Syriac: Marwaniye) (Note: Alternatively transliterated as Marvani, Marwaniyeh, or Mervani.) is a village in the Gercüş District of Batman Province in Turkey. The village is populated by Kurds of the Kercoz tribe and had a population of 256 in 2021.

== History ==
Marwaniye (today called Akyar) was historically inhabited by Syriac Orthodox Christians. There were ten Syriac families in 1915. Amidst the Sayfo, all but one of the Syriacs at Marwaniye were murdered. By 1987, there were no remaining Syriacs.

== Bibliography ==
- Courtois, Sébastien de (2004). The Forgotten Genocide: Eastern Christians, The Last Arameans. Translated by Vincent Aurora. Gorgias Press.
- Gaunt, David (2006). Massacres, Resistance, Protectors: Muslim-Christian Relations in Eastern Anatolia during World War I. Gorgias Press.
- Jongerden, Joost; Verheij, Jelle, eds. (2012). Social Relations in Ottoman Diyarbekir, 1870-1915. Brill.
- Tan, Altan (2011). Turabidin'den Berriye'ye. Aşiretler - Dinler - Diller - Kültürler (in Turkish).
