= Yayladüzü, Gercüş =

Village in Batman Province, Turkey

Yayladüzü
- Village
- Location within Turkey
- Coordinates: 37.625°N 41.135°E
- Country: Turkey
- Province: Batman
- District: Gercüş
- Population (2021): 190
- Time zone: UTC+3 (TRT)

Yayladüzü (Kurdish: Gundik) is a village in the Gercüş District of Batman Province in Turkey. The village is populated by Kurds of the Habezbenî tribe and had a population of 190 in 2021.

The hamlet of Dereli is attached to the village.
