= Babnir, Gercüş =

Village in Batman Province, Turkey

Babnir
- Village
- Location within Turkey
- Coordinates: 37.615°N 41.195°E
- Country: Turkey
- Province: Batman
- District: Gercüş
- Population (2021): 273
- Time zone: UTC+3 (TRT)

Babnir (formerly Sapanlı, Kurdish: Babinîr) is a village in the Gercüş District of Batman Province in Turkey. The village is populated by Kurds of the Hesar tribe and had a population of 273 in 2021.

The hamlet of Mağarali is attached to the village.
