= Gürbüz, Gercüş =

Village in Batman Province, Turkey

Gürbüz
- Village
- Location within Turkey
- Coordinates: 37.636°N 41.429°E
- Country: Turkey
- Province: Batman
- District: Gercüş
- Population (2021): 47
- Time zone: UTC+3 (TRT)

Gürbüz (Kurdish: Xirbeta) is a village in the Gercüş District of Batman Province in Turkey. The village is populated by Kurds of the Kercoz tribe and had a population of 47 in 2021.
