= Azamora penicillana =

Scientific classification
- Kingdom: Animalia
- Phylum: Arthropoda
- Clade: Pancrustacea
- Class: Insecta
- Order: Lepidoptera
- Family: Pyralidae
- Genus: Azamora
- Species: A. penicillana

Binomial name
- Azamora penicillana (Walker, 1863)

Synonyms
- Torda penicillana Walker, 1863; Thylacophora tortricoidalis Ragonot, 1891

Species of moth

Azamora penicillana is a species of snout moth in the genus Azamora. It was described by Francis Walker in 1863, and is known from Brazil and French Guiana.

The larvae have been recorded feeding on Passiflora cincinnata. They cause defoliation, but also cause damage by the phytotoxic effects of the fluid which is secreted by the larvae on the leaves and young stems of the host plant.
