= Tepecik, Gercüş =

Village in Batman Province, Turkey

Tepecik
- Village
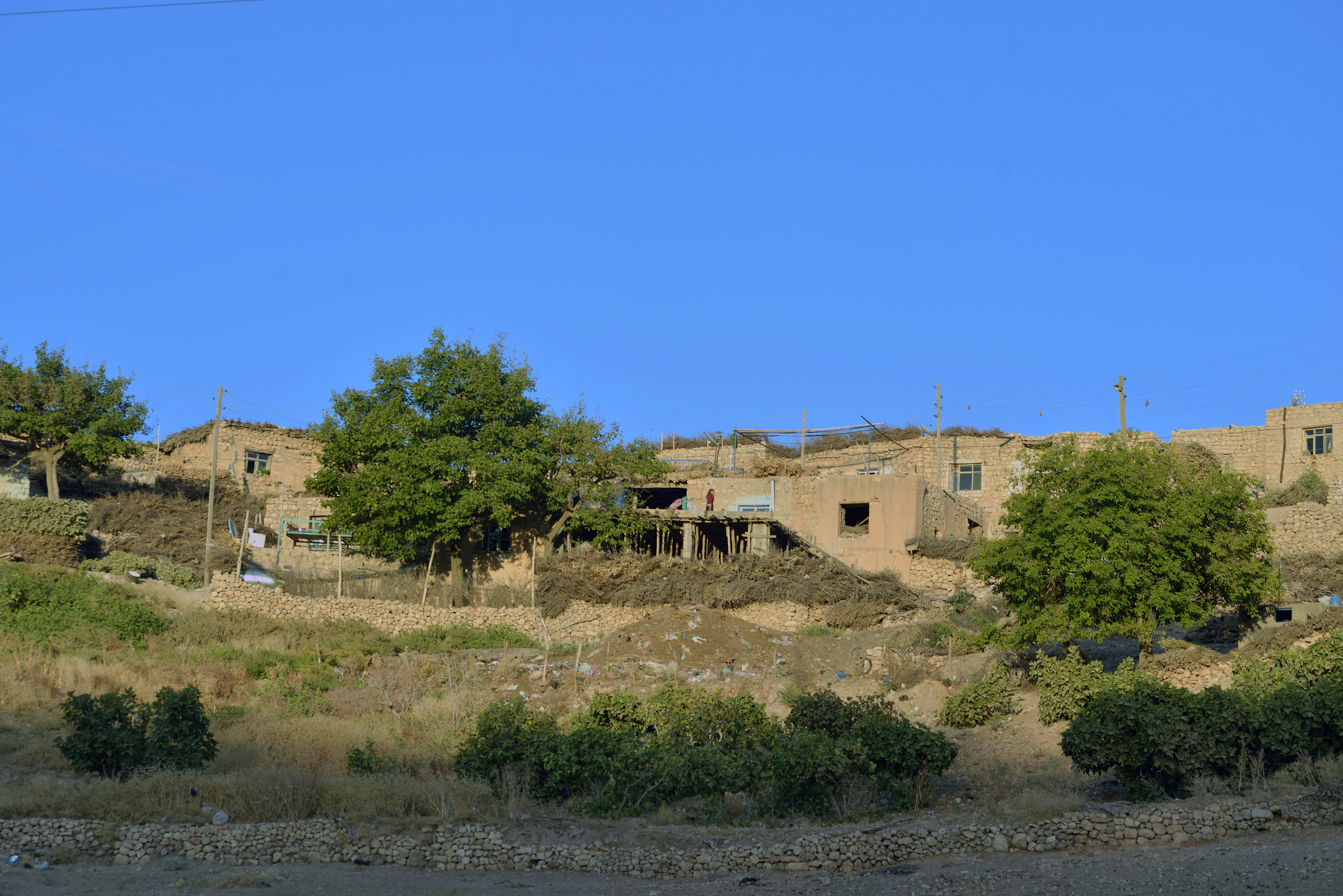

- Location within Turkey
- Coordinates: 37.582°N 41.139°E
- Country: Turkey
- Province: Batman
- District: Gercüş
- Population (2021): 380
- Time zone: UTC+3 (TRT)

Tepecik (Kurdish: Hoska) is a village in the Gercüş District of Batman Province in Turkey. The village is populated by Kurds of the Habezbenî tribe and had a population of 380 in 2021.

The hamlet of Arık is attached to the village.
