= Kozlu, Gercüş =

Village in Batman Province, Turkey

Kozlu
- Village
- Location within Turkey
- Coordinates: 37.637°N 41.368°E
- Country: Turkey
- Province: Batman
- District: Gercüş
- Population (2021): 388
- Time zone: UTC+3 (TRT)

Kozlu (Kurdish: Cumeylînê) is a village in the Gercüş District of Batman Province in Turkey. The village is populated by Kurds of the Reman tribe and had a population of 388 in 2021.
