= Gökçepınar, Gercüş =

Village in Batman Province, Turkey

Gökçepınar
- Village
- Location within Turkey
- Coordinates: 37.589°N 41.520°E
- Country: Turkey
- Province: Batman
- District: Gercüş
- Population (2021): 543
- Time zone: UTC+3 (TRT)

Gökçepınar (Kurdish: Êşê; Syriac: Esya) (Note: Alternatively transliterated as Esi, Esia, or Esse.) is a village in the Gercüş District of Batman Province in Turkey. The village is populated by Kurds of the Dermemikan tribe and had a population of 543 in 2021.

== History ==
Esya (today called Gökçepınar) is attested in the Life of Simeon of the Olives (d. 734).

== Bibliography ==
- Hoyland, Robert G.; Brunner, Kyle B.; Tannous, Jack Boulos Victor (2021). The Life of Simeon of the Olives: An Entrepreneurial Saint of Early Islamic North Mesopotamia. Gorgias Press LLC. ISBN 978-1-4632-4346-3.
- Palmer, Andrew (1990). Monk and Mason on the Tigris Frontier: The Early History of Tur Abdin. Cambridge University Press.
- Tan, Altan (2018). Turabidin'den Berriye'ye. Aşiretler - Dinler - Diller - Kültürler (in Turkish). ISBN 9789944360944.
