= Yakıtlı, Gercüş =

Village in Batman Province, Turkey

Yakıtlı
- Village
- Location within Turkey
- Coordinates: 37.568°N 41.580°E
- Country: Turkey
- Province: Batman
- District: Gercüş
- Population (2021): 306
- Time zone: UTC+3 (TRT)

Yakıtlı (Kurdish: Hirmiz) is a village in the Gercüş District of Batman Province in Turkey. The village is populated by Kurds of the Elîkan tribe and had a population of 306 in 2021.
