= Akburç, Gercüş =

Village in Batman Province, Turkey

Akburç
- Village
- Location within Turkey
- Coordinates: 37.552°N 41.426°E
- Country: Turkey
- Province: Batman
- District: Gercüş
- Population (2021): 153
- Time zone: UTC+3 (TRT)

Akburç (Kurdish: Kelehê) is a village in the Gercüş District of Batman Province in Turkey. The village is populated by Kurds of the Kercoz tribe and had a population of 153 in 2021.
