= Ardıç, Gercüş =

Village in Batman Province, Turkey

Ardıç
- Village
- Location within Turkey
- Coordinates: 37.611°N 41.533°E
- Country: Turkey
- Province: Batman
- District: Gercüş
- Established: 1928
- Elevation: 1,200 m (3,900 ft)
- Population (2022): 30
- Time zone: UTC+3 (TRT)
- Postal code: 72302
- Area code: 0488

Ardıç (Kurdish: Xerbehêmercîya) is a village in the Gercüş District of the Batman Province in Turkey. The village is populated by Kurds of the Kercoz tribe and had a population of 30 as of 2022.

== History ==
The first mention of the village was in a 1928 record, where it used to be called Xirbemerci.

The village reached 224 inhabitants in 1935.

== Geography ==
Ardıç is 78 km (48.5 miles) away from the Batman city center and 18 km (11.2 miles) away from the Gercüş district center.

== Population ==
The village is mostly inhabited by Kurds.

=== Historical population ===
Historical population
| Year | Pop. | ±% |
|---|---|---|
| 1935 | 224 | — |
| 1985 | 101 | −54.9% |
| 1990 | 47 | −53.5% |
| 2000 | 37 | −21.3% |
| 2007 | 26 | −29.7% |
| 2008 | 20 | −23.1% |
| 2009 | 15 | −25.0% |
| 2010 | 1 | −93.3% |
| 2011 | 14 | +1300.0% |
| 2012 | 6 | −57.1% |
| 2013 | 11 | +83.3% |
| 2014 | 5 | −54.5% |
| 2015 | 16 | +220.0% |
| 2018 | 18 | +12.5% |
| 2019 | 14 | −22.2% |
| 2020 | 17 | +21.4% |
| 2021 | 16 | −5.9% |
| 2022 | 30 | +87.5% |
