= Ardıçlı, Gercüş =

Village in Batman Province, Turkey

Ardıçlı
- Village
- Location within Turkey
- Coordinates: 37.617°N 41.153°E
- Country: Turkey
- Province: Batman
- District: Gercüş

Government
  - Muhtar: Vasfi Keklik
- Elevation: 1,050 m (3,440 ft)
- Population (2021): 209
- Time zone: UTC+3 (TRT)

Ardıçlı (Kurdish: Ecibê) is a village in the Gercüş District of the Batman Province in Turkey. The village is populated by Kurds of the Habezbenî tribe and had a population of 209 in 2021 and its population density is 53 inhabitants per km^{2}. The village is located at an elevation of about 1,050 meters (3,445 feet) above sea level.

== History ==
Its first recorded mention was in 1920, where it used to be called Acîb, afterwards its name would be changed again as Aciya in 1977. It isn't known when the village changed its name to the modern-day Ardıçlı.

== Geography ==
The village is 81 km away from Batman city center and 21 km away from the Gercüş district center.

== Population ==
=== Historical population ===
Historical population
Year	Pop.	±%
1990	333	—
2000	169	−49.2%
2007	217	+28.4%
2008	276	+27.2%
2009	220	−20.3%
2010	230	+4.5%
2011	213	−7.4%
2012	204	−4.2%
2013	216	+5.9%
2014	185	−14.4%
2015	176	−4.9%
2016	197	+11.9%
2017	176	−10.7%
2018	247	+40.3%
2019	223	−9.7%
2020	195	−12.6%
2021	209	+7.2%

== Education ==
Ardıçlı has a primary school.
