= Azamora pelopsana =

Scientific classification
- Kingdom: Animalia
- Phylum: Arthropoda
- Class: Insecta
- Order: Lepidoptera
- Family: Pyralidae
- Genus: Azamora
- Species: A. pelopsana

Binomial name
- Azamora pelopsana (Walker, 1863)

Synonyms
- Arica pelopsana Walker, 1863

Species of moth

Azamora pelopsana is a species of snout moth in the genus Azamora. It was described by Francis Walker in 1863, and is known to be from Brazil.
