= Yassıca, Gercüş =

Village in Batman Province, Turkey

Yassıca
- Village
- Location within Turkey
- Coordinates: 37.620°N 41.389°E
- Country: Turkey
- Province: Batman
- District: Gercüş
- Population (2021): 71
- Time zone: UTC+3 (TRT)

Yassıca (Kurdish: Ermune; Syriac: Armun) (Note: Alternatively transliterated as Abrimona, Armūnā, Armuna, Ermuni, İrmoni, or İrmuni.) is a village in the Gercüş District of Batman Province in Turkey. The village is populated by Kurds of the Kercoz tribe and had a population of 71 in 2021. It is located in the historic region of Tur Abdin.

== History ==
Armun (today called Yassıca) was historically inhabited by Syriac Orthodox Christians. In the Syriac Orthodox patriarchal register of dues of 1870, it was recorded that Armun had eight households, who paid eighteen dues, and did not have a church or priest. In 1914, the village was populated by 200 Syriacs, according to the list presented to the Paris Peace Conference by the Assyro-Chaldean delegation. It was located in the kaza of Midyat. There were ten Syriac families in 1915. Amidst the Sayfo, the village was attacked by Turkish soldiers and some Kurdish tribesmen, leaving only ten Syriac survivors. By 1987, there were no remaining Syriacs.

== Bibliography ==
- Barsoum, Aphrem (2008). The History of Tur Abdin. Translated by Matti Moosa. Gorgias Press.
- Bcheiry, Iskandar (2009). The Syriac Orthodox Patriarchal Register of Dues of 1870: An Unpublished Historical Document from the Late Ottoman Period. Gorgias Press.
- Courtois, Sébastien de (2004). The Forgotten Genocide: Eastern Christians, The Last Arameans. Translated by Vincent Aurora. Gorgias Press.
- Gaunt, David (2006). Massacres, Resistance, Protectors: Muslim-Christian Relations in Eastern Anatolia during World War I. Gorgias Press.
- Jongerden, Joost; Verheij, Jelle, eds. (2012). Social Relations in Ottoman Diyarbekir, 1870-1915. Brill.
- Tan, Altan (2011). Turabidin'den Berriye'ye. Aşiretler - Dinler - Diller - Kültürler (in Turkish). Pak Ajans Yayincilik Turizm Ve Diş Ticaret Limited şirketi. ISBN 9789944360944.
