= Becirman, Gercüş =

Village in Batman Province, Turkey

Becirman
- Village
- Location within Turkey
- Coordinates: 37.605°N 41.568°E
- Country: Turkey
- Province: Batman
- District: Gercüş
- Population (2021): 194
- Time zone: UTC+3 (TRT)

Becirman (formerly Vergili, Kurdish: Bêcirman) is a village in the Gercüş District of Batman Province in Turkey. The village is populated by Kurds of the Bêcirmanî and Elîkan tribes and had a population of 194 in 2021.
