= Kesiksu, Gercüş =

Village in Batman Province, Turkey

Kesiksu
- Village
- Location within Turkey
- Coordinates: 37.637°N 41.400°E
- Country: Turkey
- Province: Batman
- District: Gercüş
- Population (2021): 115
- Time zone: UTC+3 (TRT)

Kesiksu (Kurdish: Narqatîn) is a village in the Gercüş District of Batman Province in Turkey. The village is populated by Kurds of the Kercoz tribe and had a population of 115 in 2021.
