= Odabaşı =

Odabaşı is a Turkish surname. Notable people with the surname include:

- Ferhat Odabaşı (born 1983), Turkish footballer
- İsmail Haktan Odabaşı (born 1991), Turkish footballer
- Tevfik Odabaşı (born 1981), Turkish wrestler
