= Yemişli, Gercüş =

Village in Batman Province, Turkey

Yemişli
- Village
- Location within Turkey
- Coordinates: 37.655°N 41.685°E
- Country: Turkey
- Province: Batman
- District: Gercüş
- Population (2021): 483
- Time zone: UTC+3 (TRT)

Yemişli (Kurdish: Botika) is a village in the Gercüş District of Batman Province in Turkey. The village is populated by Kurds of the Basiqil tribe and had a population of 483 in 2021.
