= Sargın, Gercüş =

Village in Batman Province, Turkey

Sargın
- Village
- Location within Turkey
- Coordinates: 37.594°N 41.461°E
- Country: Turkey
- Province: Batman
- District: Gercüş
- Population (2021): 49
- Time zone: UTC+3 (TRT)

Sargın (Kurdish: Peparê) is a village in the Gercüş District of Batman Province in Turkey. The village is populated by Kurds of the Kercoz and Reman tribes and had a population of 49 in 2021.
