= Arica, Amazonas =

Arica
- Municipality and town
- Interactive map of Arica
- Location in Colombia
- Coordinates: 2°08′S 71°44′W
- Country: Colombia
- Department: Amazonas Department
- Time zone: UTC-5 (Colombia Standard Time)

Arica is a town in the Amazonas Department, Colombia.
