= Dereiçi, Gercüş =

Village in Batman Province, Turkey

Dereiçi
- Village
- Location within Turkey
- Coordinates: 37.625°N 41.602°E
- Country: Turkey
- Province: Batman
- District: Gercüş
- Population (2021): 46
- Time zone: UTC+3 (TRT)

Dereiçi (Kurdish: Bilexşe) is a village in the Gercüş District of Batman Province in Turkey. The village is populated by Kurds of the Bêcirmanî tribe and had a population of 46 in 2021.
