= Nurlu, Gercüş =

Village in Batman Province, Turkey

Nurlu
- Village
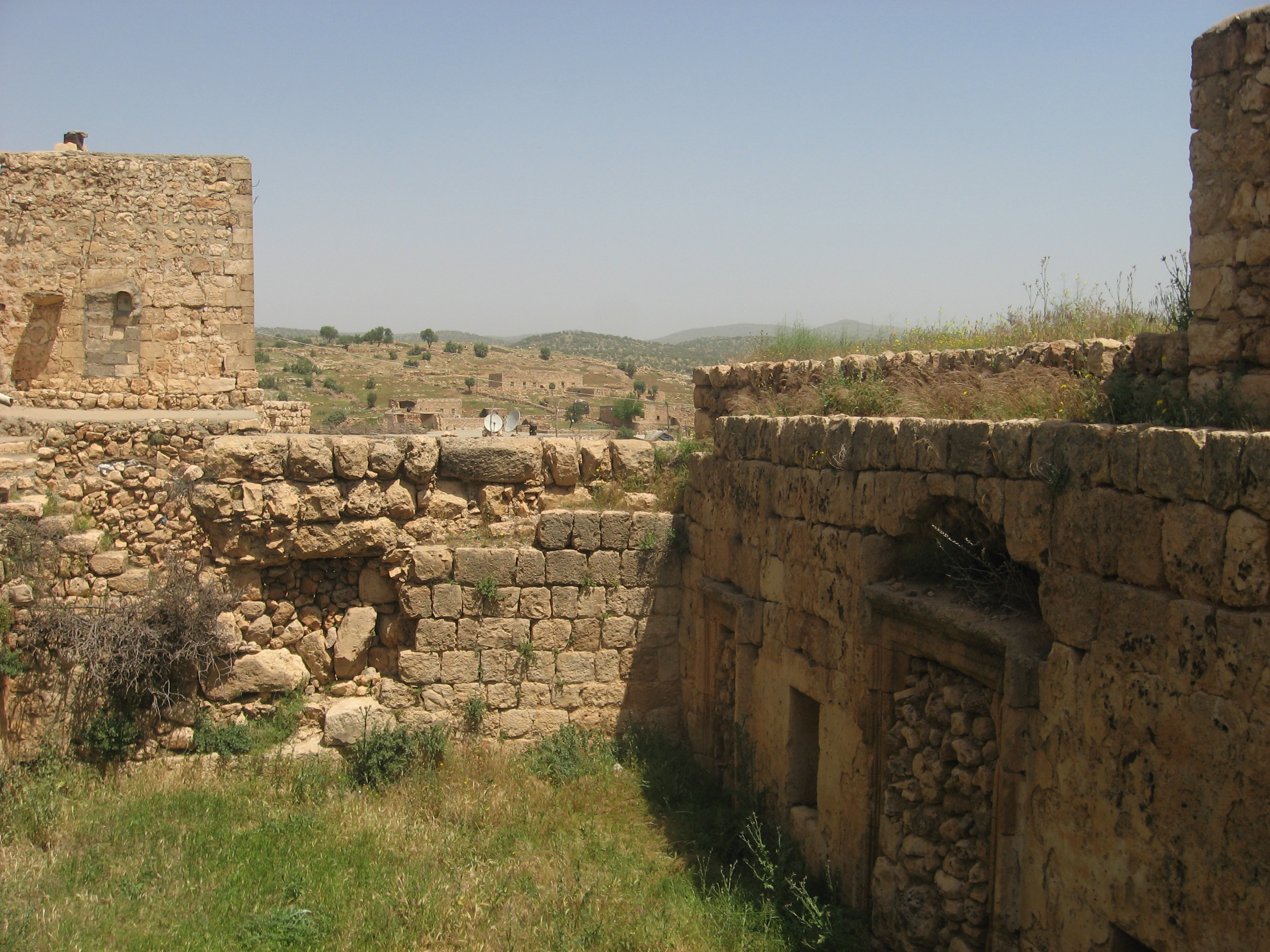

- Location within Turkey
- Coordinates: 37.537°N 41.536°E
- Country: Turkey
- Province: Batman
- District: Gercüş
- Population (2021): 272
- Time zone: UTC+3 (TRT)

Nurlu (Kurdish: Derkufan) is a village in the Gercüş District of Batman Province in Turkey. The village is populated by Kurds of the Elîkan tribe and had a population of 272 in 2021.
