= Geçitköy, Gercüş =

Village in Batman Province, Turkey

Geçitköy
- Village
- Location within Turkey
- Coordinates: 37.637°N 41.256°E
- Country: Turkey
- Province: Batman
- District: Gercüş
- Population (2021): 127
- Time zone: UTC+3 (TRT)

Geçitköy (Kurdish: Himêdîyê) is a village in the Gercüş District of Batman Province in Turkey. The village is populated by Kurds of the Hesar tribe and had a population of 127 in 2021.

The hamlet of Gökdere (Dazvan) is attached to the village.
