= Taşçı, Gercüş =

Village in Batman Province, Turkey

Taşçı
- Village
- Location within Turkey
- Coordinates: 37.574°N 41.186°E
- Country: Turkey
- Province: Batman
- District: Gercüş
- Population (2021): 51
- Time zone: UTC+3 (TRT)

Taşçı (Kurdish: Basyatê) is a village in the Gercüş District of Batman Province in Turkey. The village is populated by Kurds of the Hesar tribe and had a population of 51 in 2021.
