= Azamora =

Scientific classification
- Kingdom: Animalia
- Phylum: Arthropoda
- Class: Insecta
- Order: Lepidoptera
- Family: Pyralidae
- Subfamily: Chrysauginae
- Genus: Azamora; Walker, 1858

Synonyms
- Amblyura Lederer, 1863; Arica Walker, 1863; Thylacophora Ragonot, 1891; Torda Walker, 1863

Genus of moths

Azamora is a genus of snout moths. It was described by Francis Walker in 1858, and is known from Venezuela, Brazil, Suriname, and French Guiana.

== Species ==
- Azamora bilinealis (Amsel, 1956)
- Azamora corusca (Lederer, 1863)
- Azamora crameriana (Stoll in Cramer & Stoll, 1781)
- Azamora pelopsana (Walker, 1863)
- Azamora penicillana (Walker, 1863)
- Azamora splendens (Druce, 1895)
- Azamora tortriciformis Walker, 1858
