= Aurica =

Aurica may refer to:

== People ==
- Aurica Bărăscu (born 1974), a Romanian female Olympic gold medal winner in rowing
- Aurica Bojescu (born 1961), Ukrainian Romanian lawyer, minority rights activist and politician
- Aurica Buia (born 1970), a Romanian retired female long-distance runner
- Aurica Valeria Motogna-Beșe (born 1979), a Romanian handball player

=== Fictional characters ===
- Aurica Nestmile, a fictional character from Ar Tonelico: Melody of Elemia and Cross Edge

== Other ==
- Aurica Motors, a U.S. electric powertrains automotive company
- Aurica (supercontinent), one of several proposed supercontinents predicted to form in around 200 million years from now

== See also ==
- Phalanta aurica (P. aurica), another name for the Phalanta alcippe butterfly
- Arica (disambiguation)
- Orica
