= Orica albovirgulata =

Scientific classification
- Kingdom: Animalia
- Phylum: Arthropoda
- Class: Insecta
- Order: Coleoptera
- Suborder: Polyphaga
- Infraorder: Cucujiformia
- Family: Cerambycidae
- Subfamily: Lamiinae
- Tribe: Neopachystolini
- Genus: Orica; Pascoe, 1888
- Species: O. albovirgulata

Binomial name
- Orica albovirgulata (Fairmaire, 1888)

Species of beetle

Orica albovirgulata is a species of beetle in the family Cerambycidae, the only species in the genus Orica. It is found in Madagascar.

This species was described by Fairmaire in 1888.
