= Arıca, Gercüş =

Village in Batman Province, Turkey

Arıca
- Village
- Location within Turkey
- Coordinates: 37.509°N 41.444°E
- Country: Turkey
- Province: Batman
- District: Gercüş
- Population (2021): 344
- Time zone: UTC+3 (TRT)

Arıca (Kurdish: Kefri; (Note: Also spelt as Kafri, Kefrê, or Kefré.) Syriac: Kafro Elayto) (Note: Alternatively transliterated as Käfro ʿēläito, Kafro Eleito, Kafro Eloyto, or Kefro Elayto. Also known as Kafrah Tāğdū. Also called Upper Kafra or Upper Kafro or simply Kafra, in contrast with Lower Kafro (Kafro Tahtayo). Nisba: Käfrōyo.) is a village in the district of Gercüş, Batman Province in Turkey. It is populated by Syriacs and by Kurds of the Kercoz tribe. In 2021, the population was 344. It is located in the historic region of Tur Abdin.

In the village, there are churches of Mor Aho and Mor Dimet, Mor Ya’qub, and of Mor Barsaumo. The ruins of the Monastery of Mor Barsaumo are located nearby.

== Etymology ==
The Syriac name of the village is derived from "kefr" ("village" in Syriac).

== History ==
In 1454 (AG 1765), many men from Kafro Eloyto (today called Arıca) were suffocated to death by smoke by Turks of the clan of Hasan Beg, according to the account of the priest Addai of Basibrina in c. 1500 appended to the Chronography of Bar Hebraeus. Iyawannis Qufar, son of Benjamin of Kafra, was ordained as the Syriac Orthodox metropolitan of Gargar between 1492 and 1494. In the Syriac Orthodox patriarchal register of dues of 1870, it was recorded that the village had 59 households, who paid 186 dues, and was served by the Church of Morī Ya‘qūb Malfonō and 4 priests. It was situated in the Midyat kaza (district) of the Mardin sanjak in the Diyarbekir vilayet in c. 1900. Philoxenus Abd al-Ahad Massi, abbot and bishop of Mor Gabriel Monastery (r. 1913–1915), was from Kafro Eloyto.

In 1914, 400 Syriacs inhabited Kafro Elayto, as per the list presented to the Paris Peace Conference by the Assyro-Chaldean delegation. There were 80 Syriac families and 30 Kurdish families in 1915. The Syriacs adhered to the Syriac Orthodox Church. Amidst the Sayfo, the village was surrounded by Kurds led by Yusuf Agha, son of Hasan Shamdin, the owner of Kfar-Gawze, and the Syriacs barricaded themselves in the Church of Mor Ya’qub. As they were unprepared, the Syriacs left the church after five days upon receiving assurances from Yusuf Agha, who subsequently killed their leaders and destroyed the houses in the village.

The village was inhabited by 507 people in 1960. In 1966, there were 720 Turoyo-speaking Christians in 72 families and were served by one priest. It was entirely populated by Syriacs in 1978. By 1987, there were 25 Syriac families. There may have been Syriacs at Kafro Elayto in 1999, but there were no remaining Syriacs in the village by 2012/2013.

== Notable people ==
- Mor Julius Yeshu Cicek (1942–2005), Syriac Orthodox Archbishop of Central Europe
- Mehmet Şimşek (b. 1967), Kurdish-Turkish politician

== Bibliography ==
- Barsoum, Aphrem (2008). The History of Tur Abdin. Translated by Matti Moosa. Gorgias Press.
- Bcheiry, Iskandar (2009). The Syriac Orthodox Patriarchal Register of Dues of 1870: An Unpublished Historical Document from the Late Ottoman Period. Gorgias Press.
- Biner, Zerrin Özlem (2020). States of Dispossession: Violence and Precarious Coexistence in Southeast Turkey. University of Pennsylvania Press.
- Birol, Simon (2017). "Interpretation of the 'Sayfo' in Gallo Shabo's Poem". In David Gaunt; Naures Atto; Soner O. Barthoma (eds.). Let Them Not Return: Sayfo – The Genocide against the Assyrian, Syriac and Chaldean Christians in the Ottoman Empire (PDF). pp. 157–177.
- Courtois, Sébastien de (2004). The Forgotten Genocide: Eastern Christians, The Last Arameans. Translated by Vincent Aurora. Gorgias Press.
- Courtois, Sébastien de (2013). "Tur Abdin : Réflexions sur l'état présent descommunautés syriaques du Sud-Est de la Turquie, mémoire, exils, retours". Cahier du Gremmamo (in French). 21: 113–150.
- Gaunt, David (2006). Massacres, Resistance, Protectors: Muslim-Christian Relations in Eastern Anatolia during World War I. Gorgias Press.
- Jongerden, Joost; Verheij, Jelle, eds. (2012). Social Relations in Ottoman Diyarbekir, 1870-1915. Brill.
- Keser Kayaalp, Elif (2021). Church Architecture of Late Antique Northern Mesopotamia. Oxford University Press.
- Keser-Kayaalp, Elif, ed. (January 2022). Syriac Architectural Heritage at Risk in TurʿAbdin (PDF).
- Palmer, Andrew (1990). Monk and Mason on the Tigris Frontier: The Early History of Tur Abdin. Cambridge University Press.
- Ritter, Hellmut (1967). Turoyo: Die Volkssprache der Syrischen Christen des Tur 'Abdin (in German). Vol. 1. Franz Steiner Verlag.
- Sinclair, T.A. (1989). Eastern Turkey: An Architectural & Archaeological Survey. Vol. III. Pindar Press. ISBN 9780907132349.
- Tamcke, Martin (2012). "The Collapse of the Ottoman Empire and the 'Seyfo' against the Syrians". The Slow Disappearance of the Syriacs from Turkey and of the Grounds of the Mor Gabriel Monastery, ed. Pieter Omtzigt, Markus K. Tozman, Andrea Tyndall (PDF). LIT Verlag Münster. pp. 15–25.
- Tan, Altan (2018). Turabidin'den Berriye'ye. Aşiretler - Dinler - Diller - Kültürler (in Turkish). Pak Ajans Yayincilik Turizm Ve Diş Ticaret Limited şirketi. ISBN 9789944360944.
