= Gercüş =

Town in Batman Province, Turkey

- Municipality
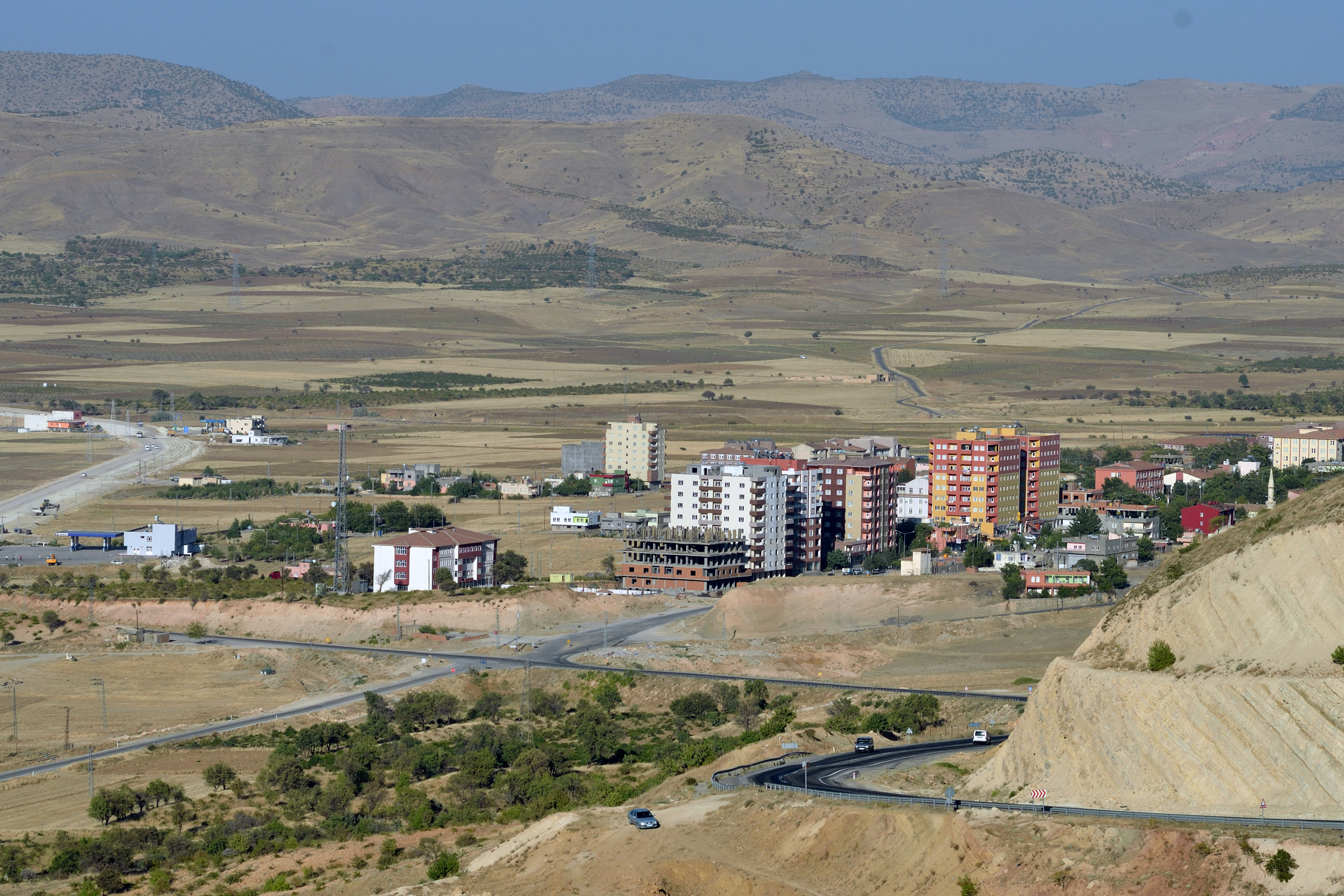

- Location within Turkey
- Coordinates: 37°33′59″N 41°23′04″E
- Country: Turkey
- Province: Batman
- Population (2021): 6,064
- Time zone: UTC+3 (TRT)
- Website: www.gercus.bel.tr

Gercüş (Kurdish: Kercoz; (Note: Also spelt as Karğūs, Kärcōs, Karjos, Kercews, Kerjoz, Kfarjos, or Gerçus. Nisba: Kärcōsī.) Syriac: Kfar-Gawze) (Note: Alternatively transliterated as Kfar Gavson, Kfar Gauson, Kfar Gawson, Kafar Gawsōn, Kafar Gawzō or Kfargusan.) is a town and seat of the Gercüş District of Batman Province in Turkey. The town is populated by Kurds of the Kercoz tribe and had a population of 6,064 in 2021. The town is divided into the neighbourhoods of Bağlarbaşı, Çukurçeşme, Pınarbaşı and Yolağzı.

== Etymology ==
The town's name in Syriac translates to "village of the walnut-tree". The Kurdish name is derived from the Kurdish word for "tell, settlement mound".

== History ==
According to the Life of Jacob of Ṣalaḥ, Kfar-Gawze (today called Gercüş) was founded by a wealthy Roman soldier named Gawson prior to Jacob's death in 421 AD. Gawson had been forced to leave Ṣalaḥ after it was discovered that his daughter had committed adultery with his servant Decius. The village is also mentioned in the Life of Theodotus of Amida (d. 698). In the Syriac Orthodox patriarchal register of dues of 1870, it was recorded that Kfar-Gawze had sixteen households, who paid twenty-nine dues, and did not have a church or priest.

In 1914, Kfar-Gawze was inhabited by 150 Syriacs, according to the list presented to the Paris Peace Conference by the Assyro-Chaldean delegation. It was located in the kaza of Midyat. It was populated by Syriac Orthodox Christians, Chaldean Catholics, and Muslims. Amidst the Sayfo, at the end of July 1915, despite initially having promised to help and protect the Syriacs, the local Kurdish agha Yusuf Hasan Shamdin took some men from Kfar-Gawze to a place called Zaghore, where they were robbed and killed, and their bodies were thrown into a river. The remaining Syriacs were made to do forced labour and many fled to Midyat. The Mhallami Şeyh Fethullah forced the release of the captive Syriac women and children.

In 1960, the population was 2354. There were 90 Kurdish-speaking Christians in twelve families at Kfar-Gawze in 1966.

== Demography ==
The following is a list of the number of Syriac families that have inhabited Kfar-Gawze per year stated. Unless otherwise stated, all figures are from the list provided in The Syrian Orthodox Christians in the Late Ottoman Period and Beyond: Crisis then Revival, as noted in the bibliography below.

- 1915: 30
- 1966: 12
- 1978: 3
- 1979: 2
- 1981: 0

== Bibliography ==
- Atto, Naures (2011). Hostages in the Homeland, Orphans in the Diaspora: Identity Discourses Among the Assyrian/Syriac Elites in the European Diaspora (PDF). Leiden University Press.
- Avcıkıran, Adem (2009). Kürtçe Anamnez Anamneza bi Kurmancî (in Turkish and Kurdish).
- Bcheiry, Iskandar (2009). The Syriac Orthodox Patriarchal Register of Dues of 1870: An Unpublished Historical Document from the Late Ottoman Period. Gorgias Press.
- Courtois, Sébastien de (2004). The Forgotten Genocide: Eastern Christians, The Last Arameans. Translated by Vincent Aurora. Gorgias Press.
- Dinno, Khalid S. (2017). The Syrian Orthodox Christians in the Late Ottoman Period and Beyond: Crisis then Revival. Gorgias Press.
- Gaunt, David (2006). Massacres, Resistance, Protectors: Muslim-Christian Relations in Eastern Anatolia during World War I. Gorgias Press.
- Hollerweger, Hans; Palmer, Andrew (1999). Turabdin: Living Cultural Heritage (in English, German, and Turkish) (2nd ed.). Friends of Tur Abdin.
- Hoyland, Robert G.; Palmer, Andrew N. (2023). The Life of Theodotus of Amida: Syriac Christianity under the Umayyad Caliphate. Gorgias Press.
- Jongerden, Joost; Verheij, Jelle, eds. (2012). Social Relations in Ottoman Diyarbekir, 1870-1915. Brill.
- Palmer, Andrew (1990). Monk and Mason on the Tigris Frontier: The Early History of Tur Abdin. Cambridge University Press.
- Radner, Karen (2006). "How to reach the Upper Tigris: The route through the Tur Abdin" (PDF). State Archives of Assyria Bulletin. 15: 273–305.
- Ritter, Hellmut (1967). Turoyo: Die Volkssprache der Syrischen Christen des Tur 'Abdin (in German). Vol. 1. Franz Steiner Verlag.
- Tan, Altan (2011). Turabidin'den Berriye'ye: Aşiretler - Dinler - Diller - Kültürler (in Turkish). Nûbihar.
- Travis, Hannibal, ed. (2018). The Assyrian Genocide: Cultural and Political Legacies (PDF). Routledge.
