= List of Yezidi settlements =

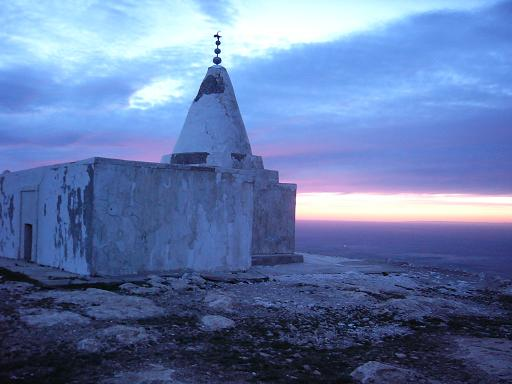
Yazidi temple (Chel Mera) in Sinjar

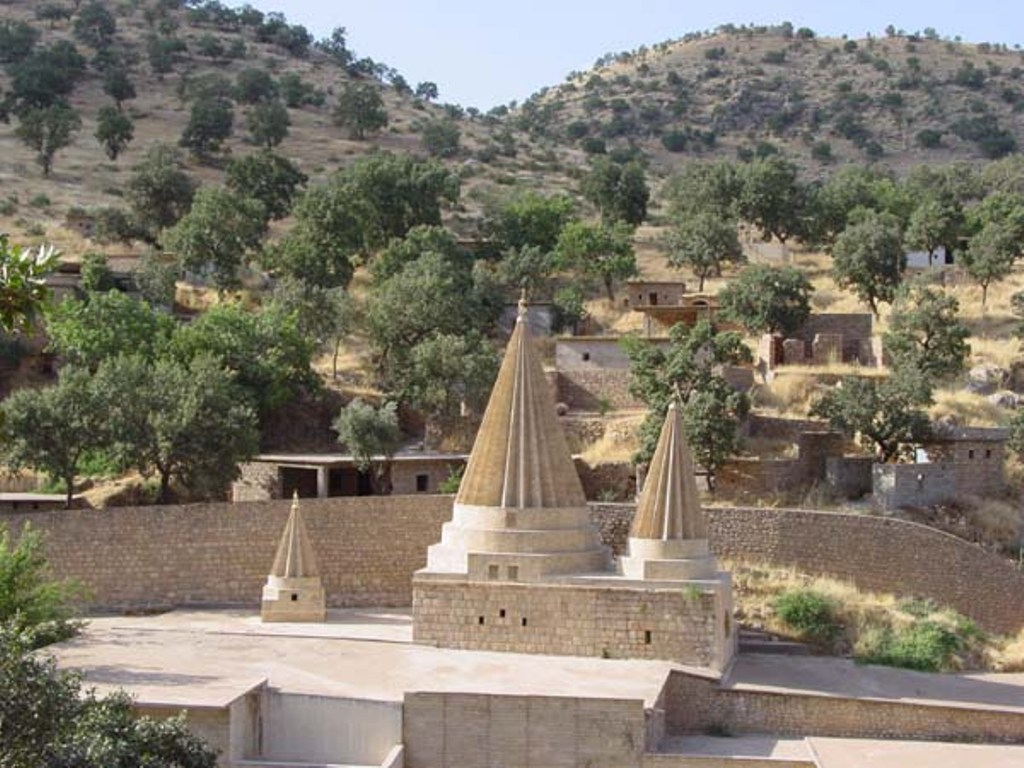
Conical roofs characteristic of Yazidi sites mark the tomb of Şêx Adî in Lalish

The following is a list of Yazidi settlements in Iraq, Syria, Turkey, and Armenia, including both current and historical Yazidi settlements. Historically, Yazidis lived primarily in Iraq, Turkey, and Syria. However, events since the end of the 20th century have resulted in considerable demographic shifts in these areas as well as mass emigration. Today, the majority of the Yazidis live in Iraq and are particularly concentrated in the Nineveh Plains and Sinjar areas in the Nineveh Governorate in northern Iraq.

== Iraq ==
The following settlements in Iraq are currently inhabited by Yazidis:

=== Duhok Governorate ===
Duhok District

- Duhok

Simele District

- Chigan
- Dayrabun
- Faysh Khabur
- Girepan (Gerepane, Gir Pahn, Girebun, Grepan)
- Gutba
- Kabartu (Kebertu, Kibrtu)
- Khanke (Khanek, Khanik, Xanke)
- Kharshina (Kharshani, Kharshnya, Khirschnia, Khurshinah, Xershenya)
- Klebadir (Galebader, Kelebadre, Qalat Bardi, Qaleba'drê)
- Mam Shivan (Mem Shivan, Mam Shuwan, Mamshivan, Mamshuwan)
- Qesr Êzdîn
- Rubaidiya (Rubaydiyah)
- Sharya (Shaira, Shaire, Shariya) (Note: Inhabitants of the villages of Dakan, Girepan (Gerepane), Khirschnia (Xershenya), Klebadir (Galebader), Scharia (Shariya), Schekh Khadir (Shexedra) and Sina (Sena) were forcibly relocated to Sharya in 1970.)
- Sheikh Xadr (Schekh Khadir, Shayk Adarah, Shekh Khdir, Shexedra)
- Simele (Simel, Semel, Semil, Sumail, Sumel)
- Sina (Sîna, Sena, Sini)
- Surka
- Zayniyat

Zakho District

- Zakho

=== Nineveh Governorate ===
Al-Hamdaniya District

- Bahzani (Behzani, Bahzan, Behzan, Behzane)
- Bashiqa (Bashiqe, Bashika, Bashiqah)

Mosul District

- Mosul
- Kanisan

Shekhan District

- Baadre (Baadra, Ba‘adra, Baadhre, Badra, Badre, Baedra, Bathra)
- Beristek (Bêristek, Berstak)
- Esiyan (Esian, Êsiya)
- Eyn Sifni (Ain Sifni, Ayn Sifni, Sheikhan)
- Gabara (Kabara)
- Jarwana
- Kendali (Kandala, Qandal)
- Mahad
- Mahmudah
- Mam Rashan
- Musakan (Mûsekan)

Sinjar District

- Adika (Adikah)
- Alidina (Aldina, Aldinah)
- Bakhalif (Bakhulayf)
- Bara (Barah)
- Barana
- Borek
- Chilmera
- Dohula
- Dugure
- Gabara (Qabara)
- Gir Zerk (Girezarka, Kuri Zarqah)
- Gohbal
- Gunde
- Halayqi (Halayqiya, Halayqiyya)
- Hardan
- Jaddala (Jidala, Jaddalah, Jidale)
- Jafri (Chafari, Jafariya, Jafriyan, Jafriyya) (Note: Inhabitants of the villages Al Khataniyah, Kar Izir (Giruzer), Qahtaniya (Qahtaniyah) and Til Ezer were forcibly relocated to Kahtaniya in 1970.)
- Karsi (Karse)
- Khana Sor (Khanasor, Khana Sur, Khanesor)
- Kocho
- Kulakan (Kulkan)
- Mamise (Mamisi)
- Markan (Mahirkan, Merkan, Mihirkan, Mirkhan)
- Maynuniyya (Majnuniya, Majnuniyya, Majnuniyah)
- Milik (Malik)
- Nakhse Awaj (Nahisat Awj)
- Qiniyeh
- Quwesa (Quwasi)
- Rubaidiya
- Sakiniyya (Sakiniya, Sukainiya, Sukayniyah, Sikeniye)
- Samuqa (Zamukhah)
- Shamika
- Siba
- Siba Sheikh Khidir (Note: Inhabitants of the villages Al Adnaniyah Jazeera and Jazirah were forcibly relocated to Siba Sheikh Khidir in 1970.)
- Sinjar
- Jazeera
- Jazirah Sinuni (Sinone, Sinune)
- Tal Banat
- Tal Qasab
- Taraf (Taraf Jundik, Teraf)
- Til Ezer (al-Qaḥṭānīya)
- Wardi (Wardiya, Wardiyya, Wardiyah)
- Yusafan (Yusufan)
- Zerwan (Zarwan, Zeravan, Zirawan)
- Zorava (Zorafa, Zarafah)

Tel Kaif District

- Babirah
- Bozan
- Beban
- Daka (Dakan, Dekan)
- Dughata (Doghati, Doghan)
- Jawhariyah (Jarahi, Jarahiya, Jarhiyah)
- Kersaf (Kar Saf)
- Khatarah (Khetara, Hatara)
- Khorzan (Khursan)
- Khoshaba
- Shêkhka
- Sreshka (Sireski, Sireshkan)
- Taftyan (Taftian, Tiftijan)
- Tel Keppe

== Turkey ==
=== Current settlements ===
Turkish name	Kurdish name	District	Tribe	Reference
Yolveren	Çineran	Batman	Reman	
Mağaraköy	Kiwex	İdil	Salihan	
Çayırlı	Kefnas	Midyat	Botikan	
Derebaşı	Koçan	Midyat	Botikan	
	Deyvanke	Midyat	Eliraşan	
Güven	Bacin	Midyat	Şemikan	
Oyuklu	Taqa	Midyat		
Yenice	Xerabya	Midyat		
Arpalı	Kûnar	Nusaybin	Dasikan	
Balaban (partially)	Birêgiriya	Nusaybin		
Çilesiz	Mezra Mihoka	Nusaybin	Dasikan	
Değirmencik	Qolika	Nusaybin	Dasikan	
Güneli	Geliyê Sora	Nusaybin	Dasikan	
Kaleli	Efşê	Nusaybin		
Kocadağ	Gelîye Pîra	Nusaybin	Dasikan	
Mağaracık	Berhok	Nusaybin	Dasikan	
Pazarköy	Bazarê	Nusaybin	Dasikan	
Sapanlı	Fisqîn	Nusaybin	Dasikan	
	Peleşo	Nusaybin	Dasikan	
	Sevlitk	Nusaybin	Dasikan	
	Şekrîn	Nusaybin	Dasikan	
Tekağaç	Mişavil	Nusaybin	Dasikan	
	Xanika Şêxa (Xenik)	Nusaybin	Dasikan	

=== Historical settlements ===
Village	District	Reference
Yoldüzü (Mirixtil)	Besni, Adıyaman	
Bahçecik	Sur, Diyarbakır	
Ataköy (Darakol)	Bismil, Diyarbakır	
Yasince (Haydarkol)	Bismil, Diyarbakır	
Gürses (Davudi)	Çınar, Diyarbakır	
Höyükdibi (Melkiş)	Çınar, Diyarbakır	
Güder (Kuştam)	Nizip, Gaziantep	
Kızılin (Zagê)	Nizip, Gaziantep	
Tatlıcak (Caxut)	Nizip, Gaziantep	
Bayraklı (Giresor)	Derik, Mardin	
Ballı (Zorava)	Derik Mardin	
Midyat	Midyat, Mardin	
Bağözü (Dirvan)	Midyat, Mardin	
Pelitli (Barbunus)	Midyat, Mardin	
Yemişli (Nehile)	Midyat, Mardin	
Dibek (Badibe)	Nusaybin, Mardin	
Güzelsu (Habap)	Nusaybin, Mardin	
Kayadibi (Memdikan)	Nusaybin, Mardin	
Yakınca (Elin)	Nusaybin, Mardin	
Yerköy (Binardkê)	Nusaybin, Mardin	
Deveboynu (Geduk)	Beşiri, Batman	
Kumgeçit (Bazivan)	Beşiri, Batman	
Kurukavak (Hamdunan)	Beşiri, Batman	
Kuşçukuru (Kelhok)	Beşiri, Batman	
Meydancık (Duşa)	Beşiri, Batman	
Oğuz (Simiz)	Beşiri, Batman	
Onbaşı (Şahsîm)	Beşiri, Batman	
Uğrak (Texerî)	Beşiri, Batman	
Uğurca (Qoruk)	Beşiri, Batman	
Üçkuyular (Fakîran)	Beşiri, Batman	
Yolkonak (Hicrê)	Beşiri, Batman	
Kılıçkaya (Divik)	Eruh, Siirt	
Altınbaşak (Îşxen)	Viranşehir, Şanlıurfa	
Ballıca (Baluca)	Viranşehir, Şanlıurfa	
Bozca (Xirbe Belek)	Viranşehir, Şanlıurfa	
Burç (Birç)	Viranşehir, Şanlıurfa	
Diktaş (Kevirbel)	Viranşehir, Şanlıurfa	
Dinçkök (Gede)	Viranşehir, Şanlıurfa	
Elgün (Atşan, Hedşan)	Viranşehir, Şanlıurfa	
Konakyeri (Tilcafer)	Viranşehir, Şanlıurfa	
Mehmetçik (Gedeosman)	Viranşehir, Şanlıurfa	
Oğlakcı (Olakci)	Viranşehir, Şanlıurfa	
Tepeyolu (Tiltirik)	Viranşehir, Şanlıurfa	
Üçgül (Minminik)	Viranşehir, Şanlıurfa	
Yaban	Viranşehir, Şanlıurfa	
Yukarıkoşanlar (Mozik)	Viranşehir, Şanlıurfa	
Yukarışölenli (Axmazût)	Viranşehir, Şanlıurfa	

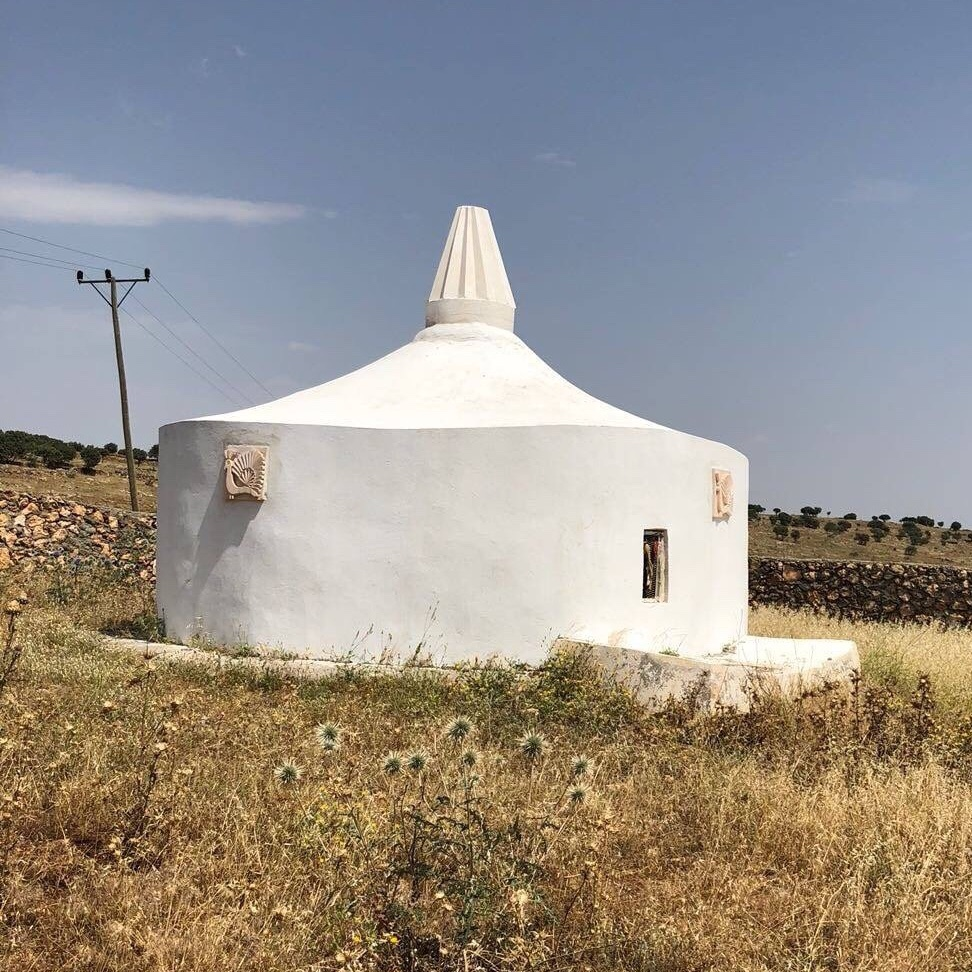
Yazidi temple in the Yazidi village Bacin (Güven) in the Midyat District of the Mardin Province in Turkey

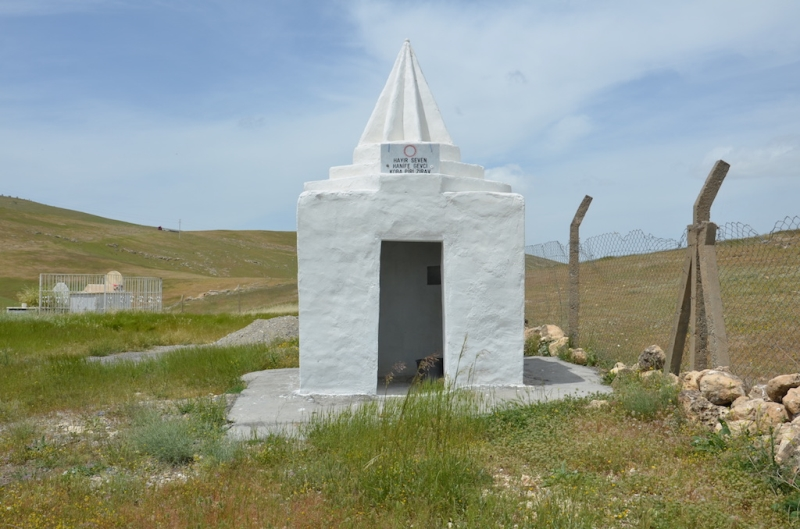
Yazidi temple in the Yazidi village Cinerya (Yolveren) in the Batman Merkez District of the Batman Province in Turkey

== Syria ==
Current Yazidi settlements in Syria
- Abu Jarade
- Alaresh
- Antariye
- Awgira
- Ain Dara
- Baflun
- Basufan
- Berzan
- Bur Said
- Chava
- Chelhumiye
- Chetele
- Derdere
- Dogerki
- Drechik
- Feqira
- Gondor
- Gumar
- Gumar Gharbi
- Hasheri
- Jdeyde
- Jidale
- Kerengo
- Khan Temir
- Khirbet Batana
- Khirbet Dilan
- Khirbet Feqira
- Khirbet Jamal
- Khirbet Khazal
- Khirbet Khidir
- Khirbet Khwe
- Kulye
- Lizga
- Mehek
- Mehmudiye
- Merekis
- Merkeb
- Mizgeft
- Morik
- Mozko
- Nasriye
- Otelja
- Qastel Jindo
- Qatma
- Qibar
- Qislachuk
- Slemaniye
- Sheikh Hmud
- Shirkan
- Shukriye
- Tell Aswad
- Tell Beydar
- Tell Eliye
- Tell Hishk
- Tell Khanzir
- Tell Khatun
- Tell Naif
- Tell Sakhar
- Tell Tawil
- Tolko
- Zeydiye

== Armenia ==
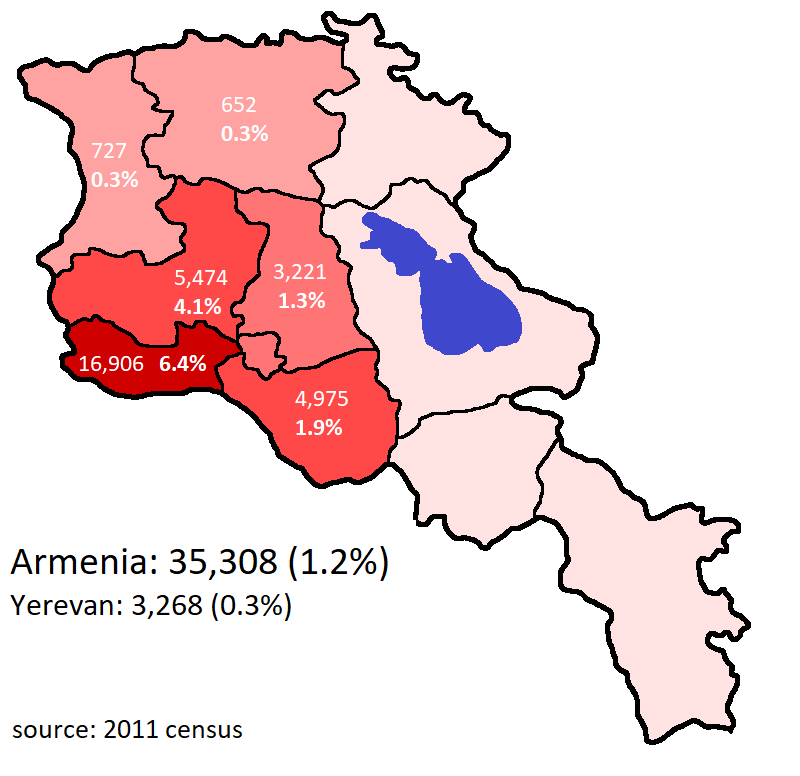
Map of Yazidis in Armenia by province (2011)

Current Yazidi settlements in Armenia
- Aknalich
- Aknashen
- Alagyaz
- Aratashen
- Arevut (Barozh)
- Arzni
- Avshen
- Balahovit
- Banavan
- Berdik
- Charchakis (Derek)
- Ddmasar (Ghapaghtapa)
- Ferik
- Getazat (Ararat marz)
- Hakko
- Hatsashen (Sabunchi)
- Jamshlu
- Jrarat
- Kanakeravan (Kotayk marz)
- Kanch (Gyalto)
- Kaniashir (Aragatsotn marz)
- Mayakovskiy
- Metsadzor (Avtola)
- Mijnatun (Ortachia)
- Mirak
- Mkhchyan
- Mrganush
- Myasnikyan (Armavir marz)
- Nor Artagers (mixed population)
- Nor Geghi
- Noramarg
- Oshakan
- Otevan
- Ranchpar
- Rya Taza
- Sadunts (Amre Taza)
- Shamiram
- Shenik
- Shenkani
- Sipan
- Sorik
- Tandzut
- Tlik
- Verin Artashat
- Yeghegnut (Badal)
- Yeraskhahun
- Zartonk (Ghamshlu)
- Zovuni

The majority of Yazidi villages are located in western Armenia, in Aragatsotn Province, Armavir Province, and Kotayk Province.

Below are towns and villages in Armenia with Yazidi population (majority and minority) organized by province, as listed in Omarkhali (2017: 35):

=== Aragatsotn Province ===
Northeastern Aragatsotn

- Sipan
- Avshen
- Ortachia
- Alagyaz
- Dzhamushlu
- Rya Taza
- Mirak
- Shenkani
- Sangyar

North-central Aragatsotn

- Aragats
- Shenavan
- Zovuni

Southeastern Aragatsotn

- Ashtarak
- Proshyan
- Ilanchalan
- Sagmosavan
- Nazyrvan
- Bazmakhpyur
- Ghazaravan

West-central Aragatsotn

- Avtona
- Dian
- Baysyz
- Aynali
- Shamiram
- Kalakut
- Verkhniy Kalakut

Southwestern Aragatsotn

- Talin
- Pirmalak
- Areg
- Kabakhtapa
- Arteni
- Gyalto
- Sabunchi
- Sorik
- Akko (Hako)
- Getap

=== Kotayk Province ===
- Dzhrarat
- Dzhraber
- Nor Gekhi
- Elar (now Abovyan)
- Nor Gyugh
- Zar
- Dzhrvezh
- Arindzh

=== Ararat Province ===
- Masis
- Mehmandar
- Getashen (Getazat)
- Artashat
- Bagramyan
- Verin Kurdkend (now Norashen)
- Ararat
- Zovuni
- Geghanist

=== Armavir Province ===
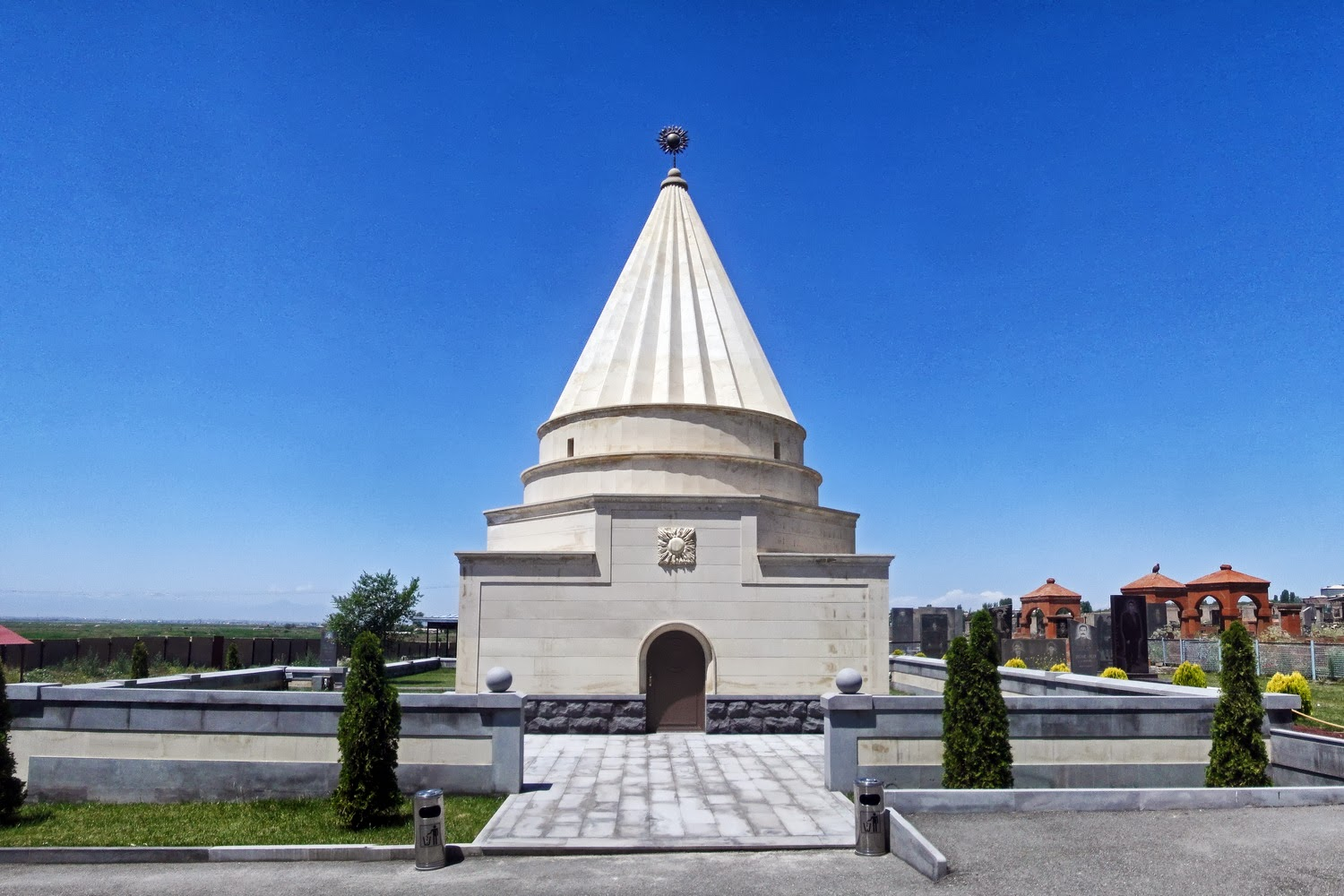
Yazidi temple in the village of Aknalich in Armenia

- Karaburun
- Lukashin
- Bambakashat
- Amasiya
- Berkashat
- Pshatavan
- Arevik
- Igdalu
- Arazap
- Badal (now Yeghegnut)
- Margara
- Nizhniy Karkhun
- Araks
- Apaga
- Arshaluys
- Samaghar
- Shahumyan
- Argavand
- Ayarlu
- Oshakan
- Aygeshat

== See also ==
- List of Yazidi holy places
- Genocide of Yazidis by ISIL
- Sinjar massacre
- Sinjar Alliance

== Bibliography ==
- Asatrian, Garnik S.; Arakelova, Victoria (2014). The Religion of the Peacock Angel: The Yezidis and Their Spirit World. ISBN 978-1317544289.
- Fuccaro, Nelida (1999). The Other Kurds: Yazidis in Colonial Iraq. London & New York: I. B. Tauris. p. 9. ISBN 1860641709.
- Furlani, Giuseppe (1937). "The Yezidi Villages in Northern Iraq". The Journal of the Royal Asiatic Society of Great Britain and Ireland. 69 (3). Cambridge University Press: 483–491. doi:10.1017/S0035869X00086056. JSTOR 25201557. S2CID 163490375.
- Hovsepyan, Roman; Stepanyan-Gandilyan, Nina; Melkumyan, Hamlet; Harutyunyan, Lili (2016). "Food as a marker for economy and part of identity: traditional vegetal food of Yezidis and Kurds in Armenia". Journal of Ethnic Foods. 3 (1): 32–41. doi:10.1016/j.jef.2016.01.003. ISSN 2352-6181.
- Maisel, Sebastian (2014). Yezidis in Syria: Identity Building among a Double Minority. Lexington Books. p. 19. ISBN 9780739177754.
- Oehring, Otmar (2017). Christians and Yazidis in Iraq: Current Situation and Prospects. Konrad Adenauer Foundation.
- Omarkhali, Khanna (2017). The Yezidi religious textual tradition, from oral to written: categories, transmission, scripturalisation, and canonisation of the Yezidi oral religious texts. Wiesbaden: Harrassowitz Verlag. ISBN 978-3-447-10856-0. OCLC 994778968.
