= Agdzhakishlag (disambiguation) =

Agdzhakishlag and Aghjaghshlagh may refer to:

- Agdzhakishlag, Armenia
- Getapnya, Armenia
- Getazat, Armenia
