= Getapnia =

Getapnia may refer to:

- Geghanist (disambiguation), several places in Armenia
- Getapnya, Armenia
