= Gekhanist =

Gekhanist may refer to:

- Geghanist (disambiguation), several places in Armenia
- Geghadir, Shirak, Armenia
