= Dağyolu =

Dağyolu can refer to:

- Dağyolu, Beşiri
- Dağyolu, Mudurnu
- Dağyolu, Narman
- the Turkish name for Fotta
