= Yeşiloba =

Yeşiloba (literally "green nomad encampment" in Turkish) may refer to the following places in Turkey:

- Yeşiloba, Bekilli, a village in the district of Bekilli, Denizli Province, also known as Medele
- Yeşiloba, Beşiri, a village in the district of Beşiri, Batman Province
- Yeşiloba, Korkuteli, a village in the district of Korkuteli, Antalya Province
