= Yalınca =

Yalınca can refer to:

- Yalınca, Beşiri
- Yalınca, Erzincan
