= Argavand =

Argavand may refer to:

- Argavand, Ararat, Armenia
- Argavand, Armavir, Armenia
