= Emma of Ghazaravan =

- Born: Եղիսաբեթը; 1960; Abkhazia
- Occupation: Christian nun
- Position held: superior (2022–)

Emma of Ghazaravan (in Armenian: Էմման Ղազարավանից, Emma Ghazaravanits), born in Abkhazia in 1960, also known as Elizabeth of Ghazaravan, is an Armenian nun and hegumen. She is in charge of the Saint Lazarus Monastery in Ghazaravan.

Since September 2022, she has been the mother superior of all nuns within the Armenian Apostolic Church.

== Biography ==
She was born in Abkhazia in 1960 with the birth name "Elizabeth". She was an avid swimmer and runner before joining the religious orders. She embraced monastic life at the age of 41, in 2001.

Later, together with other nuns, she founded the Saint Lazarus Monastery in Ghazaravan, the eponymous town. It is the only active monastery in post-communist Armenia. In September 2022, she was enthroned as the mother superior of all nuns in the Armenian Apostolic Church during a ceremony held at the Etchmiadzin Cathedral.
