= Beyçayırı =

Beyçayırı can refer to:

- Beyçayırı, Beşiri
- Beyçayırı, Lapseki
