= Güvercinlik =

Güvercinlik can refer to:

- Güvercinlik, Beşiri
- Güvercinlik, Osmancık
- Güvercinlik, Sason
- the Turkish name for Acheritou
