= Çakıllı (disambiguation) =

Çakıllı can refer to:

- Çakıllı
- Çakıllı, Beşiri
- Çakıllı, Bismil
- Çakıllı, Kastamonu
- Çakıllı, Sındırgı
