= Beşpınar, Beşiri =

Village in Batman Province, Turkey

Beşpınar
- Village
- Location within Turkey
- Coordinates: 37.845°N 41.606°E
- Country: Turkey
- Province: Batman
- District: Beşiri
- Population (2021): 1,756
- Time zone: UTC+3 (TRT)

Beşpınar (Kurdish: Aranz; Syriac: Arnez) is a village in the Beşiri District of Batman Province in Turkey. The village is populated by Kurds and had a population of 1,756 in 2021. The village is Yazidi.

The hamlets of Doruklu and Sütlüce are attached to the village. Doruklu (Kanî Sork, Koniserik) is also populated by Yazidis.

== History ==
‘Arnez (today called Beşpınar) was historically inhabited by Syriac Orthodox Christians. In the Syriac Orthodox patriarchal register of dues of 1870, it was recorded that the village had 10 households, who paid 16 dues, and did not have a priest. There was a Syriac Orthodox church of Morī Gewargīs. It was located in the kaza (district) of Şirvan.

== Bibliography ==
- Bcheiry, Iskandar (2009). The Syriac Orthodox Patriarchal Register of Dues of 1870: An Unpublished Historical Document from the Late Ottoman Period. Gorgias Press.
- Turan, Ahmet (1993). Yezidiler Tarihçeleri Coğrafi Dağılımları İnançları Örf ve Adetleri (in Turkish).
