= Durucak, Beşiri =

Village in Batman Province, Turkey

Durucak
- Village
- Location within Turkey
- Coordinates: 38.001°N 41.357°E
- Country: Turkey
- Province: Batman
- District: Beşiri
- Population (2021): 793
- Time zone: UTC+3 (TRT)

Durucak (Kurdish: Bimêrê) is a village in the Beşiri District of Batman Province in Turkey. The village is populated by Kurds of the Reşkotan tribe and had a population of 793 in 2021.

The hamlets of Çaykenarı, İslamköy and Ürünlü are attached to the village.
