= Örmegöze, Beşiri =

Village in Batman Province, Turkey

Örmegöze
- Village
- Location within Turkey
- Coordinates: 37.908°N 41.240°E
- Country: Turkey
- Province: Batman
- District: Beşiri
- Population (2021): 309
- Time zone: UTC+3 (TRT)

Örmegöze (Kurdish: Beharzik; Syriac: Bāḥezraq) (Note: Also known as Baharsah, Baharzik, Baharzık, or Bahurzuk.) is a village in the Beşiri District of Batman Province in Turkey. The village is populated by Kurds of the Sinikan tribe and had a population of 309 in 2021.

The hamlet of Ağılcık is attached to the village.

== History ==
Bāḥezraq (today called Örmegöze) was historically inhabited by Syriac Orthodox Christians, Kurdish-speaking Armenians, and adherents of the Church of the East. In the Syriac Orthodox patriarchal register of dues of 1870, it was recorded that the village had 8 households, who paid 9 dues, and did not have a church or a priest. The Armenians were attacked by the Belek, Bekran, Şegro, and other Kurdish tribes in May 1915 amidst the Armenian genocide.

== Bibliography ==
- Bcheiry, Iskandar (2009). The Syriac Orthodox Patriarchal Register of Dues of 1870: An Unpublished Historical Document from the Late Ottoman Period. Gorgias Press.
- Jongerden, Joost; Verheij, Jelle, eds. (2012). Social Relations in Ottoman Diyarbekir, 1870-1915. Brill.
- Kévorkian, Raymond (2011). The Armenian Genocide: A Complete History. I.B. Tauris.
