= Yalınkavak, Beşiri =

Village in Batman Province, Turkey

Yalınkavak
- Village
- Location within Turkey
- Coordinates: 37.853°N 41.366°E
- Country: Turkey
- Province: Batman
- District: Beşiri
- Population (2021): 244
- Time zone: UTC+3 (TRT)

Yalınkavak (Kurdish: Baximsê; Syriac: Bāḫemes) is a village in the Beşiri District of Batman Province in Turkey. The village is populated by Kurds of the Elîkan tribe and had a population of 244 in 2021.

== History ==
Bāḫemes (today called Yalınkavak) was historically inhabited by Syriac Orthodox Christians. In the Syriac Orthodox patriarchal register of dues of 1870, it was recorded that the village had 8 households, who paid 56 dues, and did not have a church or a priest.

== Bibliography ==
- Bcheiry, Iskandar (2009). The Syriac Orthodox Patriarchal Register of Dues of 1870: An Unpublished Historical Document from the Late Ottoman Period. Gorgias Press.
