= Doğankavak, Beşiri =

Village in Batman Province, Turkey

Doğankavak
- Village
- Location within Turkey
- Coordinates: 37.962°N 41.226°E
- Country: Turkey
- Province: Batman
- District: Beşiri
- Population (2021): 1,471
- Time zone: UTC+3 (TRT)

Doğankavak (Kurdish: Hethetkê) is a village in the Beşiri District of Batman Province in Turkey. The village is populated by Kurds of the Reşkotan tribe and had a population of 1,471 in 2021.
