= İkiköprü, Beşiri =

Town in Batman Province, Turkey

İkiköprü
- Municipality
- Location in Turkey
- Coordinates: 37.966°N 41.335°E
- Country: Turkey
- Province: Batman
- District: Beşiri
- Population (2021): 3,455
- Time zone: UTC+3 (TRT)

İkiköprü (Kurdish: Aviskê, Armenian: Ավիսկ, romanized: Avisk) is a town (belde) in the Beşiri District of Batman Province in Turkey. The town is populated by Kurds of the Reşkotan tribe and had a population of 3,455 in 2021. It is populated by both Muslims and Yazidis.

The town is divided into the neighborhoods of Karaduman, Kıyanç and Turgut Özal.
