= Işıkveren, Beşiri =

Village in Batman Province, Turkey

Işıkveren
- Village
- Location within Turkey
- Coordinates: 37.874°N 41.441°E
- Country: Turkey
- Province: Batman
- District: Beşiri
- Population (2021): 117
- Time zone: UTC+3 (TRT)

Işıkveren (Kurdish: Dusakdik; Syriac: Sa'dikī) is a village in the Beşiri District of Batman Province in Turkey. The village is populated by Kurds of the Elîkan tribe and had a population of 117 in 2021.

The hamlets of Demirdöven and Pompalı are attached to the village.

== History ==
Sa'dikī (today called Işıkveren) was historically inhabited by Syriac Orthodox Christians. In the Syriac Orthodox patriarchal register of dues of 1870, it was recorded that the village had 1 household, who paid 12 dues, and did not have a church or a priest.

== Bibliography ==
- Bcheiry, Iskandar (2009). The Syriac Orthodox Patriarchal Register of Dues of 1870: An Unpublished Historical Document from the Late Ottoman Period. Gorgias Press.
