= Geghanist =

Geghanist may refer to:

- Geghanist, Ararat, Armenia
- Geghanist, Shirak, Armenia
