= Yenipınar, Beşiri =

Village in Batman Province, Turkey

Yenipınar
- Village
- Location within Turkey
- Coordinates: 37.843°N 41.301°E
- Country: Turkey
- Province: Batman
- District: Beşiri
- Population (2021): 1,199
- Time zone: UTC+3 (TRT)

Yenipınar (Kurdish: Keferza Jêr; Syriac: Kafarzū) (Note: Also known as Aşağıkeferzo, Gavazu Aşağı, Kafarzo-Sufla, Kaferzo, Kafèrzo, or Kefrzo.) is a village in the Beşiri District of Batman Province in Turkey. The village is populated by Kurds of the Reman tribe and had a population of 1,199 in 2021.

== History ==
Kafarzū (today called Yenipınar) was historically inhabited by Kurdish-speaking Syriac Orthodox Christians and Armenians. In the Syriac Orthodox patriarchal register of dues of 1870, it was recorded that the village had 48 households, who paid 215 dues, and had 2 priests. There was a Syriac Orthodox church of Yūldaṯ Alohō. There were 18 Armenian hearths in 1880. (Note: Kévorkian does not distinguish between Aşağıkeferzo (Yenipınar) and Yukarıkeferzo (Yarımtaş).) It was located in the Beşiri kaza in the Diyarbakır sanjak in the Diyarbekir vilayet in c. 1900. It was populated by 700 Syriacs in 1914, according to the list presented to the Paris Peace Conference by the Assyro-Chaldean delegation. The Armenians were attacked by the Belek, Bekran, Şegro, and other Kurdish tribes in May 1915 amidst the Armenian genocide.

== Bibliography ==
- Bcheiry, Iskandar (2009). The Syriac Orthodox Patriarchal Register of Dues of 1870: An Unpublished Historical Document from the Late Ottoman Period. Gorgias Press.
- Gaunt, David (2006). Massacres, Resistance, Protectors: Muslim-Christian Relations in Eastern Anatolia during World War I. Gorgias Press.
- Jongerden, Joost; Verheij, Jelle, eds. (2012). Social Relations in Ottoman Diyarbekir, 1870-1915. Brill.
- Kévorkian, Raymond H. (2006). "Demographic Changes in the Armenian Population of Diarbekir, 1895-1914". In Richard G. Hovannisian (ed.). Armenian Tigranakert/Diarbekir and Edessa/Urfa. Mazda Publishers. pp. 250–284.
- Kévorkian, Raymond (2011). The Armenian Genocide: A Complete History. I.B. Tauris.
- Tan, Altan (2018). Turabidin'den Berriye'ye. Aşiretler - Dinler - Diller - Kültürler (in Turkish). ISBN 9789944360944.
