= İkiyaka, Beşiri =

Village in Batman Province, Turkey

İkiyaka
- Village
- Location within Turkey
- Coordinates: 37.766°N 41.545°E
- Country: Turkey
- Province: Batman
- District: Beşiri
- Population (2021): 50
- Time zone: UTC+3 (TRT)

İkiyaka (Kurdish: Sulanê) is a village in the Beşiri District of Batman Province in Turkey. The village is populated by Kurds of the Derhawî tribe and had a population of 50 in 2021.

The hamlets of Tanrıverdi and Yumrukaya are attached to the village.
