= Dayılar, Beşiri =

Village in Batman Province, Turkey

Dayılar
- Village
- Location within Turkey
- Coordinates: 38.046°N 41.322°E
- Country: Turkey
- Province: Batman
- District: Beşiri
- Population (2021): 286
- Time zone: UTC+3 (TRT)

Dayılar (Kurdish: Alaf) is a village in the Beşiri District of Batman Province in Turkey. The village is populated by Kurds of the Reşkotan tribe and had a population of 286 in 2021.
