= Çavuşbayırı, Beşiri =

Village in Batman Province, Turkey

Çavuşbayırı
- Village
- Location within Turkey
- Coordinates: 37.774°N 41.612°E
- Country: Turkey
- Province: Batman
- District: Beşiri
- Population (2021): 25
- Time zone: UTC+3 (TRT)

Çavuşbayırı (Kurdish: Halawî) is a village in the Beşiri District of Batman Province in Turkey. The village had a population of 25 in 2021.
