= Otluca, Beşiri =

Village in Batman Province, Turkey

Otluca
- Village
- Location within Turkey
- Coordinates: 38.019°N 41.250°E
- Country: Turkey
- Province: Batman
- District: Beşiri
- Population (2021): 267
- Time zone: UTC+3 (TRT)

Otluca (Kurdish: Mêrga recal) is a village in the Beşiri District of Batman Province in Turkey. The village is populated by Kurds of the Reşkotan tribe and had a population of 267 in 2021.
