= Kaşüstü, Beşiri =

Village in Batman Province, Turkey

Kaşüstü
- Village
- Location within Turkey
- Coordinates: 37.768°N 41.656°E
- Country: Turkey
- Province: Batman
- District: Beşiri
- Population (2021): 38
- Time zone: UTC+3 (TRT)

Kaşüstü (Kurdish: Xandukê) is a village in the Beşiri District of Batman Province in Turkey. The village is populated by Kurds of the Derhawî tribe and had a population of 38 in 2021.

The hamlets of Danacı (Mîlîka) and Ulular are attached to the village.
