= Bahçeli, Beşiri =

Village in Batman Province, Turkey

Bahçeli
- Village
- Location within Turkey
- Coordinates: 38.033°N 41.382°E
- Country: Turkey
- Province: Batman
- District: Beşiri
- Population (2021): 530
- Time zone: UTC+3 (TRT)

Bahçeli (Kurdish: Barinc) is a village in the Beşiri District of Batman Province in Turkey. The village is populated by Kurds of the Reşkotan tribe and had a population of 530 in 2021.

The hamlets of Kapaklı and Yazyurdu are attached to the village.
