= Asmadere, Beşiri =

Village in Batman Province, Turkey

Asmadere
- Village
- Location within Turkey
- Coordinates: 37.911°N 41.367°E
- Country: Turkey
- Province: Batman
- District: Beşiri
- Population (2021): 517
- Time zone: UTC+3 (TRT)

Asmadere (Kurdish: Hope; Syriac: Al-Hūb) is a village in the Beşiri District of Batman Province in Turkey. The village is populated by Kurds of the Elîkan tribe and had a population of 517 in 2021.

== History ==
Al-Hūb (today called Asmadere) was historically inhabited by Syriac Orthodox Christians. In the Syriac Orthodox patriarchal register of dues of 1870, it was recorded that the village had 11 households, who paid 32 dues, and did not have a church or a priest.

== Bibliography ==
- Bcheiry, Iskandar (2009). The Syriac Orthodox Patriarchal Register of Dues of 1870: An Unpublished Historical Document from the Late Ottoman Period. Gorgias Press.
- Bcheiry, Iskandar (2019). "Digitizing and Schematizing the Archival Material from the Late Ottoman Period Found in the Monastery of al-Zaʿfarān in Southeast Turkey". Atla Summary of Proceedings. 72 (January): 50–61. doi:10.31046/proceedings.2018.113.
