= Tepecik, Beşiri =

Village in Batman Province, Turkey

Tepecik
- Village
- Location within Turkey
- Coordinates: 37.880°N 41.401°E
- Country: Turkey
- Province: Batman
- District: Beşiri
- Population (2021): 143
- Time zone: UTC+3 (TRT)

Tepecik (Syriac: ʿAyn Karmū) is a village in the Beşiri District of Batman Province in Turkey. The village had a population of 143 in 2021.

== History ==
ʿAyn Karmū (today called Tepecik) was historically inhabited by Syriac Orthodox Christians. In the Syriac Orthodox patriarchal register of dues of 1870, it was recorded that the village had 5 households, who paid 47 dues, and was served by one priest, but did not have a church.

== Bibliography ==
- Bcheiry, Iskandar (2009). The Syriac Orthodox Patriarchal Register of Dues of 1870: An Unpublished Historical Document from the Late Ottoman Period. Gorgias Press.
