= Bilek, Beşiri =

Village in Batman Province, Turkey

Bilek
- Village
- Location within Turkey
- Coordinates: 37.988°N 41.260°E
- Country: Turkey
- Province: Batman
- District: Beşiri
- Population (2021): 327
- Time zone: UTC+3 (TRT)

Bilek (Kurdish: Bolind) is a village in the Beşiri District of Batman Province in Turkey. The village is populated by Kurds of the Reşkotan tribe and had a population of 327 in 2021.

The hamlet of Remikan is attached to the village.
