= Karatepe, Beşiri =

Village in Batman Province, Turkey

Karatepe
- Village
- Location within Turkey
- Coordinates: 37.919°N 41.229°E
- Country: Turkey
- Province: Batman
- District: Beşiri
- Population (2021): 82
- Time zone: UTC+3 (TRT)

Karatepe is a village in the Beşiri District of Batman Province in Turkey. The village had a population of 82 in 2021.
