= Çığırlı, Beşiri =

Village in Batman Province, Turkey

Çığırlı
- Village
- Location within Turkey
- Coordinates: 37.832°N 41.354°E
- Country: Turkey
- Province: Batman
- District: Beşiri
- Population (2021): 129
- Time zone: UTC+3 (TRT)

Çığırlı (Kurdish: Dêrike) is a village in the Beşiri District of Batman Province in Turkey. The village had a population of 129 in 2021.
