= Kütüklü, Beşiri =

Village in Batman Province, Turkey

Kütüklü
- Village
- Location within Turkey
- Coordinates: 37.856°N 41.487°E
- Country: Turkey
- Province: Batman
- District: Beşiri
- Population (2021): 194
- Time zone: UTC+3 (TRT)

Kütüklü (Kurdish: Gire Çelo) is a village in the Beşiri District of Batman Province in Turkey. The village is populated by Kurds of the Elîkan tribe and had a population of 194 in 2021.

The hamlet of Kumrulu is attached to the village.
