= Başarı, Beşiri =

Başarı
- Village
- Location within Turkey
- Coordinates: 37°46′44″N 41°34′18″E
- Country: Turkey
- Province: Batman
- District: Beşiri
- Population (2021): 28
- Time zone: UTC+3 (TRT)

Başarı (Kurdish: Ridwan) is a village in the Beşiri District, Batman Province, Turkey. The village is populated by Kurds of non-tribal affiliation and had a population of 28 in 2021.
