= Yontukyazı, Beşiri =

Village in Batman Province, Turkey

Yontukyazı
- Village
- Location within Turkey
- Coordinates: 37.883°N 41.329°E
- Country: Turkey
- Province: Batman
- District: Beşiri
- Population (2021): 631
- Time zone: UTC+3 (TRT)

Yontukyazı (Kurdish: Cinesker; Syriac: Ğanaskar) (Note: Also known as Canasker, Cinasker, Djenasgir, Djenazgar, Genesfer, Jenasgir, or Jenazgar.) is a village in the Beşiri District of Batman Province in Turkey. The village is populated by Kurds of the Elîkan tribe and had a population of 631 in 2021.

== History ==
Ğanaskar (today called Yontukyazı) was historically inhabited by Syriac Orthodox Christians and Kurdish-speaking Armenians. In the Syriac Orthodox patriarchal register of dues of 1870, it was recorded that the village had 29 households, who paid 146 dues, and had one priest, but did not have a church. There were 10 Armenian hearths in 1880. In 1914, it was populated by 320 Syriacs, according to the list presented to the Paris Peace Conference by the Assyro-Chaldean delegation. The Armenians were attacked by the Belek, Bekran, Şegro, and other Kurdish tribes in May 1915 amidst the Armenian genocide.

== Bibliography ==
- Bcheiry, Iskandar (2009). The Syriac Orthodox Patriarchal Register of Dues of 1870: An Unpublished Historical Document from the Late Ottoman Period. Gorgias Press.
- Gaunt, David (2006). Massacres, Resistance, Protectors: Muslim-Christian Relations in Eastern Anatolia during World War I. Gorgias Press.
- Jongerden, Joost; Verheij, Jelle, eds. (2012). Social Relations in Ottoman Diyarbekir, 1870-1915. Brill.
- Kévorkian, Raymond H. (2006). "Demographic Changes in the Armenian Population of Diarbekir, 1895-1914". In Richard G. Hovannisian (ed.). Armenian Tigranakert/Diarbekir and Edessa/Urfa. Mazda Publishers.
- Kévorkian, Raymond (2011). The Armenian Genocide: A Complete History. I.B. Tauris.
