= Atbağı, Beşiri =

Village in Batman Province, Turkey

Atbağı
- Village
- Location within Turkey
- Coordinates: 37.836°N 41.342°E
- Country: Turkey
- Province: Batman
- District: Beşiri
- Population (2021): 146
- Time zone: UTC+3 (TRT)

Atbağı (Kurdish: Bazbutê; Syriac: Bāzbūt) (Note: Alternatively transliterated as Bazbout, Bazburt, or Bazbut.) is a village in the Beşiri District of Batman Province in Turkey. The village is populated by Kurds of the Reman tribe and had a population of 146 in 2021.

== History ==
Bāzbūt (today called Atbağı) was historically inhabited by Syriac Orthodox Christians and Kurdish-speaking Armenians. In the Syriac Orthodox patriarchal register of dues of 1870, it was recorded that the village had 8 households, who paid 3 dues, and did not have a church or a priest. There were 6 Armenian hearths in 1880. It was located in the district of Beşiri. The Armenians were attacked by the Belek, Bekran, Şegro, and other Kurdish tribes in May 1915 amidst the Armenian genocide.

== Bibliography ==
- Bcheiry, Iskandar (2009). The Syriac Orthodox Patriarchal Register of Dues of 1870: An Unpublished Historical Document from the Late Ottoman Period. Gorgias Press.
- Jongerden, Joost; Verheij, Jelle, eds. (2012). Social Relations in Ottoman Diyarbekir, 1870-1915. Brill.
- Kévorkian, Raymond H. (2006). "Demographic Changes in the Armenian Population of Diarbekir, 1895-1914". In Richard G. Hovannisian (ed.). Armenian Tigranakert/Diarbekir and Edessa/Urfa. Mazda Publishers. pp. 250–284.
- Kévorkian, Raymond (2011). The Armenian Genocide: A Complete History. I.B. Tauris.
- Tan, Altan (2018). Turabidin'den Berriye'ye. Aşiretler - Dinler - Diller - Kültürler (in Turkish). ISBN 9789944360944.
