= Değirmenüstü, Beşiri =

Village in Batman Province, Turkey

Değirmenüstü
- Village
- Location within Turkey
- Coordinates: 37.866°N 41.343°E
- Country: Turkey
- Province: Batman
- District: Beşiri
- Population (2021): 358
- Time zone: UTC+3 (TRT)

Değirmenüstü (Kurdish: Azika Jor; Syriac: Azkī) (Note: Also known as Azek, Azig-Verin, Azig-Vérin, Azik-Youkari, Değimenüstü, Yukarıazik, or Yukarıazzik.) is a village in the Beşiri District of Batman Province in Turkey. The village is populated by Kurds of the Reman tribe and had a population of 358 in 2021.

== History ==
Azkī (today called Değirmenüstü) was historically inhabited by Kurdish-speaking Syriac Orthodox Christians, Armenians, and Church of the East Christians. In the Syriac Orthodox patriarchal register of dues of 1870, it was recorded that the village had 7 households, who paid 45 dues, and did not have a church or a priest. There were 5 Armenian hearths in 1880. It was located in the Beşiri kaza in the Diyarbakır sanjak in the Diyarbekir vilayet in c. 1900. It was populated by 100 Syriacs in 1914, according to the list presented to the Paris Peace Conference by the Assyro-Chaldean delegation. (Note: The list presented to the Paris Peace Conference by the Assyro-Chaldean delegation does not distinguish between Aşağıazik (Samanlı) and Yukarıazik (Değirmenüstü).) The Armenians were attacked by the Belek, Bekran, Şegro, and other Kurdish tribes in May 1915 amidst the Armenian genocide.

== Bibliography ==
- Bcheiry, Iskandar (2009). The Syriac Orthodox Patriarchal Register of Dues of 1870: An Unpublished Historical Document from the Late Ottoman Period. Gorgias Press.
- Gaunt, David (2006). Massacres, Resistance, Protectors: Muslim-Christian Relations in Eastern Anatolia during World War I. Gorgias Press.
- Jongerden, Joost; Verheij, Jelle, eds. (2012). Social Relations in Ottoman Diyarbekir, 1870-1915. Brill.
- Kévorkian, Raymond H. (2006). "Demographic Changes in the Armenian Population of Diarbekir, 1895-1914". In Richard G. Hovannisian (ed.). Armenian Tigranakert/Diarbekir and Edessa/Urfa. Mazda Publishers. pp. 250–284.
- Kévorkian, Raymond (2011). The Armenian Genocide: A Complete History. I.B. Tauris.
