= Tekağaç, Beşiri =

Village in Batman Province, Turkey

Tekağaç
- Village
- Location within Turkey
- Coordinates: 37.996°N 41.407°E
- Country: Turkey
- Province: Batman
- District: Beşiri
- Population (2021): 357
- Time zone: UTC+3 (TRT)

Tekağaç (Kurdish: Gundikê Dono) is a village in the Beşiri District of Batman Province in Turkey. The village had a population of 357 in 2021.
