= Yeniyol, Beşiri =

Village in Batman Province, Turkey

Yeniyol
- Village
- Location within Turkey
- Coordinates: 37.957°N 41.308°E
- Country: Turkey
- Province: Batman
- District: Beşiri
- Population (2021): 130
- Time zone: UTC+3 (TRT)

Yeniyol (Kurdish: Kurtikê) is a village in the Beşiri District of Batman Province in Turkey. The village is populated by Kurds of the Reşkotan tribe and had a population of 130 in 2021.
