= Meydancık, Beşiri =

Village in Batman Province, Turkey

Meydancık
- Settlement
- Location in Turkey
- Coordinates: 37.81249°N 41.50361°E
- Country: Turkey
- Province: Batman
- District: Beşiri
- Time zone: UTC+3 (TRT)

Meydancık (Syriac: Dūšā) is a hamlet in the Beşiri District of Batman Province in Turkey. It is attached to the village of Kumgeçit. It is populated by Yazidis.

== History ==
Dūšā (today called Meydancık) was historically inhabited by Syriac Orthodox Christians. In the Syriac Orthodox patriarchal register of dues of 1870, it was recorded that the village had 4 households, who paid 21 dues, and did not have a church or a priest.

== Bibliography ==
- Bcheiry, Iskandar (2009). The Syriac Orthodox Patriarchal Register of Dues of 1870: An Unpublished Historical Document from the Late Ottoman Period. Gorgias Press.
- Turan, Ahmet (1993). Yezidiler Tarihçeleri Coğrafi Dağılımları İnançları Örf ve Adetleri (in Turkish).
