= Yakacık, Beşiri =

Village in Batman Province, Turkey

Yakacık
- Village
- Location within Turkey
- Coordinates: 37.863°N 41.421°E
- Country: Turkey
- Province: Batman
- District: Beşiri
- Population (2021): 62
- Time zone: UTC+3 (TRT)

Yakacık (Kurdish: Meza reş; Syriac: Mazrehreš) (Note: Also known as Meghravach, Meghravash, Mezaraş, or Mirza Beg.) is a village in the Beşiri District of Batman Province in Turkey. The village is populated by Kurds of the Elîkan tribe and had a population of 62 in 2021.

== History ==
Mazrehreš (today called Yakacık) was historically inhabited by Syriac Orthodox Christians and Kurdish-speaking Armenians. In the Syriac Orthodox patriarchal register of dues of 1870, it was recorded that the village had 3 households, who paid 22 dues, and did not have a priest. There was a church of Yūldaṯ Alohō. There were 20 Armenian hearths and an Armenian church in 1880. It was located in the district of Beşiri. The Armenians were attacked by the Belek, Bekran, Şegro, and other Kurdish tribes in May 1915 amidst the Armenian genocide.

== Bibliography ==
- Bcheiry, Iskandar (2009). The Syriac Orthodox Patriarchal Register of Dues of 1870: An Unpublished Historical Document from the Late Ottoman Period. Gorgias Press.
- Cibo, Nezire (2016). Kürt tarihinde Garzan ve Pencinariler (1st ed.). İsmail Beşikci Vakfı Yayınları. ISBN 9786059073219.
- Jongerden, Joost; Verheij, Jelle, eds. (2012). Social Relations in Ottoman Diyarbekir, 1870-1915. Brill.
- Kévorkian, Raymond H. (2006). "Demographic Changes in the Armenian Population of Diarbekir, 1895-1914". In Richard G. Hovannisian (ed.). Armenian Tigranakert/Diarbekir and Edessa/Urfa. Mazda Publishers. pp. 250–284.
- Kévorkian, Raymond (2011). The Armenian Genocide: A Complete History. I.B. Tauris.
