= Samanlı, Beşiri =

Village in Batman Province, Turkey

Samanlı
- Village
- Location within Turkey
- Coordinates: 37.866°N 41.363°E
- Country: Turkey
- Province: Batman
- District: Beşiri
- Population (2021): 206
- Time zone: UTC+3 (TRT)

Samanlı (Note: Formerly known as Aşağıazik, Azek, Azig-Varin, Azik-Achaghi, Azık Aşağı, or Azik-Varin.) is a village in the Beşiri District of Batman Province in Turkey. The village had a population of 206 in 2021.

== History ==
Aşağıazik (today called Samanlı) was historically inhabited by Kurdish-speaking Syriac Orthodox Christians, Armenians, and Church of the East Christians. There were 12 Armenian hearths in 1880. There was an Armenian church of Surb Hakob. It was located in the Beşiri kaza in the Diyarbakır sanjak in the Diyarbekir vilayet in c. 1900. It was populated by 100 Syriacs in 1914, according to the list presented to the Paris Peace Conference by the Assyro-Chaldean delegation. (Note: The list presented to the Paris Peace Conference by the Assyro-Chaldean delegation does not distinguish between Aşağıazik (Samanlı) and Yukarıazik (Değirmenüstü).) The Armenians were attacked by the Belek, Bekran, Şegro, and other Kurdish tribes in May 1915 amidst the Armenian genocide.

== Bibliography ==
- Gaunt, David (2006). Massacres, Resistance, Protectors: Muslim-Christian Relations in Eastern Anatolia during World War I. Gorgias Press.
- Jongerden, Joost; Verheij, Jelle, eds. (2012). Social Relations in Ottoman Diyarbekir, 1870-1915. Brill.
- Kévorkian, Raymond H. (2006). "Demographic Changes in the Armenian Population of Diarbekir, 1895-1914". In Richard G. Hovannisian (ed.). Armenian Tigranakert/Diarbekir and Edessa/Urfa. Mazda Publishers. pp. 250–284.
- Kévorkian, Raymond (2011). The Armenian Genocide: A Complete History. I.B. Tauris.
