= Eskihamur, Beşiri =

Village in Batman Province, Turkey

Eskihamur
- Village
- Location within Turkey
- Coordinates: 38.023°N 41.307°E
- Country: Turkey
- Province: Batman
- District: Beşiri
- Population (2021): 723
- Time zone: UTC+3 (TRT)

Eskihamur (Kurdish: Newale) is a village in the Beşiri District of Batman Province in Turkey. The village is populated by Kurds of the Reşkotan tribe and had a population of 723 in 2021.

The hamlets of Bayramlı, Çamlıtepe, Döşeme, İslam and Nejan are attached to the village.
