= Alaca, Beşiri =

Village in Batman Province, Turkey

Alaca
- Village
- Location within Turkey
- Coordinates: 37.763°N 41.480°E
- Country: Turkey
- Province: Batman
- District: Beşiri
- Population (2021): 424
- Time zone: UTC+3 (TRT)

Alaca (Kurdish: Dera Hamzo) is a village in the Beşiri District of Batman Province in Turkey. The village is populated by Kurds of the Elîkan tribe and had a population of 424 in 2021.

The hamlet of Kesiktaş is attached to the village.
