= Esence, Beşiri =

Village in Batman Province, Turkey

Esence
- Village
- Location within Turkey
- Coordinates: 38.014°N 41.373°E
- Country: Turkey
- Province: Batman
- District: Beşiri
- Population (2021): 365
- Time zone: UTC+3 (TRT)

Esence (Note: Formerly known as Kani-Kulna, Kanikul, Kanikol, or Kanikoul.) is a village in the Beşiri District of Batman Province in Turkey. The village had a population of 365 in 2021.

The hamlet of Ayışığı is attached to the village.

== History ==
Kani-Kulna (today called Esence) was historically inhabited by Syriac Orthodox Christians and Armenians. It was populated by 50 Syriacs in 1914, according to the list presented to the Paris Peace Conference by the Assyro-Chaldean delegation.

== Bibliography ==
- Gaunt, David (2006). Massacres, Resistance, Protectors: Muslim-Christian Relations in Eastern Anatolia during World War I. Gorgias Press.
- Jongerden, Joost; Verheij, Jelle, eds. (2012). Social Relations in Ottoman Diyarbekir, 1870-1915. Brill.
