= İnpınar, Beşiri =

Village in Batman Province, Turkey

İnpınar
- Village
- Location within Turkey
- Coordinates: 37.939°N 41.262°E
- Country: Turkey
- Province: Batman
- District: Beşiri
- Population (2021): 231
- Time zone: UTC+3 (TRT)

İnpınar (Kurdish: Hiznamîr) is a village in the Beşiri District of Batman Province in Turkey. The village is populated by Kurds of the Reşkotan and Sinikan tribes and had a population of 231 in 2021.

The hamlet of Alıçlı (Tapiyê) is attached to the village.
