= Ilıca, Beşiri =

Village in Batman Province, Turkey

Ilıca
- Village
- Location within Turkey
- Coordinates: 37.934°N 41.388°E
- Country: Turkey
- Province: Batman
- District: Beşiri
- Population (2021): 282
- Time zone: UTC+3 (TRT)

Ilıca (Kurdish: Germik) is a village in the Beşiri District of Batman Province in Turkey. The village is populated by Kurds of the Elîkan tribe and had a population of 282 in 2021.

The hamlets of Başlamış and Kuyuluk are attached to the village.
