= Yarımtaş, Beşiri =

Village in Batman Province, Turkey

Yarımtaş
- Village
- Location within Turkey
- Coordinates: 37.850°N 41.321°E
- Country: Turkey
- Province: Batman
- District: Beşiri
- Population (2021): 204
- Time zone: UTC+3 (TRT)

Yarımtaş (Kurdish: Keferza Jor; Syriac: Upper Kafarzū) (Note: Also known as Gavazu Yukarı, Kafarzo-Oulia, Kaferzo, Kafèrzo, Kefrzo, or Yukarıkeferzo.) is a village in the Beşiri District of Batman Province in Turkey. The village is populated by Kurds of the Reman tribe and had a population of 204 in 2021.

== History ==
Upper Kafarzū (today called Yarımtaş) was historically inhabited by Kurdish-speaking Syriac Orthodox Christians and Armenians. In the Syriac Orthodox patriarchal register of dues of 1870, it was recorded that the village had 8 households, who paid 38 dues, and did not have a church or a priest. There were 18 Armenian hearths in 1880. (Note: Kévorkian does not distinguish between Aşağıkeferzo (Yenipınar) and Yukarıkeferzo (Yarımtaş).) It was located in the Beşiri kaza in the Diyarbakır sanjak in the Diyarbekir vilayet in c. 1900. It was populated by 100 Syriacs in 1914, according to the list presented to the Paris Peace Conference by the Assyro-Chaldean delegation. The Armenians were attacked by the Belek, Bekran, Şegro, and other Kurdish tribes in May 1915 amidst the Armenian genocide.

== Bibliography ==
- Bcheiry, Iskandar (2009). The Syriac Orthodox Patriarchal Register of Dues of 1870: An Unpublished Historical Document from the Late Ottoman Period. Gorgias Press.
- Gaunt, David (2006). Massacres, Resistance, Protectors: Muslim-Christian Relations in Eastern Anatolia during World War I. Gorgias Press.
- Jongerden, Joost; Verheij, Jelle, eds. (2012). Social Relations in Ottoman Diyarbekir, 1870-1915. Brill.
- Kévorkian, Raymond H. (2006). "Demographic Changes in the Armenian Population of Diarbekir, 1895-1914". In Richard G. Hovannisian (ed.). Armenian Tigranakert/Diarbekir and Edessa/Urfa. Mazda Publishers. pp. 250–284.
- Kévorkian, Raymond (2011). The Armenian Genocide: A Complete History. I.B. Tauris.
- Tan, Altan (2018). Turabidin'den Berriye'ye. Aşiretler - Dinler - Diller - Kültürler (in Turkish). ISBN 9789944360944.
