= Kumçay, Beşiri =

Village in Batman Province, Turkey

Kumçay
- Village
- Location within Turkey
- Coordinates: 37.822°N 41.482°E
- Country: Turkey
- Province: Batman
- District: Beşiri
- Population (2021): 133
- Time zone: UTC+3 (TRT)

Kumçay (Kurdish: Silahar) is a village in the Beşiri District of Batman Province in Turkey. The village is populated by Kurds of the Elîkan tribe and had a population of 133 in 2021.

The hamlets of Hanlı and İncigedik are attached to the village.
