= Doğanpazarı, Beşiri =

Village in Batman Province, Turkey

Doğanpazarı
- Village
- Location within Turkey
- Coordinates: 37.791°N 41.676°E
- Country: Turkey
- Province: Batman
- District: Beşiri
- Population (2021): 70
- Time zone: UTC+3 (TRT)

Doğanpazarı (Kurdish: Bacriye) is a village in the Beşiri District of Batman Province in Turkey. The village is populated by Kurds and had a population of 70 in 2021.

The hamlets of Düzenli and Göktaş are attached to the village.

The village was depopulated in the 1990s.
