= Kayatepe, Beşiri =

Village in Batman Province, Turkey

Kayatepe
- Village
- Location within Turkey
- Coordinates: 37.845°N 41.642°E
- Country: Turkey
- Province: Batman
- District: Beşiri
- Population (2021): 287
- Time zone: UTC+3 (TRT)

Kayatepe (Kurdish: Sarib) is a village in the Beşiri District of Batman Province in Turkey. The village is populated by Kurds and had a population of 287 in 2021.

The hamlet of Arılı, Atbaşı and Dikili are attached to the village.

The village was depopulated in the 1990s.
