= Yazıhan, Beşiri =

Village in Batman Province, Turkey

Yazıhan
- Village
- Location within Turkey
- Coordinates: 37.841°N 41.432°E
- Country: Turkey
- Province: Batman
- District: Beşiri
- Population (2021): 105
- Time zone: UTC+3 (TRT)

Yazıhan (Kurdish: Mezrik) is a village in the Beşiri District of Batman Province in Turkey. The village is populated by Kurds of the Elîkan tribe and had a population of 105 in 2021.

The hamlets of Gedikli, Güven and Kıyımlı are attached to the village.
