= Verin Kalakut =

- Location within Armenia
- Coordinates: 40°18′33″N 44°02′43″E
- Country: Armenia
- Marz (Province): Aragatsotn
- Time zone: UTC+4 ( )

Verin Kalakut (also, Verkhniy Kalakut), is an abandoned settlement in the Aragatsotn Province of Armenia.

== See also ==
- Aragatsotn Province
