= Oğuz, Beşiri =

Village in Batman Province, Turkey

Oğuz
- Village
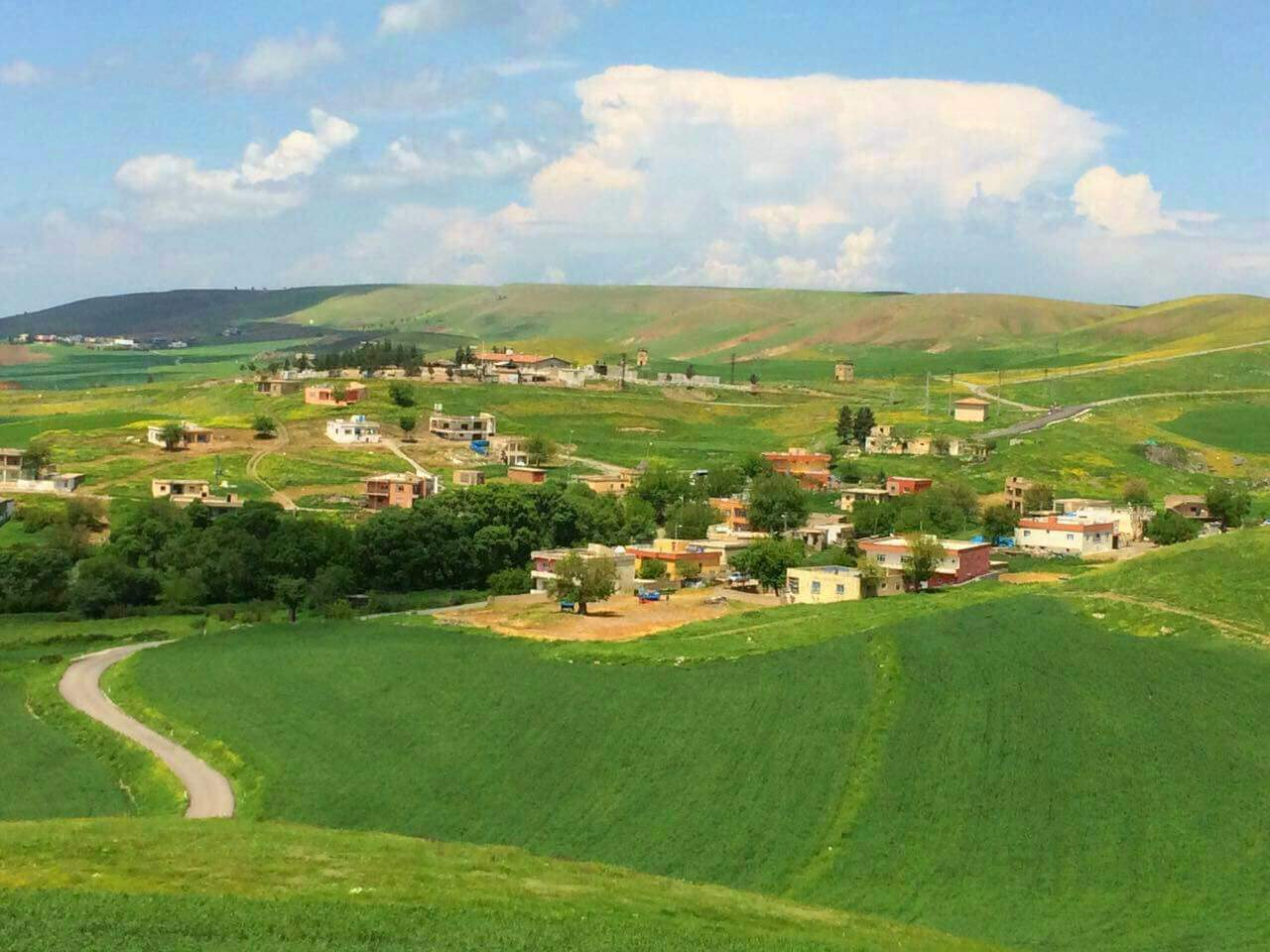

- Location within Turkey
- Coordinates: 37.818°N 41.378°E
- Country: Turkey
- Province: Batman
- District: Beşiri
- Population (2021): 405
- Time zone: UTC+3 (TRT)

Oğuz (Kurdish: Şimiz; Syriac: Šimiz) is a village in the Beşiri District of Batman Province in Turkey. The village is populated by Kurds and had a population of 405 in 2021. The village is populated by Yazidis.

The hamlets of Akdoğan, Kışlacık, Onbaşı and Yavuz are attached to the village. Onbaşı is populated by Yazidis as well.

== History ==
Šimiz (today called Oğuz) was historically inhabited by Syriac Orthodox Christians. In the Syriac Orthodox patriarchal register of dues of 1870, it was recorded that the village had 3 households, who paid 10 dues, and had one priest, but did not have a church.

== Bibliography ==
- Andrews, Peter Alford; Benninghaus, Rüdiger, eds. (1989). Ethnic Groups in the Republic of Turkey.
- Bcheiry, Iskandar (2009). The Syriac Orthodox Patriarchal Register of Dues of 1870: An Unpublished Historical Document from the Late Ottoman Period. Gorgias Press.
- Turan, Ahmet (1993). Yezidiler Tarihçeleri Coğrafi Dağılımları İnançları Örf ve Adetleri (in Turkish).
