= Mijnatun =

Mijnatun Միջնատուն
- Location within Armenia Location within Aragatsotn
- Coordinates: 40°41′38″N 44°21′24″E
- Country: Armenia
- Province: Aragatsotn
- Municipality: Alagyaz

Population (2011)
  - Total: 203
- Time zone: UTC+4 ( )
  - Summer (DST): UTC+5 ( )

Mijnatun (Armenian: Միջնատուն) is a village in the Alagyaz Municipality of the Aragatsotn Province of Armenia. It is mostly populated by Yazidis.
