= Hako, Aragatsotn =

Village in Aragatsotn, Armenia

Hako Հակո
- Location within Armenia Location within Aragatsotn
- Coordinates: 40°22′52″N 43°41′58″E
- Country: Armenia
- Province: Aragatsotn
- Municipality: Arevut

Population (2011)
  - Total: 95
- Time zone: UTC+4

Hako (Armenian: Հակո) is a village in the Arevut Municipality of the Aragatsotn Province of Armenia. It is mostly populated by Yazidis. The population of Hako was 95 as per the 2011 census, down from 229 reported in the 2001 census.
