= Ddmasar =

Ddmasar Դդմասար
- Location within Armenia Location within Aragatsotn
- Coordinates: 40°21′N 43°50′E
- Country: Armenia
- Province: Aragatsotn
- Municipality: Arevut

Population (2011)
  - Total: 94
- Time zone: UTC+4
  - Summer (DST): UTC+5

Ddmasar (Armenian: Դդմասար) is a village in the Arevut Municipality of the Aragatsotn Province of Armenia. The town is mostly populated by Yazidis.
