= Yeghegnut, Armavir =

Village in Armavir, Armenia

Yeghegnut Եղեգնուտ
- Location within Armenia
- Coordinates: 40°05′25″N 44°09′45″E
- Country: Armenia
- Marz (Province): Armavir

Population (2011)
  - Total: 2,203
- Time zone: UTC+4 ( )
  - Summer (DST): UTC+5 ( )

Yeghegnut (Armenian: Եղեգնուտ, until 1947 Ghamishlu; before 1947 Sefiabad, Molla Badal, and Badal), is a village in the Armavir Province of Armenia. The majority of the village are Armenians (70%) with 663 (around 30%) of the Yazidi minority.

== See also ==
- Armavir Province
- Yazidis in Armenia
