= Yalınca, Beşiri =

Village in Batman Province, Turkey

Yalınca
- Village
- Location within Turkey
- Coordinates: 37.813°N 41.639°E
- Country: Turkey
- Province: Batman
- District: Beşiri
- Population (2021): 54
- Time zone: UTC+3 (TRT)

Yalınca (Kurdish: Savdik) is a village in the Beşiri District of Batman Province in Turkey. The village is populated by Kurds and had a population of 54 in 2021.

The hamlets of Çimenli, Ortaköy, Sapanlı and Tatlıca are attached to the village.

The village was depopulated in the 1990s.
