= Agdzhakishlag =

- Location within Armenia
- Coordinates: 40°08′N 44°26′E
- Country: Armenia
- Marz (Province): Yerevan
- Time zone: UTC+4 ( )
  - Summer (DST): UTC+5 ( )

Agdzhakishlag or Aghjaghshlagh is a town in the Yerevan Province of Armenia.

== See also ==
- Getazat, alternative name for the province is Aghjaghshlagh
