= Kanch =

Village in Aragatsotn, Armenia

Kanch Կանչ
- Location within Armenia Location within Aragatsotn
- Coordinates: 40°23′N 43°44′E
- Country: Armenia
- Province: Aragatsotn
- Municipality: Arevut

Population (2011)
  - Total: 101
- Time zone: UTC+4
  - Summer (DST): UTC+5

Kanch (Armenian: Կանչ) is a village in the Arevut Municipality of the Aragatsotn Province of Armenia. The town is mostly populated by Yezidis.
