= Sorik =

Village in Aragatsotn, Armenia

Sorik Սորիկ
- Location within Armenia Location within Aragatsotn
- Coordinates: 40°24′N 43°43′E
- Country: Armenia
- Province: Aragatsotn
- Municipality: Arevut

Population (2011)
  - Total: 103
- Time zone: UTC+4
  - Summer (DST): UTC+5

Sorik (Armenian: Սորիկ) is a village in the Arevut Municipality of the Aragatsotn Province of Armenia, mostly populated by Yazidis.
