= Deveboynu, Beşiri =

Village in Batman Province, Turkey

Deveboynu
- Village
- Location within Turkey
- Coordinates: 37.865°N 41.309°E
- Country: Turkey
- Province: Batman
- District: Beşiri
- Population (2021): 124
- Time zone: UTC+3 (TRT)

Deveboynu (Kurdish: Gedûkê; Syriac: Gīdūk) (Note: Also known as Gedük, Geduk-Koy, Gédouk-Keuï, Gédouk-Kiugh, Geydük, Gondek, Gueduk, or Kedik.) is a village in the Beşiri District of Batman Province in Turkey. The village is populated by Kurds of the Reman tribe and had a population of 124 in 2021. The village is Yazidi.

== History ==
Gīdūk (today called Deveboynu) was historically inhabited by Syriac Orthodox Christians and Kurdish-speaking Armenians. In the Syriac Orthodox patriarchal register of dues of 1870, it was recorded that the village had 10 households, who paid 18 dues, and did not have a church or a priest. There were 8 Armenian hearths in 1880. There was an Armenian church of Surb Tovmas.

It was populated by 250 Syriacs in 1914, according to the list presented to the Paris Peace Conference by the Assyro-Chaldean delegation. The Armenians were attacked by the Belek, Bekran, Şegro, and other Kurdish tribes in May 1915 amidst the Armenian genocide.

== Bibliography ==
- Bcheiry, Iskandar (2009). The Syriac Orthodox Patriarchal Register of Dues of 1870: An Unpublished Historical Document from the Late Ottoman Period. Gorgias Press.
- Çakar, Mehmet Sait (2008). Yezidîlik: tarih ve metinler : Kürtçe ve Arapça nüshaları (in Turkish). Vadi Yayınları.
- Gaunt, David (2006). Massacres, Resistance, Protectors: Muslim-Christian Relations in Eastern Anatolia during World War I. Gorgias Press.
- Jongerden, Joost; Verheij, Jelle, eds. (2012). Social Relations in Ottoman Diyarbekir, 1870-1915. Brill.
- Kévorkian, Raymond H. (2006). "Demographic Changes in the Armenian Population of Diarbekir, 1895-1914". In Richard G. Hovannisian (ed.). Armenian Tigranakert/Diarbekir and Edessa/Urfa. Mazda Publishers.
- Kévorkian, Raymond (2011). The Armenian Genocide: A Complete History. I.B. Tauris.
