= Kumgeçit, Beşiri =

Village in Batman Province, Turkey

Kumgeçit
- Village
- Location within Turkey
- Coordinates: 37.818°N 41.479°E
- Country: Turkey
- Province: Batman
- District: Beşiri
- Population (2021): 48
- Time zone: UTC+3 (TRT)

Kumgeçit (Kurdish: Bazîvan) is a village in the Beşiri District of Batman Province in Turkey. The village is populated by Kurds of the Elîkan tribe and had a population of 48 in 2021. The hamlet of Meydancık (Dusa) is attached to the village.

Both Kumgeçit and Meydancık are populated by Yazidis.
