= Kuşçukuru, Beşiri =

Village in Batman Province, Turkey

Kuşçukuru
- Village
- Location within Turkey
- Coordinates: 37.948°N 41.291°E
- Country: Turkey
- Province: Batman
- District: Beşiri
- Population (2021): 147
- Time zone: UTC+3 (TRT)

Kuşçukuru (Kurdish: Kelhok; Syriac: Kelhūk) (Note: Also known as Kalhok, Kelhök, Kerhök, or Melhük.) is a village in the Beşiri District of Batman Province in Turkey. The village is populated by Kurds of the Reşkotan tribe and had a population of 147 in 2021. The village is populated by Yazidis.

The hamlets of Ekinciler and Mezelkan are attached to the village. Ekinciler is also populated by Yazidis.

== History ==
Kelhūk (today called Kuşçukuru) was historically inhabited by Syriac Orthodox Christians and Armenians. In the Syriac Orthodox patriarchal register of dues of 1870, it was recorded that the village had 3 households, who paid 28 dues, and did not have a church or a priest.

== Bibliography ==
- Bcheiry, Iskandar (2009). The Syriac Orthodox Patriarchal Register of Dues of 1870: An Unpublished Historical Document from the Late Ottoman Period. Gorgias Press.
- Jongerden, Joost; Verheij, Jelle, eds. (2012). Social Relations in Ottoman Diyarbekir, 1870-1915. Brill.
- Temel, Mihemed Seid (2016). Eşîra Reşkotan (in Kurdish). Nûbihar.
- Turan, Ahmet (1993). Yezidiler Tarihçeleri Coğrafi Dağılımları İnançları Örf ve Adetleri (in Turkish).
