= Güvercinlik, Beşiri =

Village in Batman Province, Turkey

Güvercinlik
- Village
- Location within Turkey
- Coordinates: 37.818°N 41.613°E
- Country: Turkey
- Province: Batman
- District: Beşiri
- Population (2021): 51
- Time zone: UTC+3 (TRT)

Güvercinlik (Syriac: Dār Awṣel) is a village in the Beşiri District of Batman Province in Turkey. The village had a population of 51 in 2021.

== History ==
Dār Awṣel (today called Güvercinlik) was historically inhabited by Syriac Orthodox Christians. In the Syriac Orthodox patriarchal register of dues of 1870, it was recorded that the village had 8 households, who paid 14 dues, and did not have a church or a priest.

== Bibliography ==
- Bcheiry, Iskandar (2009). The Syriac Orthodox Patriarchal Register of Dues of 1870: An Unpublished Historical Document from the Late Ottoman Period. Gorgias Press.
