= Yeşiloba, Beşiri =

Village in Batman Province, Turkey

Yeşiloba
- Village
- Location within Turkey
- Coordinates: 37.894°N 41.410°E
- Country: Turkey
- Province: Batman
- District: Beşiri
- Population (2021): 134
- Time zone: UTC+3 (TRT)

Yeşiloba is a village in the Beşiri District of Batman Province in Turkey. The village had a population of 134 in 2021.
