= Kaniashir =

Kaniashir Կանիաշիր
- Location within Armenia Location within Aragatsotn
- Coordinates: 40°39′23″N 44°14′30″E
- Country: Armenia
- Province: Aragatsotn
- Municipality: Alagyaz

Population (2011)
  - Total: 292
- Time zone: UTC+4 ( )
  - Summer (DST): UTC+5 ( )

Kaniashir (Armenian: Կանիաշիր) is a village in the Alagyaz Municipality of the Aragatsotn Province of Armenia. The village is mostly populated by Yezidis.
