= Kurukavak, Beşiri =

Village in Batman Province, Turkey

Kurukavak
- Village
- Location within Turkey
- Coordinates: 37.855°N 41.573°E
- Country: Turkey
- Province: Batman
- District: Beşiri
- Population (2021): 109
- Time zone: UTC+3 (TRT)

Kurukavak (Kurdish: Hemdûna) is a village in the Beşiri District of Batman Province in Turkey. The village is populated by Kurds of non-tribal affiliation and had a population of 109 in 2021. The village is populated by Yazidis.

The hamlet of Ortaalan is attached to the village.
