= Beyçayırı, Beşiri =

Village in Batman Province, Turkey

Beyçayırı
- Village
- Location within Turkey
- Coordinates: 38.017°N 41.331°E
- Country: Turkey
- Province: Batman
- District: Beşiri
- Population (2021): 575
- Time zone: UTC+3 (TRT)

Beyçayırı (Kurdish: Herfasê) is a village in the Beşiri District of Batman Province in Turkey. The village is populated by Kurds of the Reşkotan tribe and had a population of 575 in 2021.
