= Rya Taza =

Rya Taza Ռյա Թազա
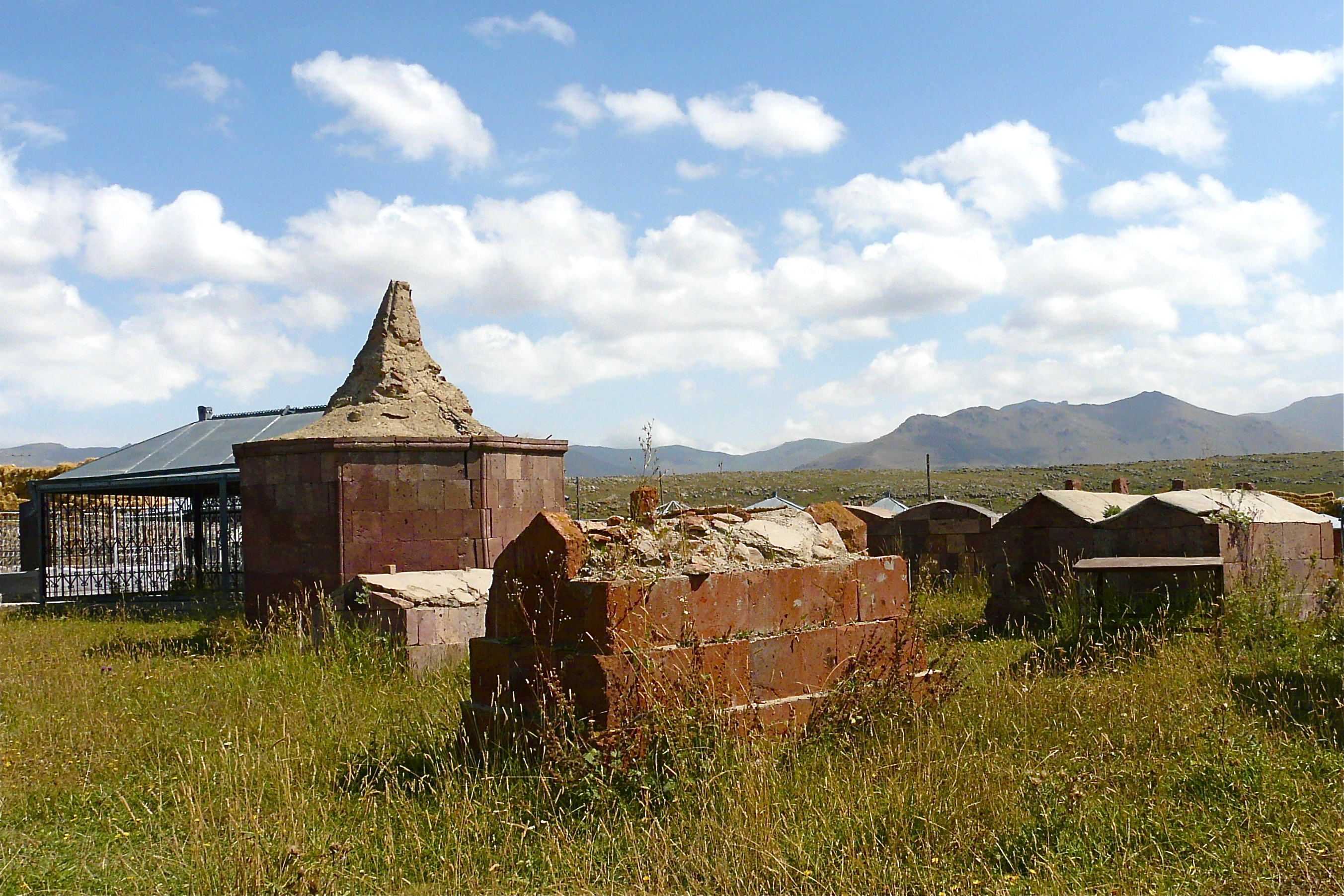
- View from the village

- Location within Armenia Location within Aragatsotn
- Coordinates: 40°39′28″N 44°18′00″E
- Country: Armenia
- Province: Aragatsotn
- Municipality: Alagyaz

Population (2011)
  - Total: 531
- Time zone: UTC+4
  - Summer (DST): UTC+5

Rya Taza (Armenian: Ռյա Թազա) or Ria Taza (Kurdish: Ria Taza, lit. 'New way') is a village in the Alagyaz Municipality of the Aragatsotn Province of Armenia. It was formerly known as Kondakhsaz or known by locals as Qundesaz. Most residents of Rya Taza are Sîpkî Yezidis who migrated to the Aparan region from Kars in the 19th century.

The village is home to a ruined Armenian church built between the 10th and 13th centuries. It also contains an old cemetery with animal-shaped tombstones. In December 2020, a Yezidi cleric from the Lalish holy site located in Iraq blessed a newly built temple named after Shekhubekir (Şêxûbekir) which is open to the public.

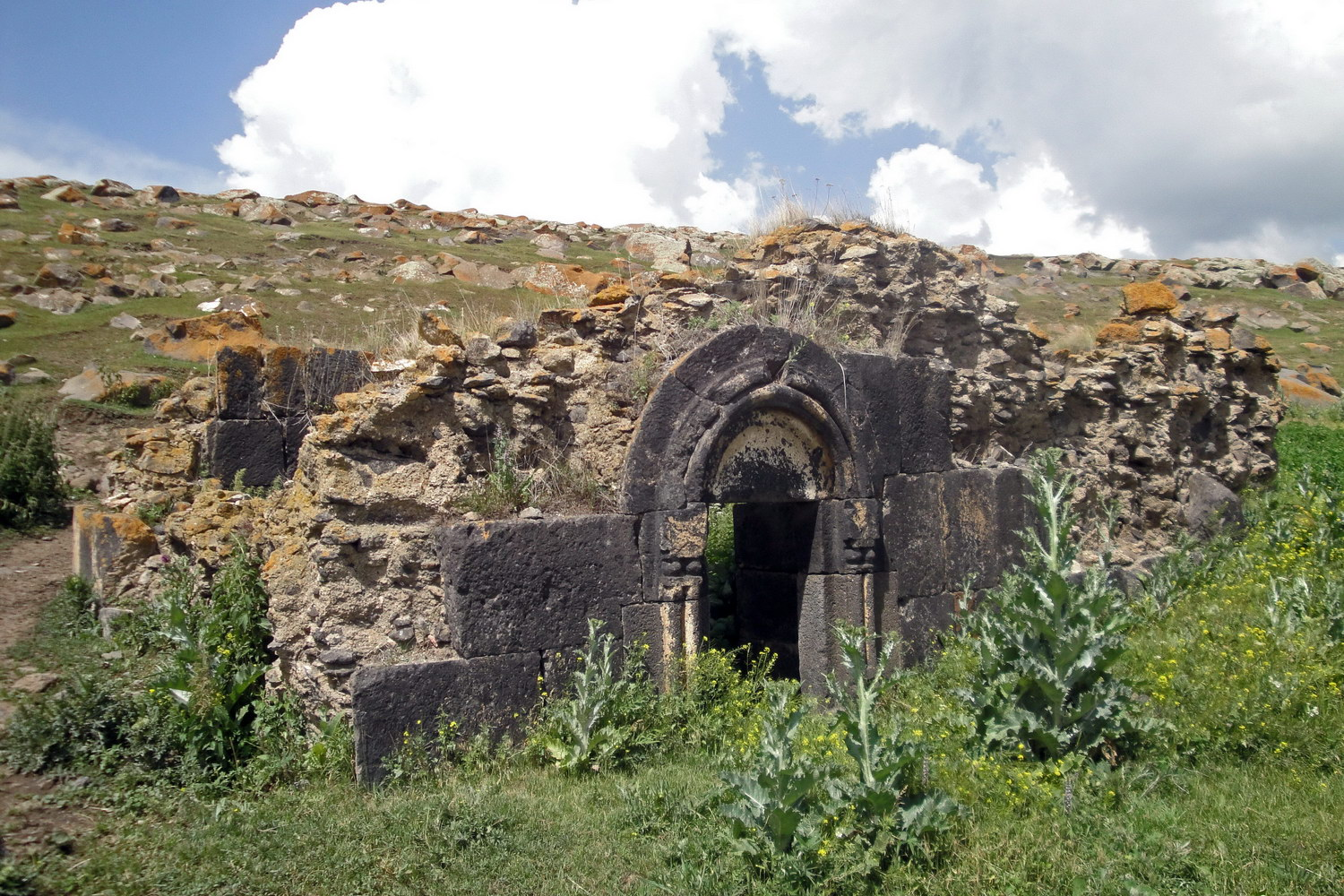
Ruined St. Sarkis church

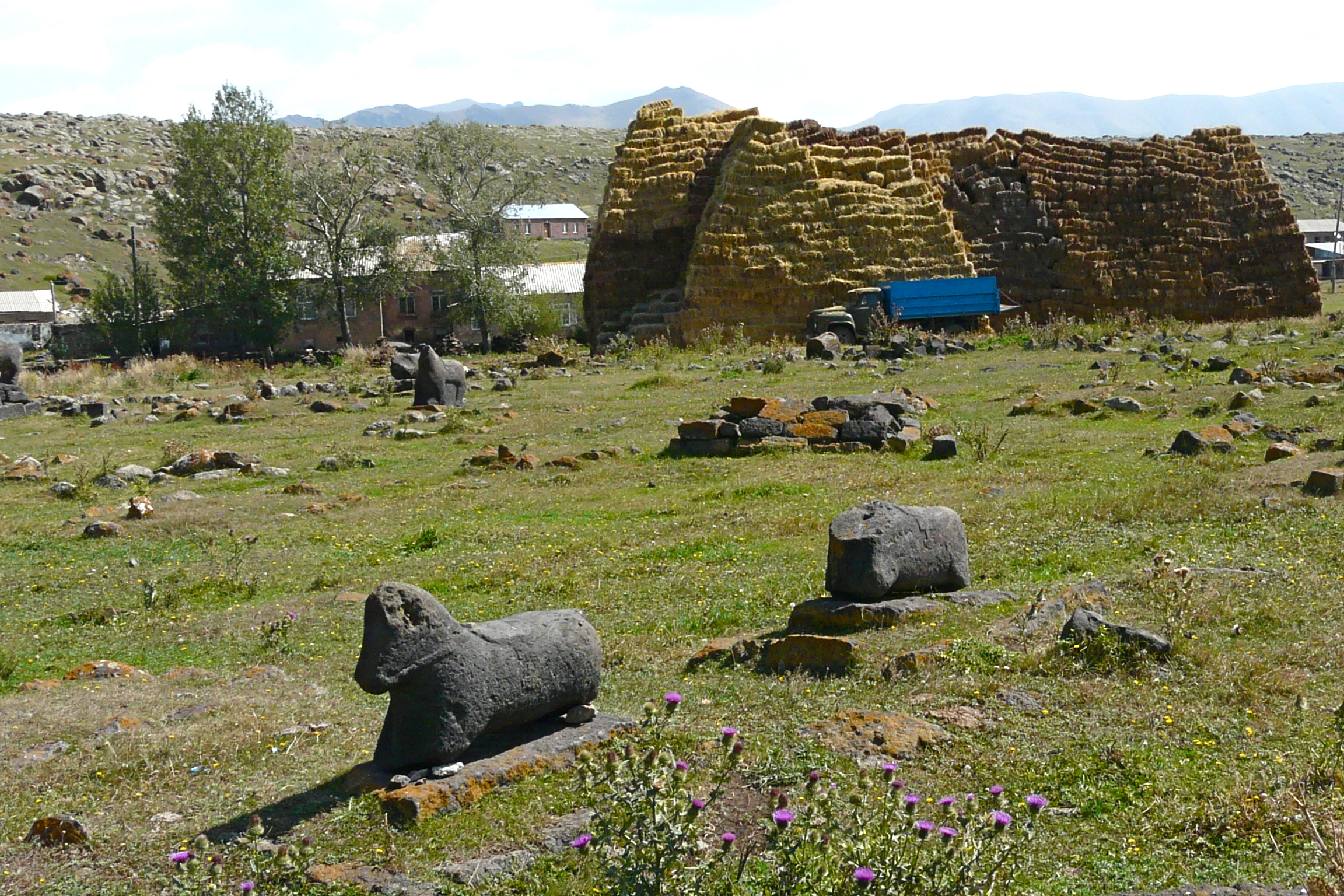
Cemetery featuring animal-shaped monuments

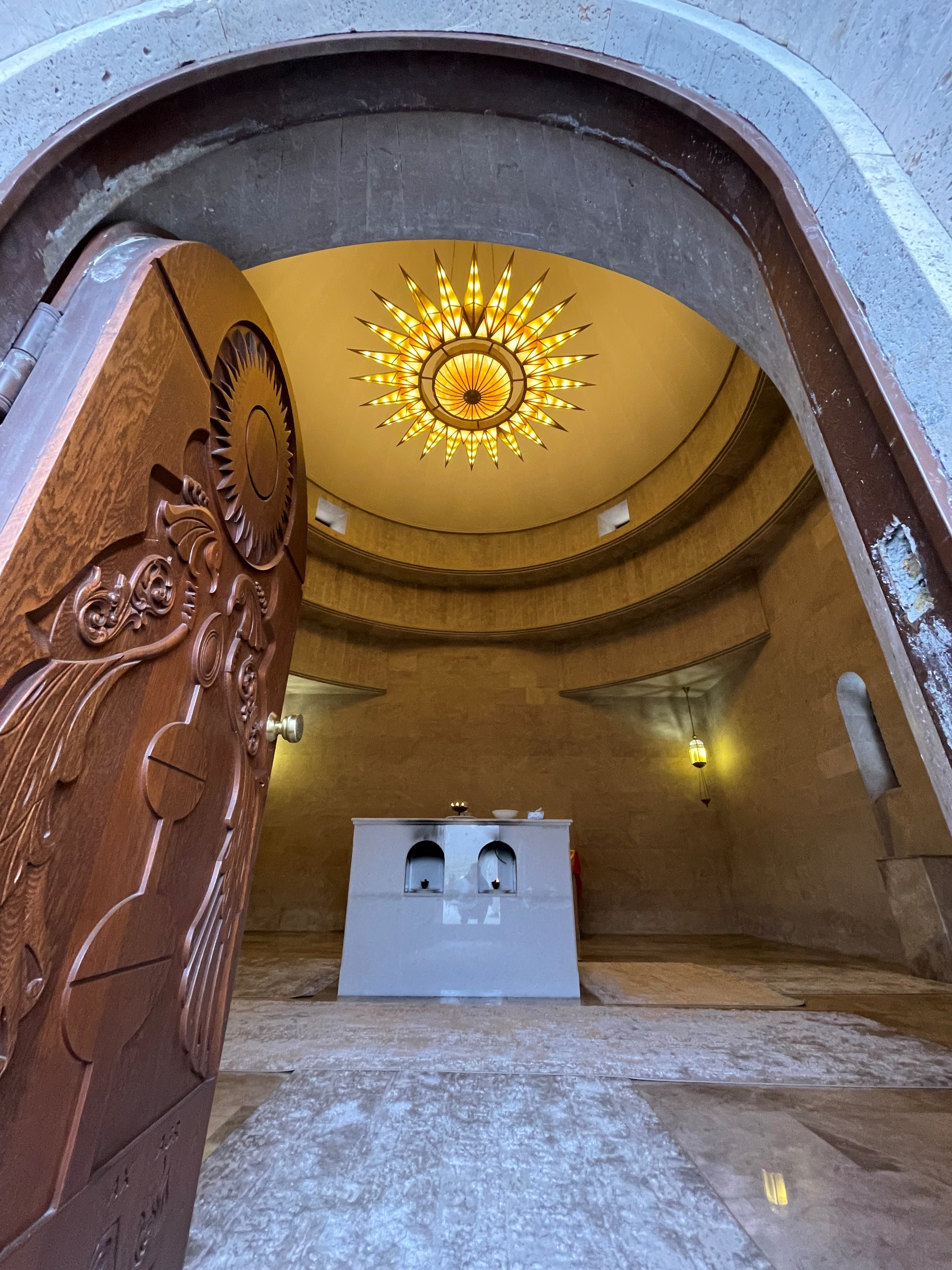
The entrance to the Yezidi temple

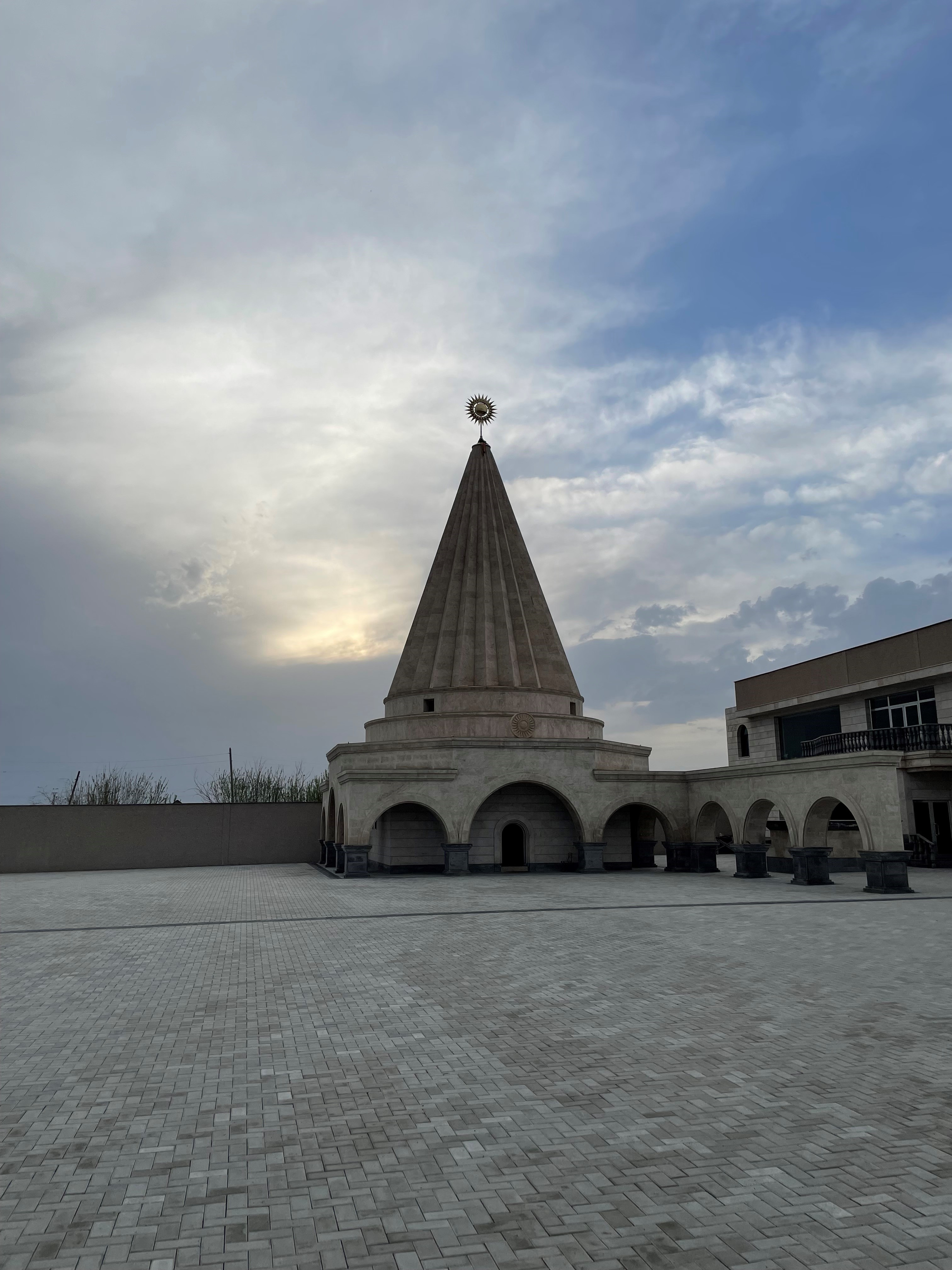
The Yezidi temple
