= Avshen =

Avshen Ավշեն
- Location within Armenia Location within Aragatsotn
- Coordinates: 40°43′33″N 44°17′30″E
- Country: Armenia
- Province: Aragatsotn
- Municipality: Alagyaz

Population (2011)
  - Total: 229
- Time zone: UTC+4 ( )
  - Summer (DST): UTC+5 ( )

Avshen (Armenian: Ավշեն) is a village in the Alagyaz Municipality of the Aragatsotn Province of Armenia.
