= Jamshlu =

Village in Aragatsotn, Armenia

Jamshlu Ջամշլու
- Location within Armenia Location within Aragatsotn
- Coordinates: 40°41′26″N 44°16′25″E
- Country: Armenia
- Province: Aragatsotn
- Municipality: Alagyaz

Population (2011)
  - Total: 197<ref"Aragatsotn (Armenia): Towns and Villages in Municipalities". www.citypopulation.de.</ref>
- Time zone: UTC+4 ( )
  - Summer (DST): UTC+5 ( )

Jamshlu or Jamushvan (Armenian: Ջամշլու or Ջամուշվան; Kurdish: Camuşlû) is a village in the Alagyaz Municipality of the Aragatsotn Province of Armenia. The town is mostly populated by Yazidis.
