= Shenkani =

Shenkani Շենկանի
- Location within Armenia Location within Aragatsotn
- Coordinates: 40°38′34″N 44°16′24″E
- Country: Armenia
- Province: Aragatsotn
- Municipality: Alagyaz

Population (2011)
  - Total: 255
- Time zone: UTC+4
  - Summer (DST): UTC+5

Shenkani (Armenian: Շենկանի) is a village in the Alagyaz Municipality of the Aragatsotn Province of Armenia. The town is mostly populated by Yazidis.
