= Otevan =

Otevan Օթևան
- Location within Armenia Location within Aragatsotn
- Coordinates: 40°21′39″N 44°03′19″E
- Country: Armenia
- Province: Aragatsotn
- Municipality: Metzadzor

Population (2011)
  - Total: 181
- Time zone: UTC+4
  - Summer (DST): UTC+5

Otevan (Armenian: Օթևան) is a village in the Metsadzor Municipality of the Aragatsotn Province of Armenia. The village is home to a 12th-century ruined Armenian church as well as the ruins of a fortress and is mostly populated by Yezidis.

== See also ==
- Genocide of Yazidis by ISIL
- Yazidis in Armenia
