= Uğurca, Beşiri =

Village in Batman Province, Turkey

Uğurca
- Village
- Location within Turkey
- Coordinates: 37.979°N 41.331°E
- Country: Turkey
- Province: Batman
- District: Beşiri
- Population (2021): 122
- Time zone: UTC+3 (TRT)

Uğurca (Kurdish: Qorix) is a village in the Beşiri District of Batman Province in Turkey. The village is populated by Kurds of the Reşkotan tribe and had a population of 122 in 2021. The village is populated by Yazidis.
