= Çakıllı, Beşiri =

Village in Batman Province, Turkey

Çakıllı
- Village
- Location within Turkey
- Coordinates: 37.813°N 41.578°E
- Country: Turkey
- Province: Batman
- District: Beşiri
- Population (2021): 172
- Time zone: UTC+3 (TRT)

Çakıllı (Kurdish: Bînarîn; Syriac: Bīnārīn) is a village in the Beşiri District of Batman Province in Turkey. The village had a population of 172 in 2021.

The hamlet of Yağlıca is attached to the village.

== History ==
Bīnārīn (today called Çakıllı) was historically inhabited by Syriac Orthodox Christians. In the Syriac Orthodox patriarchal register of dues of 1870, it was recorded that the village had 4 households, who paid 10 dues, and did not have a church or a priest.

== Bibliography ==
- Bcheiry, Iskandar (2009). The Syriac Orthodox Patriarchal Register of Dues of 1870: An Unpublished Historical Document from the Late Ottoman Period. Gorgias Press.
