= Dağyolu, Beşiri =

Village in Batman Province, Turkey

Dağyolu
- Village
- Location within Turkey
- Coordinates: 37.821°N 41.344°E
- Country: Turkey
- Province: Batman
- District: Beşiri
- Population (2021): 221
- Time zone: UTC+3 (TRT)

Dağyolu (Kurdish: Şihe) is a village in the Beşiri District of Batman Province in Turkey. The village had a population of 221 in 2021.
