= Üçkuyular, Beşiri =

Village in Batman Province, Turkey

Üçkuyular
- Village
- Location within Turkey
- Coordinates: 37.821°N 41.321°E
- Country: Turkey
- Province: Batman
- District: Beşiri
- Population (2021): 30
- Time zone: UTC+3 (TRT)

Üçkuyular (Kurdish: Feqîra) is a village in the Beşiri District of Batman Province in Turkey. The village is populated by Kurds and had a population of 30 in 2021. The village is Yazidi.
