= Metsadzor =

Metsadzor Մեծաձոր
- Location within Armenia Location within Aragatsotn
- Coordinates: 40°23′N 44°03′E
- Country: Armenia
- Province: Aragatsotn
- Municipality: Metsadzor

Population (2001)
  - Total: 159
- Time zone: UTC+4
  - Summer (DST): UTC+5

Metsadzor (Armenian: Մեծաձոր) is a village in the Metsadzor Municipality of the Aragatsotn Province of Armenia. Most inhabitants are Yezidis – the town's name means "waterless" in Kurdish.
