= Yolkonak, Beşiri =

Village in Batman Province, Turkey

Yolkonak
- Village
- Location within Turkey
- Coordinates: 37.937°N 41.314°E
- Country: Turkey
- Province: Batman
- District: Beşiri
- Population (2021): 71
- Time zone: UTC+3 (TRT)

Yolkonak (Kurdish: Hacrê, Hicrê) is a village in the Beşiri District of Batman Province in Turkey. The village is populated by Kurds of the Reşkotan tribe and had a population of 71 in 2021. It is populated by both Muslims and Yazidis.
