= Beşiri District =

District of Batman Province, Turkey

- District
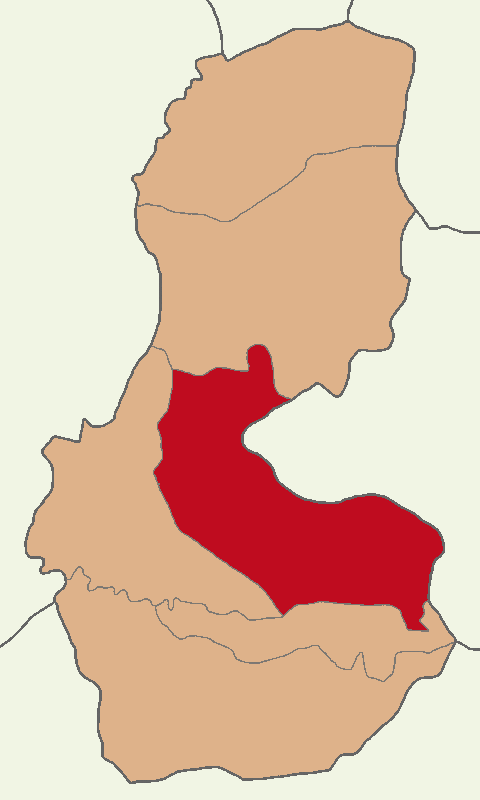
- Map showing Beşiri District in Batman Province

- Location in Turkey
- Coordinates: 37°55′N 41°18′E
- Country: Turkey
- Province: Batman
- Seat: Beşiri

Government
  - Kaymakam: Mahmut Şener
- Area: 809 km^{2} (312 sq mi)
- Population (2021): 30,928
  - Density: 38.2/km^{2} (99.0/sq mi)
- Time zone: UTC+3 (TRT)
- Website: www.besiri.gov.tr

Beşiri District is a district of the Batman Province of Turkey. Its seat is the town Beşiri. Its area is 809 km^{2}, and the district had a population of 30,928 in 2021.

== Yazidi presence ==
Beşiri once had large Kurdish Yazidi population, in villages like Kurukavak (Hamdûna) and Uğrak (Texeriyê), only a couple of Yazidi families remain today. However, elsewhere, in Yolveren (Çinêra), Oğuz (Şimzê) and Üçkuyular (Faqîra), some families have returned from diaspora to settle again. These families, have constructed a social and traditional condolence house in Üçkuyular village, with support from the diaspora community in Europe. Villagers and the neighbouring villages use the building as a community place, where they do weddings, funerals and other occasions, as well as prayers. The diaspora Yezidis that funded the house usually have vacation there in the summer. The purpose of this house, which has four rooms, a kitchen and a prayer room, is to help preserve Yazidi presence, culture and traditions in the area.

== Composition ==
There are two municipalities in Beşiri District:

- Beşiri
- İkiköprü

There are 53 villages in Beşiri District:

- Alaca
- Asmadere
- Atbağı
- Ayrancı
- Bahçeli
- Başarı
- Beşpınar
- Beyçayırı
- Bilek
- Çakıllı
- Çavuşbayırı
- Çığırlı
- Dağyolu
- Danalı
- Dayılar
- Değirmenüstü
- Deveboynu
- Doğankavak
- Doğanpazarı
- Durucak
- Esence
- Eskihamur
- Güvercinlik
- İkiyaka
- Ilıca
- İnpınar
- Işıkveren
- Karatepe
- Kaşüstü
- Kayatepe
- Kumçay
- Kumgeçit
- Kurukavak
- Kuşçukuru
- Kütüklü
- Oğuz
- Örmegöze
- Otluca
- Samanlı
- Tekağaç
- Tepecik
- Uğurca
- Üçkuyular
- Yakacık
- Yalınca
- Yalınkavak
- Yarımtaş
- Yazıhan
- Yenipınar
- Yeniyol
- Yeşiloba
- Yolkonak
- Yontukyazı

The district encompasses fifty hamlets.
