= Mirak, Armenia =

Mirak Միրաք
- Location within Armenia Location within Aragatsotn
- Coordinates: 40°38′42″N 44°19′27″E
- Country: Armenia
- Province: Aragatsotn
- Municipality: Alagyaz

Population (2011)
  - Total: 125
- Time zone: UTC+4
  - Summer (DST): UTC+5

Mirak (Armenian: Միրաք) is a village in the Alagyaz Municipality of the Aragatsotn Province of Armenia. The town's 5th-century church is in ruins.
