= Cumhuriyet, Beşiri =

Neighbourhood in Batman Province, Turkey

Cumhuriyet
- Neighbourhood
- Location within Turkey
- Coordinates: 37.93059°N 41.28937°E
- Country: Turkey
- Province: Batman
- District: Beşiri
- Time zone: UTC+3 (TRT)

Cumhuriyet (Syriac: Tāḫāriyyah), (Note: Also known as Tahari or T’akhori.) formerly known as Uğrak, is a neighbourhood in the Beşiri District of Batman Province in Turkey.

== History ==
Tāḫāriyyah (today called Cumhuriyet) was historically inhabited by Syriac Orthodox Christians and Armenians. In the Syriac Orthodox patriarchal register of dues of 1870, it was recorded that the village had 3 households, who paid 18 dues, and did not have a church or a priest.

In 2000, it was populated by 11 Yazidis. By 2013, there were 4 Yazidi families.

== Bibliography ==
- Bcheiry, Iskandar (2009). The Syriac Orthodox Patriarchal Register of Dues of 1870: An Unpublished Historical Document from the Late Ottoman Period. Gorgias Press.
- Jongerden, Joost; Verheij, Jelle, eds. (2012). Social Relations in Ottoman Diyarbekir, 1870-1915. Brill.
- Ulutürk, Muammer (2013). "Etno-Dinsel Bir Topluluk Olan Ezidilerin Batman ve Çevresindeki Son Yerleşim Yerleri ve Nüfusları Üzerine" (PDF). Turkish Studies (in Turkish). 8 (5): 841–848.
