= Zovuni =

Zovuni Զովունի
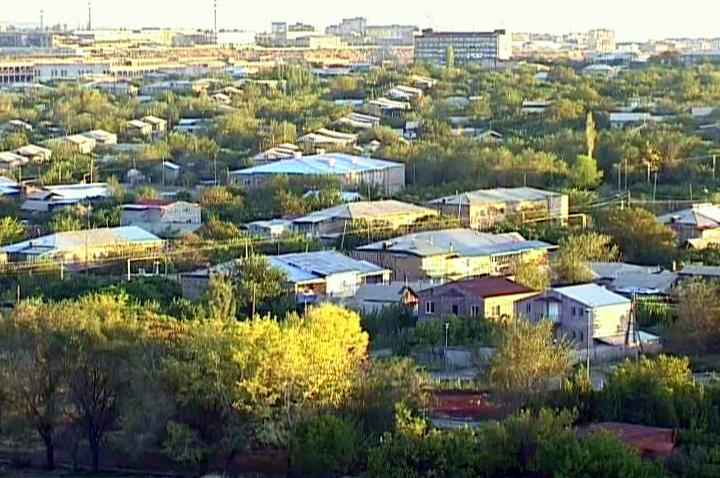
- Zovuni

- Location within Armenia
- Coordinates: 40°14′11″N 44°30′14″E
- Country: Armenia
- Province: Kotayk
- Elevation: 1,240 m (4,070 ft)

Population (2024 census)
  - Total: 7,290

Zovuni (Armenian: Զովունի), is a major village in the Kotayk Province of Armenia, located just north of the capital Yerevan. As of the 2024 census, the population of the village is 7,290.

== Notable people ==
- Koryun Soghomonyan, Armenian boxer

== See also ==
- Kotayk Province
