= Geghanist, Ararat =

Geghanist Գեղանիստ
- Location within Armenia Location within Ararat
- Coordinates: 40°08′59″N 44°26′04″E
- Country: Armenia
- Province: Ararat
- Municipality: Masis

Population (2011)
  - Total: 2,739
- Time zone: UTC+4
  - Summer (DST): UTC+5

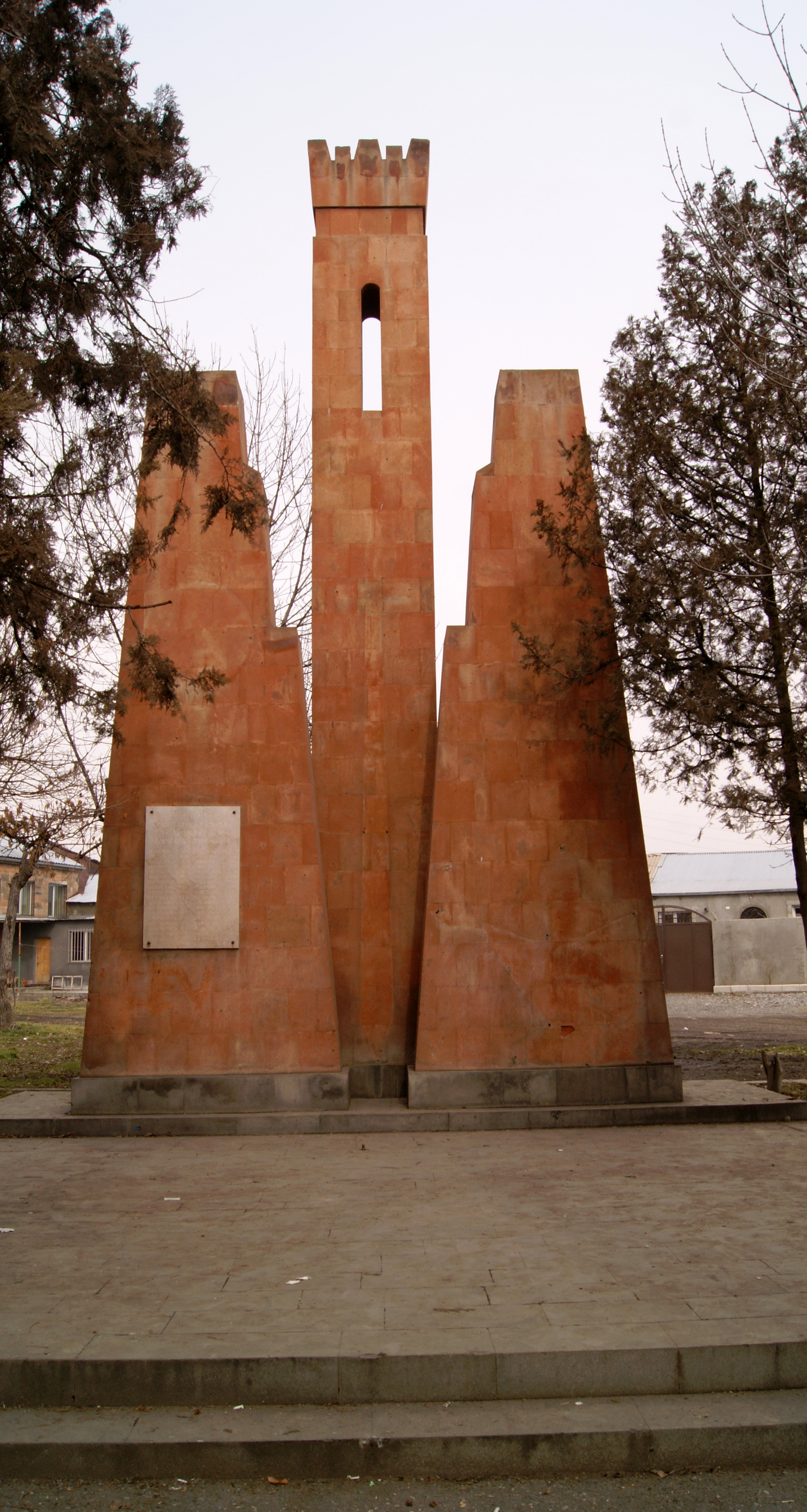
WW2 Monument in Geghanist

Geghanist (Armenian: Գեղանիստ) is a village in the Masis Municipality of the Ararat Province of Armenia.
