= Getapnya =

Getapnya Գետափնյա
- Location within Armenia Location within Ararat
- Coordinates: 40°08′26″N 44°25′57″E
- Country: Armenia
- Province: Ararat
- Municipality: Masis

Population (2011)
  - Total: 1,571
- Time zone: UTC+4
  - Summer (DST): UTC+5

Getapnya (Armenian: Գետափնյա) is a village in the Masis Municipality of the Ararat Province of Armenia.
