= Argavand, Armavir =

Village in Armavir, Armenia

Argavand Արգավանդ
- Location within Armenia
- Coordinates: 40°03′39″N 44°05′43″E
- Country: Armenia
- Marz (Province): Armavir

Population (2011)
  - Total: 2,301
- Time zone: UTC+4 ( )
  - Summer (DST): UTC+5 ( )

Argavand (Armenian: Արգավանդ; formerly, Uzunoba) is a village in the Armavir Province of Armenia.

== See also ==
- Armavir Province
