= Ghazaravan =

Village in Aragatsotn, Armenia

Ghazaravan Ղազարավան
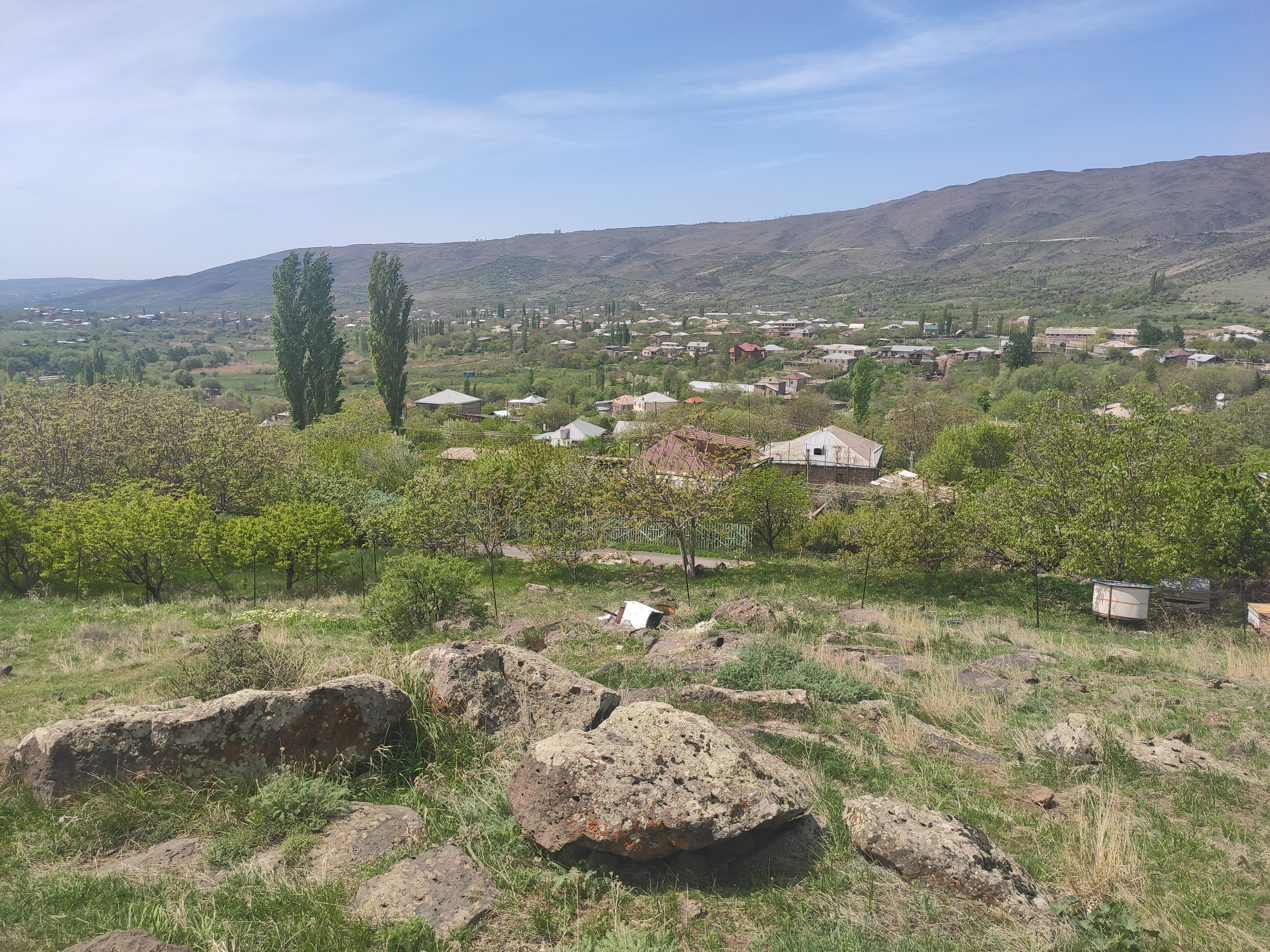
- Ղազարավան

- Location within Armenia Location within Aragatsotn
- Coordinates: 40°20′52″N 44°20′30″E
- Country: Armenia
- Province: Aragatsotn
- Municipality: Ashtarak

Population (2011)
  - Total: 450
- Time zone: UTC+4
  - Summer (DST): UTC+5

Ghazaravan (Armenian: Ղազարավան) is a village in the Ashtarak Municipality of the Aragatsotn Province of Armenia. Nearby, there are Bronze Age fortresses.
