= Getazat =

Place in Artashat Municipality, Ararat, Armenia

Getazat Գետազատ
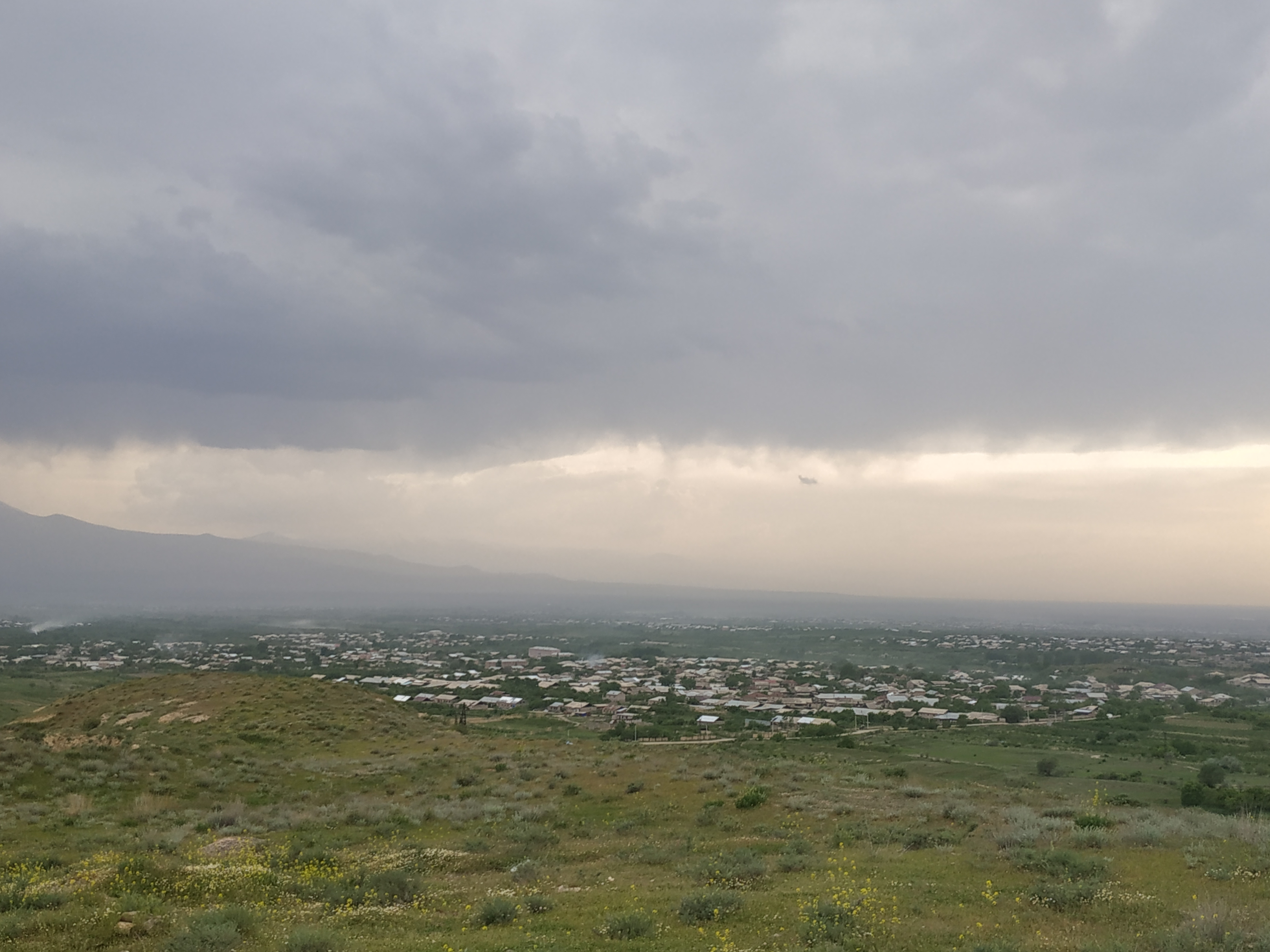
- Getazat

- Location within Armenia Location within Ararat
- Coordinates: 40°02′17″N 44°33′50″E
- Country: Armenia
- Province: Ararat
- Municipality: Artashat

Population (2011)
  - Total: 1,882
- Time zone: UTC+4
  - Summer (DST): UTC+5

Getazat (Armenian: Գետազատ), also known Getashen as until 1948, and Aghjaghshlagh,) is a village in the Artashat Municipality of the Ararat Province of Armenia.

== See also ==
- Agdzhakishlag
