= Geghanist, Shirak =

Geghanist Գեղանիստ
- Location within Armenia Location within Shirak
- Coordinates: 40°41′05″N 44°01′26″E
- Country: Armenia
- Province: Shirak
- Municipality: Artik
- Elevation: 1,850 m (6,070 ft)

Population (2011)
  - Total: 1,229
- Time zone: UTC+4
  - Summer (DST): UTC+5

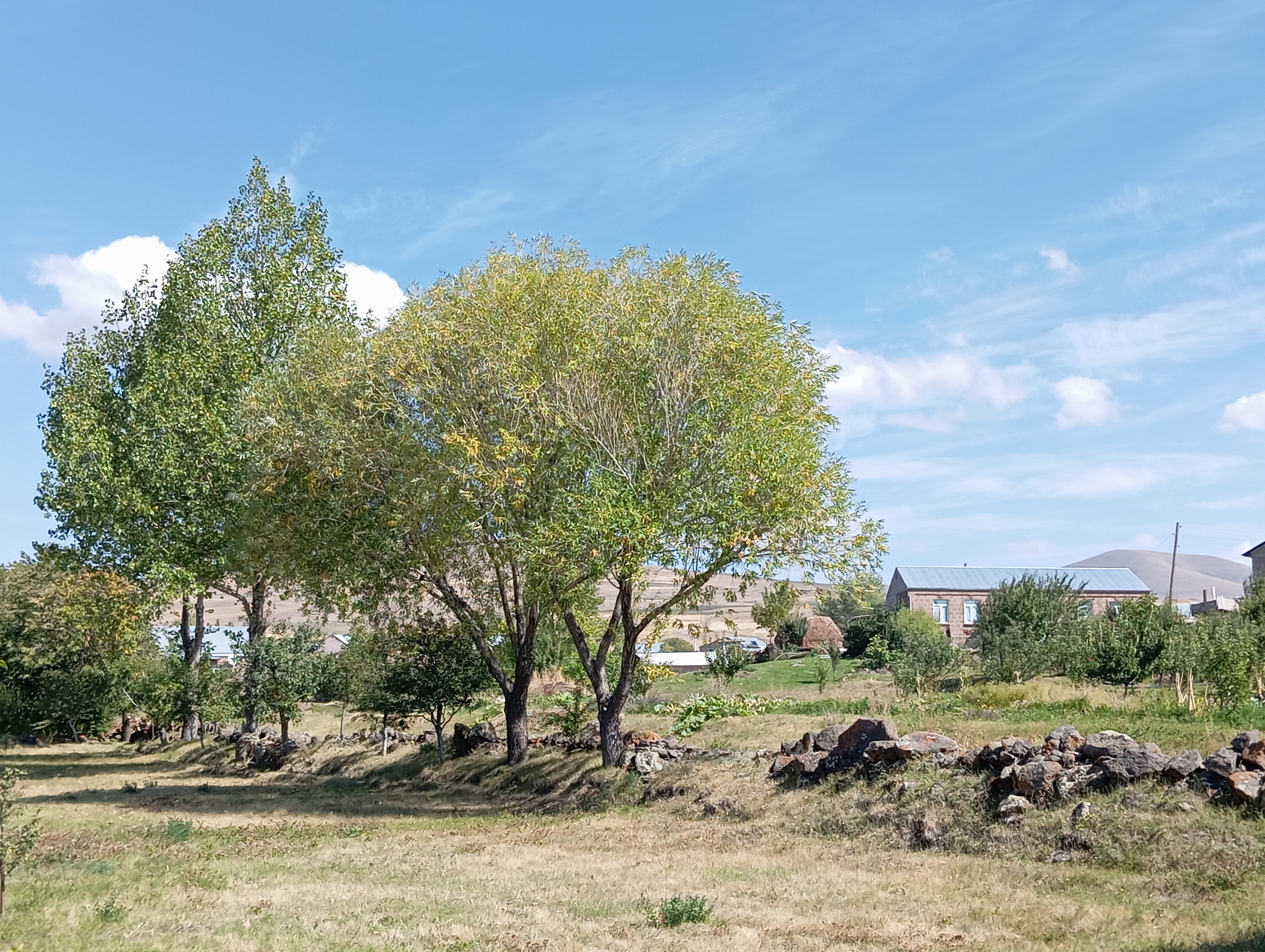
Geghanist, Shirak

Geghanist (Armenian: Գեղանիստ) is a village in the Artik Municipality of the Shirak Province of Armenia. The town's church dates from 1852. The Statistical Committee of Armenia reported its population was 1,277 in 2010, up from 1,150 at the 2001 census.

== Demographics ==
Historical population
Year	Pop.	±% p.a.
1831	117	—
1897	825	+3.00%
1926	1,171	+1.22%
1939	1,213	+0.27%
1959	771	−2.24%
1970	944	+1.86%
1979	964	+0.23%
2001	1,150	+0.81%
2011	1,229	+0.67%
