= Pachystolini =

Scientific classification
- Domain: Eukaryota
- Kingdom: Animalia
- Phylum: Arthropoda
- Class: Insecta
- Order: Coleoptera
- Suborder: Polyphaga
- Infraorder: Cucujiformia
- Family: Cerambycidae
- Subfamily: Lamiinae
- Tribe: Pachystolini; Aurivillius, 1922

Tribe of beetles

Pachystolini is a tribe of longhorn beetles of the subfamily Lamiinae. It was described by Per Olof Christopher Aurivillius in 1922.

== Taxonomy ==
- Cyclotaenia Jordan, 1903
- Falshomelix Breuning, 1956
- Gymnostylus Aurivillius, 1916
- Hypsideres Jordan, 1903
- Hypsideroides Breuning, 1938
- Macrochia Jordan, 1903
- Mallonia Thomson, 1857
- Orica Pascoe, 1888
- Pachystola Reiche, 1850
- Paracyclotaenia Breuning, 1935
- Paratragon Téocchi & Sudre, 2002
- Peloconus Jordan, 1906
- Spodotaenia Fairmaire, 1884
- Synhomelix Kolbe, 1893
- Tragon Murray, 1871
