= Paratragon tragonoides =

Scientific classification
- Kingdom: Animalia
- Phylum: Arthropoda
- Class: Insecta
- Order: Coleoptera
- Suborder: Polyphaga
- Infraorder: Cucujiformia
- Family: Cerambycidae
- Genus: Paratragon
- Species: P. tragonoides

Binomial name
- Paratragon tragonoides (Lepesme, 1953)

Synonyms
- Poimenesperus tragonoides Lepesme, 1953; Tragon tragonoides (Lepesme) Téocchi, 1984; Tragon tragonoides m. onorei Téocchi, 1984

Species of beetle

Paratragon tragonoides is a species of beetle in the family Cerambycidae. It was described by Lepesme in 1953, originally under the genus Poimenesperus.
