= Homelix decussata =

Scientific classification
- Domain: Eukaryota
- Kingdom: Animalia
- Phylum: Arthropoda
- Class: Insecta
- Order: Coleoptera
- Suborder: Polyphaga
- Infraorder: Cucujiformia
- Family: Cerambycidae
- Genus: Homelix
- Species: H. decussata

Binomial name
- Homelix decussata (Chevrolat, 1856)

Synonyms
- Homelix decussatus m. inornatus Téocchi & Sudre, 2003; Pachystola decussata Chevrolat, 1856; Homelix decussatus (Chevrolat, 1856) (misspelling); Hypomelix decussatus (Chevrolat, 1856) (misspelling)

Species of beetle

Homelix decussata is a species of beetle in the family Cerambycidae. It was described by Louis Alexandre Auguste Chevrolat in 1856, originally under the genus Pachystola. It is known from Nigeria, the Ivory Coast, Cameroon, and the Republic of the Congo. It feeds on Coffea canephora.
