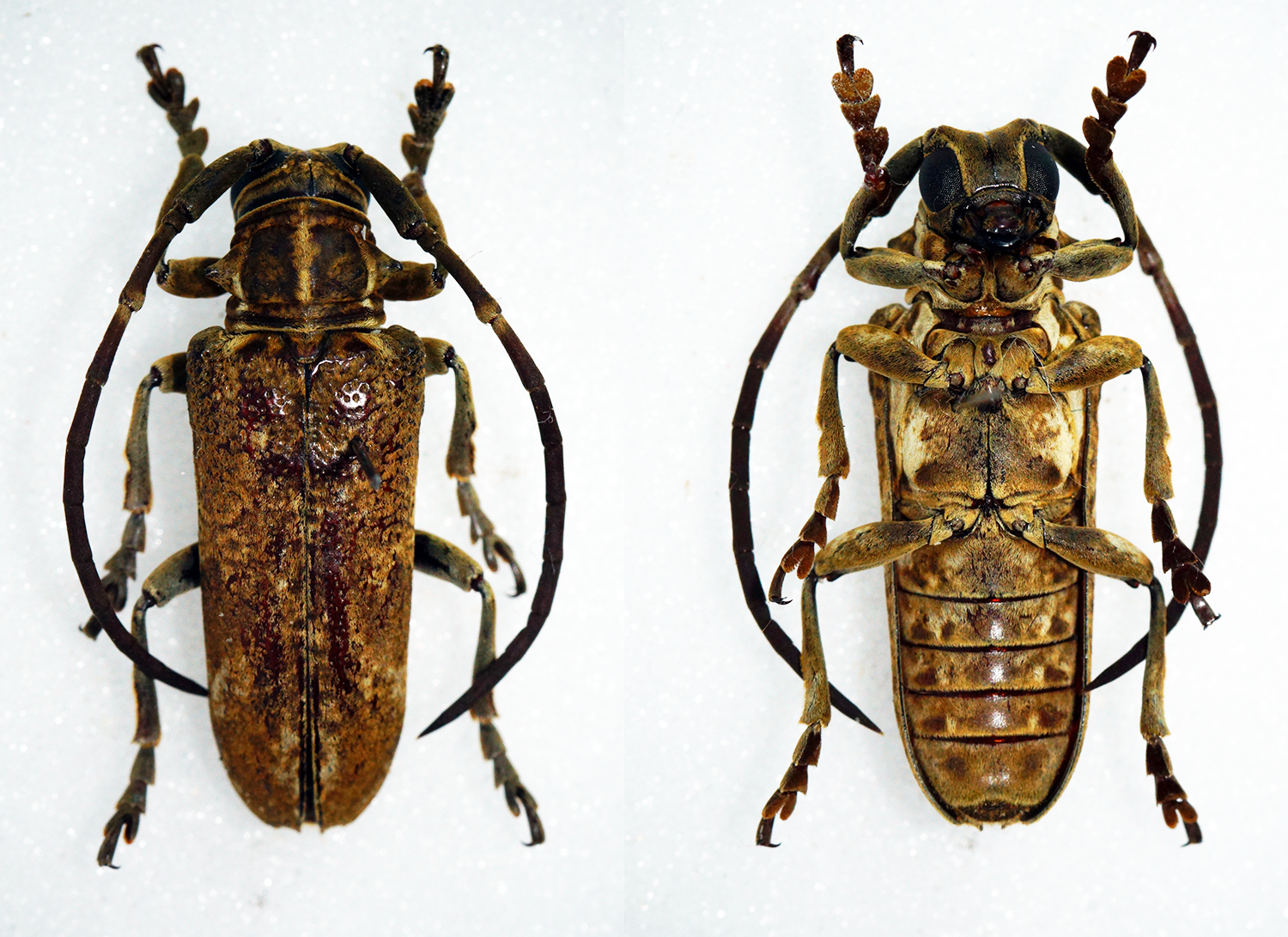

Scientific classification
- Kingdom: Animalia
- Phylum: Arthropoda
- Class: Insecta
- Order: Coleoptera
- Suborder: Polyphaga
- Infraorder: Cucujiformia
- Family: Cerambycidae
- Genus: Synhomelix
- Species: S. annulicornis

Binomial name
- Synhomelix annulicornis (Chevrolat, 1855)

Synonyms
- Synhomelix lateralis Kolbe, 1893; Pachystola annulicornis Chevrolat, 1855

= Synhomelix annulicornis =

Species of beetle

Synhomelix annulicornis is a species of beetle in the family Cerambycidae. It was described by Chevrolat in 1855, originally under the genus Pachystola. It has a wide distribution in Africa.
