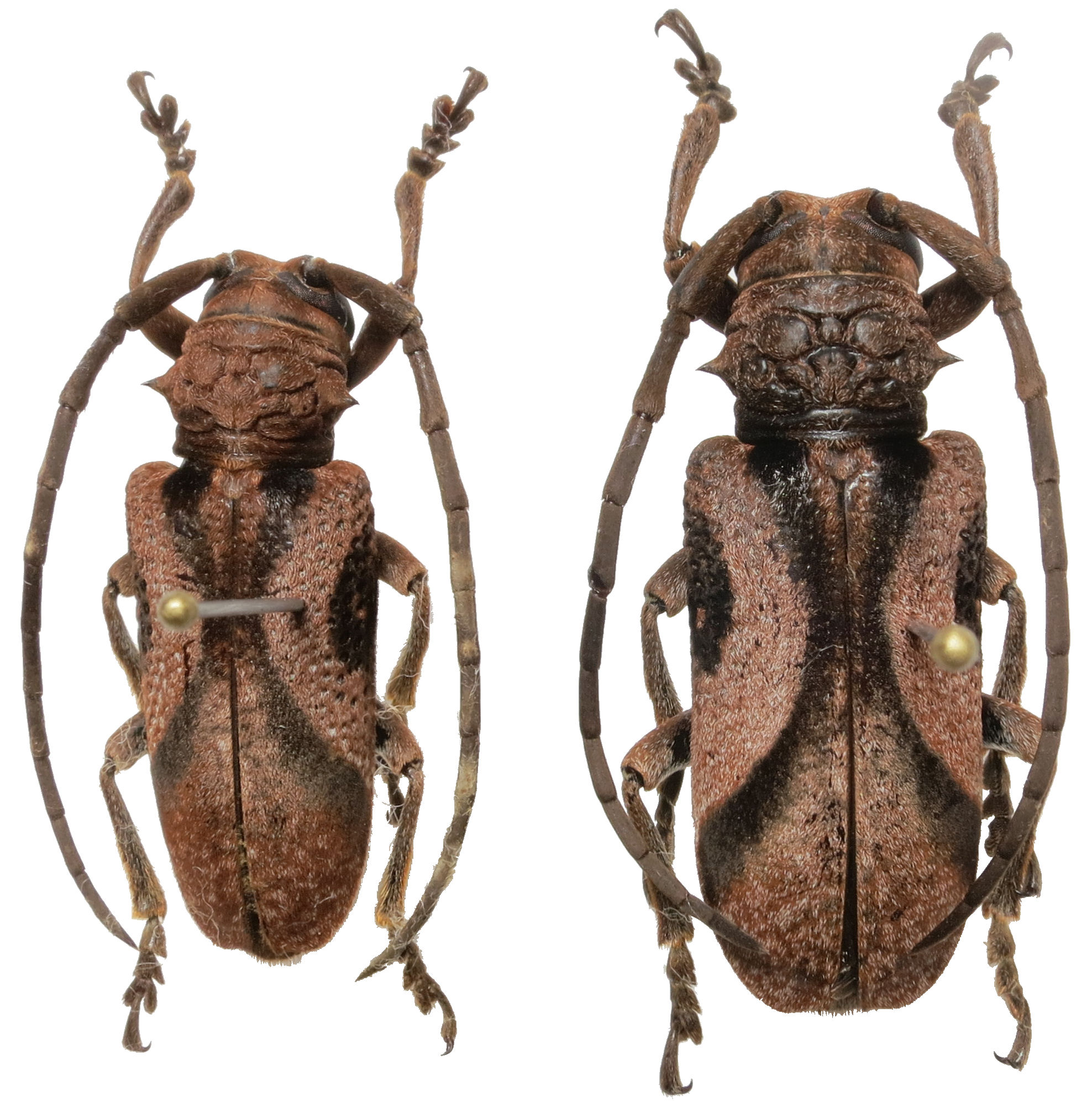

Scientific classification
- Domain: Eukaryota
- Kingdom: Animalia
- Phylum: Arthropoda
- Class: Insecta
- Order: Coleoptera
- Suborder: Polyphaga
- Infraorder: Cucujiformia
- Family: Cerambycidae
- Genus: Homelix
- Species: H. arcuata

Binomial name
- Homelix arcuata (Chevrolat, 1855)

Synonyms
- Pachystola arcuata Chevrolat, 1855; Homelix arcuatus (Chevrolat, 1855) (misspelling)

= Homelix arcuata =

Species of beetle

Homelix arcuata is a species of beetle in the family Cerambycidae. It was described by Louis Alexandre Auguste Chevrolat in 1855, originally under the genus Pachystola. It is known from Gabon, Cameroon, and Nigeria.
