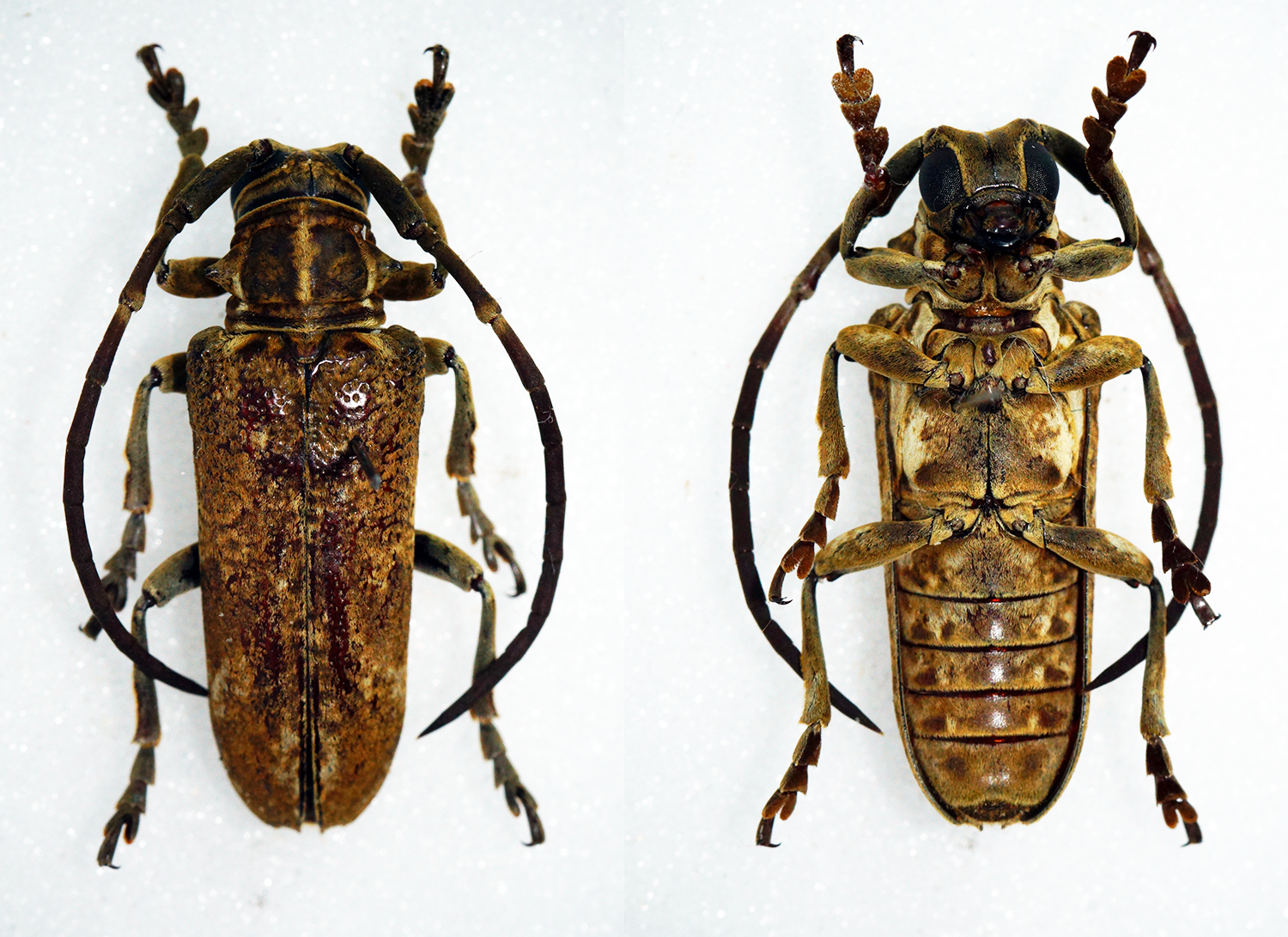
- Synhomelix annulicornis (female)

Scientific classification
- Kingdom: Animalia
- Phylum: Arthropoda
- Class: Insecta
- Order: Coleoptera
- Suborder: Polyphaga
- Infraorder: Cucujiformia
- Family: Cerambycidae
- Tribe: Pachystolini
- Genus: Synhomelix

= Synhomelix =

Genus of beetles

Synhomelix is a genus of longhorn beetles of the subfamily Lamiinae, containing the following species:

- Synhomelix annulicornis (Chevrolat, 1855)
- Synhomelix kivuensis Breuning, 1956
