= Pachystola fuliginosa =

Scientific classification
- Kingdom: Animalia
- Phylum: Arthropoda
- Class: Insecta
- Order: Coleoptera
- Suborder: Polyphaga
- Infraorder: Cucujiformia
- Family: Cerambycidae
- Genus: Pachystola
- Species: P. fuliginosa

Binomial name
- Pachystola fuliginosa Chevrolat, 1858

Species of beetle

Pachystola fuliginosa is a species of beetle in the family Cerambycidae. It was described by Chevrolat in 1858. It is known from Nigeria.
