= Mallonia pauper =

Scientific classification
- Kingdom: Animalia
- Phylum: Arthropoda
- Class: Insecta
- Order: Coleoptera
- Suborder: Polyphaga
- Infraorder: Cucujiformia
- Family: Cerambycidae
- Genus: Mallonia
- Species: M. pauper

Binomial name
- Mallonia pauper Jordan, 1903

Species of beetle

Mallonia pauper is a species of beetle in the family Cerambycidae. It was described by Karl Jordan in 1903. It is known from Angola.
