= Homelix cruciata =

Scientific classification
- Kingdom: Animalia
- Phylum: Arthropoda
- Class: Insecta
- Order: Coleoptera
- Suborder: Polyphaga
- Infraorder: Cucujiformia
- Family: Cerambycidae
- Genus: Homelix
- Species: H. cruciata

Binomial name
- Homelix cruciata Breuning, 1937

Synonyms
- Homelix cruciatus Breuning, 1937 (misspelling)

Species of beetle

Homelix cruciata is a species of beetle in the family Cerambycidae. It was described by Stephan von Breuning in 1937, originally misspelled as "Homelix cruciatus". It is known from Uganda.
