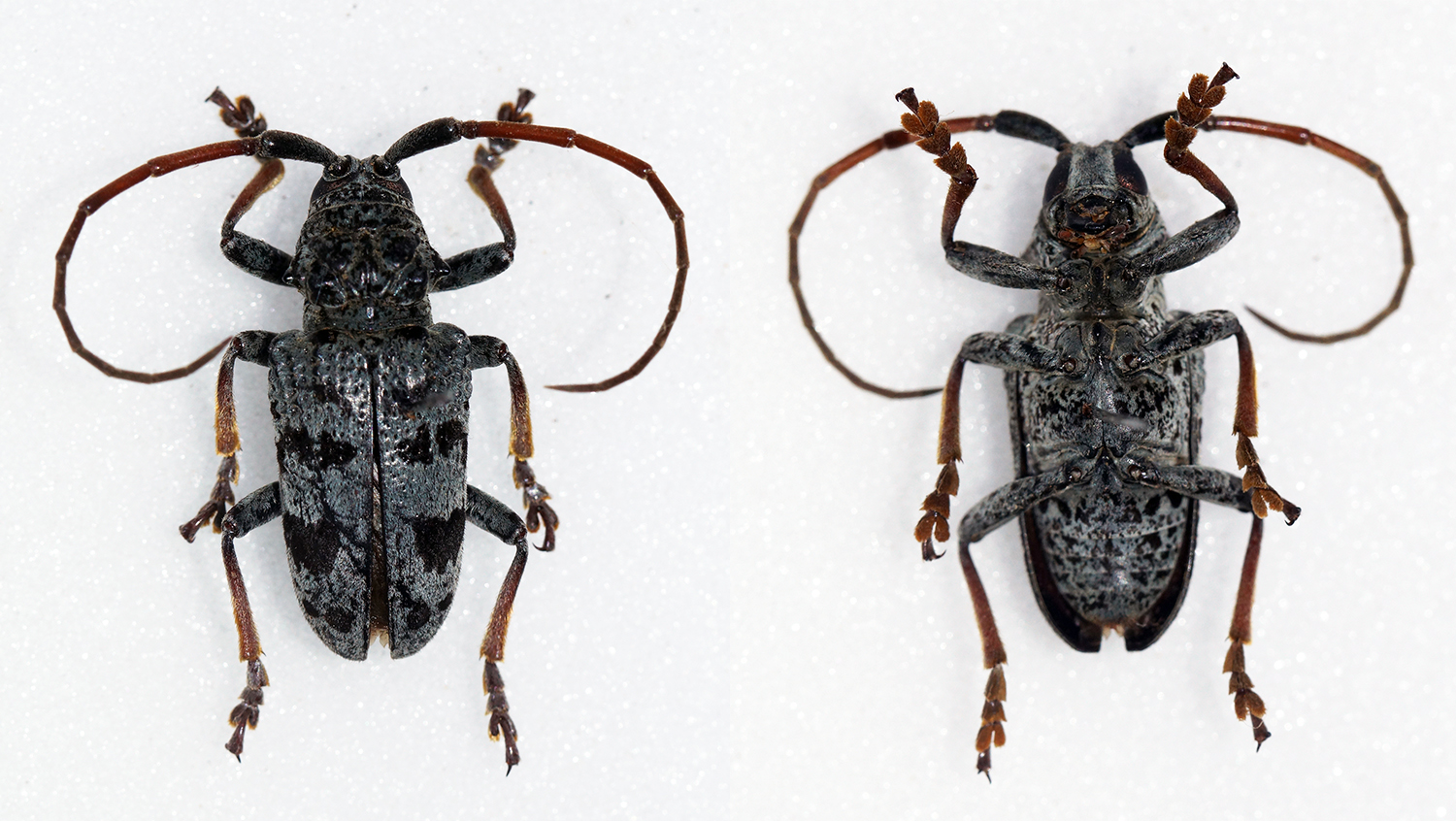

Scientific classification
- Kingdom: Animalia
- Phylum: Arthropoda
- Class: Insecta
- Order: Coleoptera
- Suborder: Polyphaga
- Infraorder: Cucujiformia
- Family: Cerambycidae
- Genus: Tragon
- Species: T. signaticornis

Binomial name
- Tragon signaticornis (Chevrolat, 1855)

Synonyms
- Pachystola fallax Lameere, 1893; Coniesthes nigrofasciata Kolbe, 1893; Tragocephala signaticornis Chevrolat, 1855

= Tragon signaticornis =

Species of beetle

Tragon signaticornis is a species of beetle in the family Cerambycidae. It was described by Chevrolat in 1855. It is known from Nigeria, Ghana, Senegal, Cameroon, Sierra Leone, the Ivory Coast, and Togo.
