= Gymnostylus signatus =

Scientific classification
- Kingdom: Animalia
- Phylum: Arthropoda
- Class: Insecta
- Order: Coleoptera
- Suborder: Polyphaga
- Infraorder: Cucujiformia
- Family: Cerambycidae
- Genus: Gymnostylus
- Species: G. signatus

Binomial name
- Gymnostylus signatus Aurivillius, 1916

Synonyms
- Gymnostylus signatus m. jadoti Teocchi, 1998; Gymnostylus signatus m. rousseti Teocchi, 1998

Species of beetle

Gymnostylus signatus is a species of beetle in the family Cerambycidae. It was described by Per Olof Christopher Aurivillius in 1916. It is known from Ivory Coast, Cameroon, and the Democratic Republic of the Congo.
