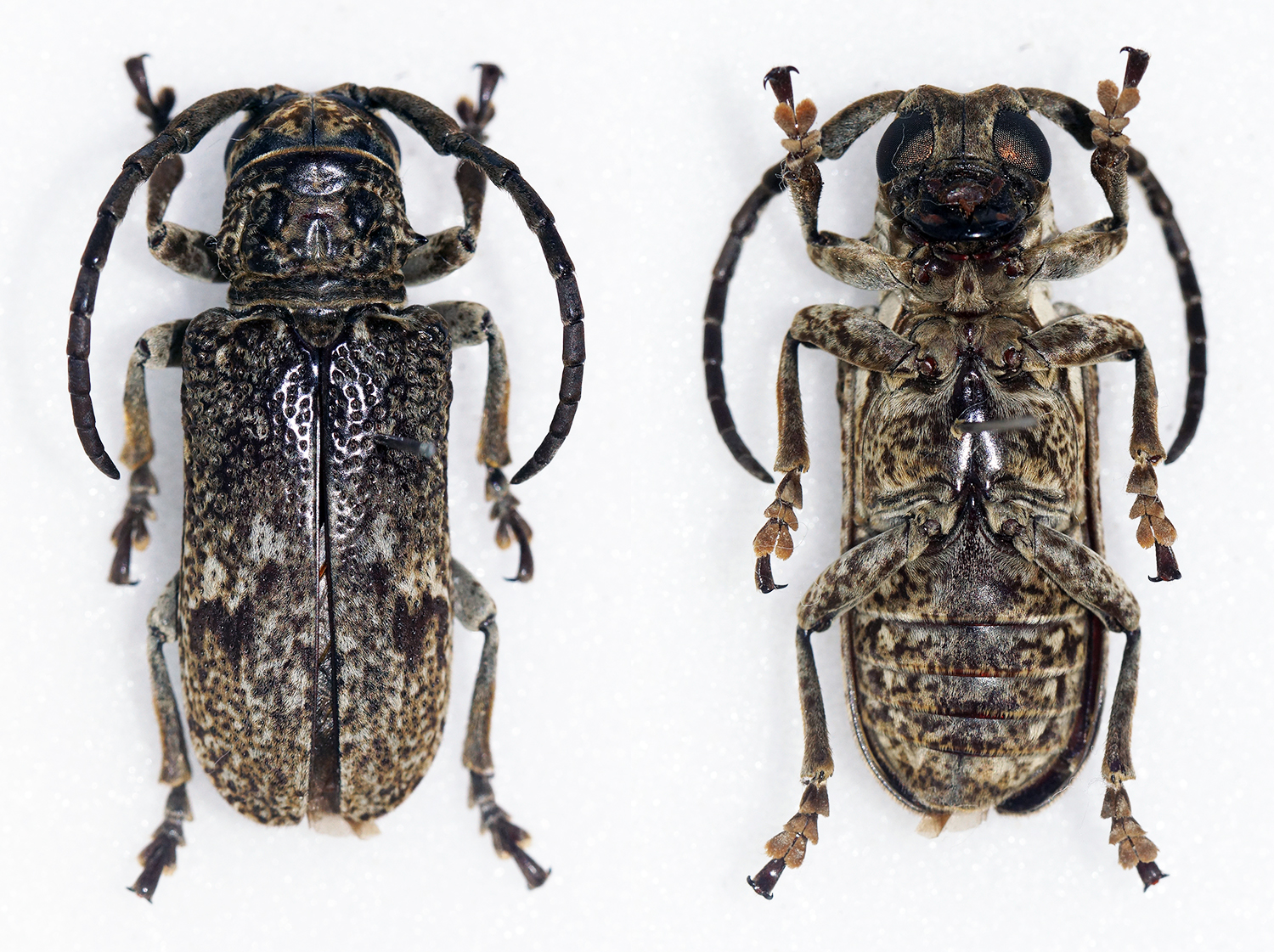

Scientific classification
- Domain: Eukaryota
- Kingdom: Animalia
- Phylum: Arthropoda
- Class: Insecta
- Order: Coleoptera
- Suborder: Polyphaga
- Infraorder: Cucujiformia
- Family: Cerambycidae
- Genus: Homelix
- Species: H. cribratipennis

Binomial name
- Homelix cribratipennis Thomson, 1858

Synonyms
- Homelix fahroei Pascoe, 1875; Homelix marmorata Aurivillius, 1916

= Homelix cribratipennis =

Species of beetle

Homelix cribratipennis is a species of beetle in the family Cerambycidae. It was described by James Thomson in 1858. It is known from Tanzania, South Africa, Burundi, Cameroon, Rwanda, the Democratic Republic of the Congo, Gabon, the Ivory Coast, Angola, Malawi, Nigeria, the Republic of the Congo, Sierra Leone, Togo, the Central African Republic, Uganda, Ghana, and Zimbabwe.
