= Mallonia barbicornis =

Scientific classification
- Kingdom: Animalia
- Phylum: Arthropoda
- Clade: Pancrustacea
- Class: Insecta
- Order: Coleoptera
- Suborder: Polyphaga
- Infraorder: Cucujiformia
- Family: Cerambycidae
- Genus: Mallonia
- Species: M. barbicornis

Binomial name
- Mallonia barbicornis (Fabricius, 1798)

Synonyms
- Lamia barbicornis Fabricius, 1798; Mastigocera barbicornis (Fabricius, 1798)

Species of beetle

Mallonia barbicornis is a species of beetle in the family Cerambycidae. It was described by Johan Christian Fabricius in 1798. It is known from Ghana, Benin, the Ivory Coast, and Guinea.
