= Poimenesperus phrynetoides =

Scientific classification
- Kingdom: Animalia
- Phylum: Arthropoda
- Class: Insecta
- Order: Coleoptera
- Suborder: Polyphaga
- Infraorder: Cucujiformia
- Family: Cerambycidae
- Genus: Poimenesperus
- Species: P. phrynetoides

Binomial name
- Poimenesperus phrynetoides Jordan, 1894

Species of beetle

Poimenesperus phrynetoides is a species of beetle in the family Cerambycidae. It was described by Karl Jordan in 1894.
