= Paratragon =

Scientific classification
- Kingdom: Animalia
- Phylum: Arthropoda
- Class: Insecta
- Order: Coleoptera
- Suborder: Polyphaga
- Infraorder: Cucujiformia
- Family: Cerambycidae
- Tribe: Pachystolini
- Genus: Paratragon

Genus of beetles

Paratragon is a genus of longhorn beetles of the subfamily Lamiinae, containing the following species:

- Paratragon jadoti Téocchi & Sudre, 2002
- Paratragon tragonoides (Lepesme, 1953)
