= Poimenesperus incubus =

Scientific classification
- Kingdom: Animalia
- Phylum: Arthropoda
- Class: Insecta
- Order: Coleoptera
- Suborder: Polyphaga
- Infraorder: Cucujiformia
- Family: Cerambycidae
- Genus: Poimenesperus
- Species: P. incubus

Binomial name
- Poimenesperus incubus Thomson, 1858

Synonyms
- Poemenesperus incubus (Thomson) Gemminger & Harlod, 1873; Poimenesperus voluptuosus (Thomson) Jordan, 1903

Species of beetle

Poimenesperus incubus is a species of beetle in the family Cerambycidae. It was described by James Thomson in 1858.
