= Pachystola granulipennis =

Scientific classification
- Kingdom: Animalia
- Phylum: Arthropoda
- Class: Insecta
- Order: Coleoptera
- Suborder: Polyphaga
- Infraorder: Cucujiformia
- Family: Cerambycidae
- Genus: Pachystola
- Species: P. granulipennis

Binomial name
- Pachystola granulipennis Breuning, 1971

Species of beetle

Pachystola granulipennis is a species of beetle in the family Cerambycidae. It was described by Stephan von Breuning in 1971.
