= Poimenesperus velutinus =

Scientific classification
- Kingdom: Animalia
- Phylum: Arthropoda
- Class: Insecta
- Order: Coleoptera
- Suborder: Polyphaga
- Infraorder: Cucujiformia
- Family: Cerambycidae
- Genus: Poimenesperus
- Species: P. velutinus

Binomial name
- Poimenesperus velutinus (White, 1858)

Synonyms
- Phryneta velutina White, 1858

Species of beetle

Poimenesperus velutinus is a species of beetle in the family Cerambycidae. It was described by White in 1858, originally under the genus Phryneta.
