= Poimenesperus gillieri =

Scientific classification
- Kingdom: Animalia
- Phylum: Arthropoda
- Class: Insecta
- Order: Coleoptera
- Suborder: Polyphaga
- Infraorder: Cucujiformia
- Family: Cerambycidae
- Genus: Poimenesperus
- Species: P. gillieri

Binomial name
- Poimenesperus gillieri Villiers, 1959

Species of beetle

Poimenesperus gillieri is a species of beetle in the family Cerambycidae. It was described by Villiers in 1959.
