= Homelix morini =

Scientific classification
- Domain: Eukaryota
- Kingdom: Animalia
- Phylum: Arthropoda
- Class: Insecta
- Order: Coleoptera
- Suborder: Polyphaga
- Infraorder: Cucujiformia
- Family: Cerambycidae
- Genus: Homelix
- Species: H. morini

Binomial name
- Homelix morini Téocchi, 1999

Species of beetle

Homelix morini is a species of beetle in the family Cerambycidae. It was described by Pierre Téocchi in 1999. It is known from Cameroon, the Democratic Republic of the Congo, and the Central African Republic.
