= Poimenesperus dobraei =

Scientific classification
- Kingdom: Animalia
- Phylum: Arthropoda
- Class: Insecta
- Order: Coleoptera
- Suborder: Polyphaga
- Infraorder: Cucujiformia
- Family: Cerambycidae
- Genus: Poimenesperus
- Species: P. dobraei

Binomial name
- Poimenesperus dobraei (Waterhouse, 1881)

Synonyms
- Poimenesperus dobraei m. reducta Teocchi, 1993; Poemenesperus dobraei Waterhouse, 1881

Species of beetle

Poimenesperus dobraei is a species of beetle in the family Cerambycidae. It was described by Waterhouse in 1881, originally under the genus Poemenesperus.
