= Homelix vittata =

Scientific classification
- Domain: Eukaryota
- Kingdom: Animalia
- Phylum: Arthropoda
- Class: Insecta
- Order: Coleoptera
- Suborder: Polyphaga
- Infraorder: Cucujiformia
- Family: Cerambycidae
- Genus: Homelix
- Species: H. vittata

Binomial name
- Homelix vittata Aurivillius, 1914

Synonyms
- Homelix vittatus Aurivillius, 1914 (misspelling)

Species of beetle

Homelix vittata is a species of beetle in the family Cerambycidae. It was described by Per Olof Christopher Aurivillius in 1914, originally misspelled as "Homelix vittatus". It is known from Sierra Leone and the Ivory Coast.
