= Poimenesperus zebra =

Scientific classification
- Kingdom: Animalia
- Phylum: Arthropoda
- Class: Insecta
- Order: Coleoptera
- Suborder: Polyphaga
- Infraorder: Cucujiformia
- Family: Cerambycidae
- Genus: Poimenesperus
- Species: P. zebra

Binomial name
- Poimenesperus zebra Fiedler, 1939

Species of beetle

Poimenesperus zebra is a species of beetle in the family Cerambycidae. It was described by Fiedler in 1939.
