= Tragon pulcher =

Scientific classification
- Kingdom: Animalia
- Phylum: Arthropoda
- Class: Insecta
- Order: Coleoptera
- Suborder: Polyphaga
- Infraorder: Cucujiformia
- Family: Cerambycidae
- Genus: Tragon
- Species: T. pulcher

Binomial name
- Tragon pulcher Breuning, 1942

Species of beetle

Tragon pulcher is a species of beetle in the family Cerambycidae. It was described by Stephan von Breuning in 1942.
