= Gymnostylus latifrons =

Scientific classification
- Kingdom: Animalia
- Phylum: Arthropoda
- Class: Insecta
- Order: Coleoptera
- Suborder: Polyphaga
- Infraorder: Cucujiformia
- Family: Cerambycidae
- Genus: Gymnostylus
- Species: G. latifrons

Binomial name
- Gymnostylus latifrons Breuning, 1970

Species of beetle

Gymnostylus latifrons is a species of beetle in the family Cerambycidae. It was described by Stephan von Breuning in 1970. It is known from the Central African Republic, Cameroon, and the Democratic Republic of the Congo.
