= Gymnostylus =

Scientific classification
- Kingdom: Animalia
- Phylum: Arthropoda
- Class: Insecta
- Order: Coleoptera
- Suborder: Polyphaga
- Infraorder: Cucujiformia
- Family: Cerambycidae
- Tribe: Pachystolini
- Genus: Gymnostylus

Genus of beetles

Gymnostylus is a genus of longhorn beetles of the subfamily Lamiinae, containing the following species:

- Gymnostylus latifrons Breuning, 1970
- Gymnostylus signatus Aurivillius, 1916
