= Tragon mimicus =

Scientific classification
- Kingdom: Animalia
- Phylum: Arthropoda
- Class: Insecta
- Order: Coleoptera
- Suborder: Polyphaga
- Infraorder: Cucujiformia
- Family: Cerambycidae
- Genus: Tragon
- Species: T. mimicus

Binomial name
- Tragon mimicus (Bates, 1890)

Species of beetle

Tragon mimicus is a species of beetle in the family Cerambycidae. It was described by Henry Walter Bates in 1890. It is known from the Democratic Republic of the Congo, Cameroon, and Gabon.

== Subspecies ==
- Tragon mimicus tibialis (Jordan, 1894)
- Tragon mimicus mimicus (Bates, 1890)
