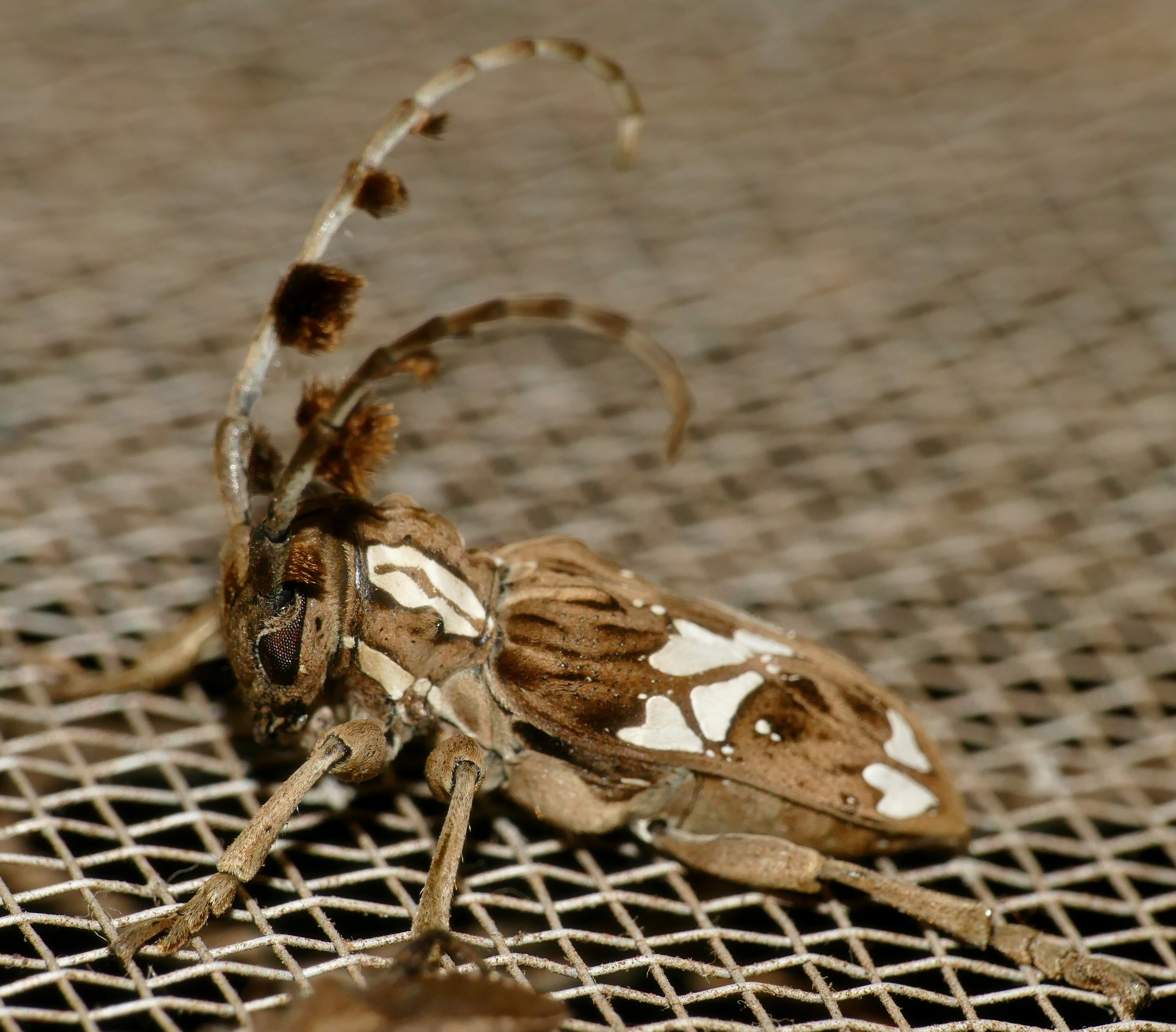

Scientific classification
- Kingdom: Animalia
- Phylum: Arthropoda
- Class: Insecta
- Order: Coleoptera
- Suborder: Polyphaga
- Infraorder: Cucujiformia
- Family: Cerambycidae
- Genus: Mallonia
- Species: M. albosignata

Binomial name
- Mallonia albosignata Chevrolat, 1858

= Mallonia albosignata =

Species of beetle

Mallonia albosignata is a species of beetle in the family Cerambycidae. It was described by Louis Alexandre Auguste Chevrolat in 1858. It is known from Mozambique, South Africa, Namibia, Botswana, and Zimbabwe.
