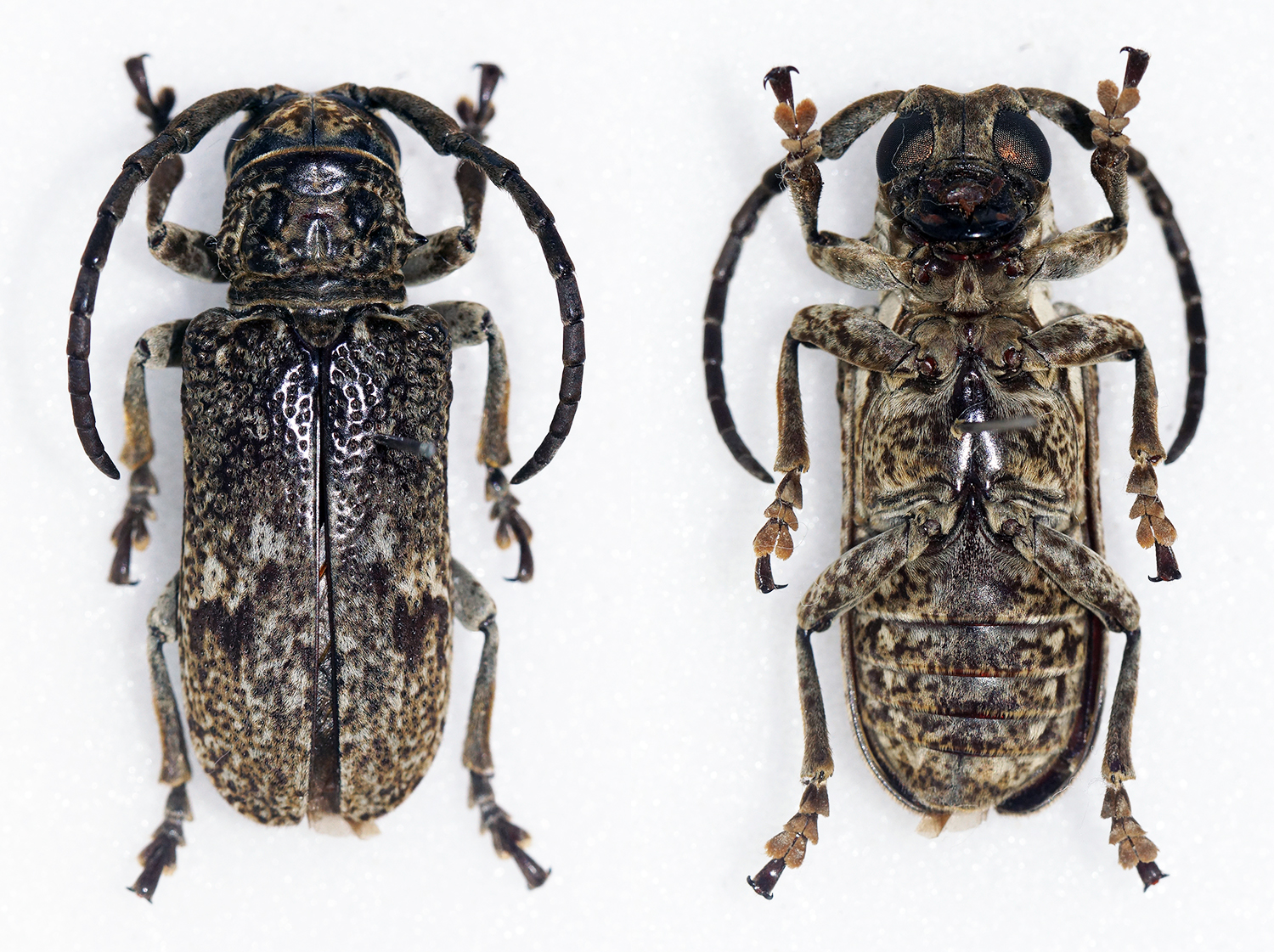
- Homelix cribratipennis

Scientific classification
- Domain: Eukaryota
- Kingdom: Animalia
- Phylum: Arthropoda
- Class: Insecta
- Order: Coleoptera
- Suborder: Polyphaga
- Infraorder: Cucujiformia
- Family: Cerambycidae
- Subfamily: Lamiinae
- Genus: Homelix

= Homelix =

Genus of beetles

Homelix is a genus of longhorn beetles of the subfamily Lamiinae, containing the following species:

subgenus Homelix

- Homelix annuligera Aurivillius, 1914
- Homelix arcuata (Chevrolat, 1855)
- Homelix cribratipennis Thomson, 1858
- Homelix cruciata Breuning, 1937
- Homelix liturata (Quedenfeldt, 1882)
- Homelix morini Téocchi, 1999
- Homelix variegata Jordan, 1894

subgenus Hypomelix

- Homelix albofasciata Thomson, 1858
- Homelix decussata (Chevrolat, 1856)

subgenus Monotylus

- Homelix klingi (Kolbe, 1893)
- Homelix vittata Aurivillius, 1914
