= Poimenesperus lugens =

Scientific classification
- Kingdom: Animalia
- Phylum: Arthropoda
- Class: Insecta
- Order: Coleoptera
- Suborder: Polyphaga
- Infraorder: Cucujiformia
- Family: Cerambycidae
- Genus: Poimenesperus
- Species: P. lugens

Binomial name
- Poimenesperus lugens (White, 1858)

Species of beetle

Poimenesperus lugens is a species of beetle in the family Cerambycidae. It was described by White in 1858.
