= Homelix albofasciata =

Scientific classification
- Domain: Eukaryota
- Kingdom: Animalia
- Phylum: Arthropoda
- Class: Insecta
- Order: Coleoptera
- Suborder: Polyphaga
- Infraorder: Cucujiformia
- Family: Cerambycidae
- Genus: Homelix
- Species: H. albofasciata

Binomial name
- Homelix albofasciata Thomson, 1858

Synonyms
- Homelix albo-fasciata Thomson, 1858; Homelix albofasciatus Thomson, 1858 (misspelling)

Species of beetle

Homelix albofasciata is a species of beetle in the family Cerambycidae. It was described by James Thomson in 1858, originally spelled as "Homelix albo-fasciata". It is known from Gabon.
