= Poimenesperus carreti =

Scientific classification
- Kingdom: Animalia
- Phylum: Arthropoda
- Class: Insecta
- Order: Coleoptera
- Suborder: Polyphaga
- Infraorder: Cucujiformia
- Family: Cerambycidae
- Genus: Poimenesperus
- Species: P. carreti

Binomial name
- Poimenesperus carreti Lisle, 1955

Species of beetle

Poimenesperus carreti is a species of beetle in the family Cerambycidae. It was described by Lisle in 1955.
