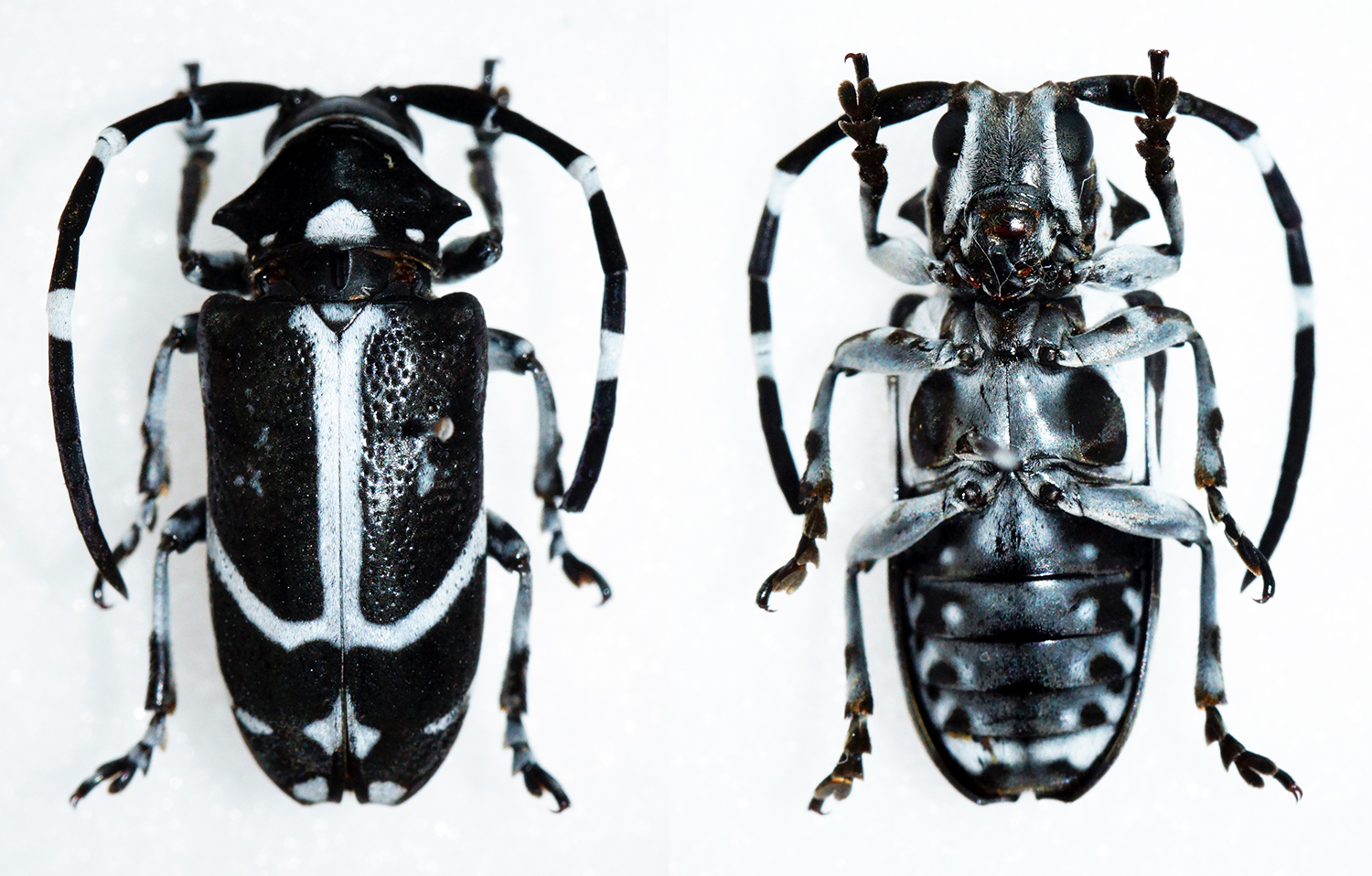

Scientific classification
- Kingdom: Animalia
- Phylum: Arthropoda
- Class: Insecta
- Order: Coleoptera
- Suborder: Polyphaga
- Infraorder: Cucujiformia
- Family: Cerambycidae
- Genus: Poimenesperus
- Species: P. ligatus

Binomial name
- Poimenesperus ligatus Jordan, 1894

= Poimenesperus ligatus =

Species of beetle

Poimenesperus ligatus is a species of beetle in the family Cerambycidae. It was described by Karl Jordan in 1894. It is known from the Democratic Republic of the Congo, Cameroon, Gabon, and Equatorial Guinea.
