= Poimenesperus nigrosignatus =

Scientific classification
- Kingdom: Animalia
- Phylum: Arthropoda
- Class: Insecta
- Order: Coleoptera
- Suborder: Polyphaga
- Infraorder: Cucujiformia
- Family: Cerambycidae
- Genus: Poimenesperus
- Species: P. nigrosignatus

Binomial name
- Poimenesperus nigrosignatus Breuning, 1947

Species of beetle

Poimenesperus nigrosignatus is a species of beetle in the family Cerambycidae. It was described by Stephan von Breuning in 1947.
