= Homelix annuligera =

Scientific classification
- Domain: Eukaryota
- Kingdom: Animalia
- Phylum: Arthropoda
- Class: Insecta
- Order: Coleoptera
- Suborder: Polyphaga
- Infraorder: Cucujiformia
- Family: Cerambycidae
- Genus: Homelix
- Species: H. annuligera

Binomial name
- Homelix annuligera Aurivillius, 1914

Synonyms
- Homelix annuliger Aurivillius, 1914 (misspelling)

Species of beetle

Homelix annuligera is a species of beetle in the family Cerambycidae. It was described by Per Olof Christopher Aurivillius in 1914, originally misspelled as "Homelix annuliger". It is known from Malawi.
