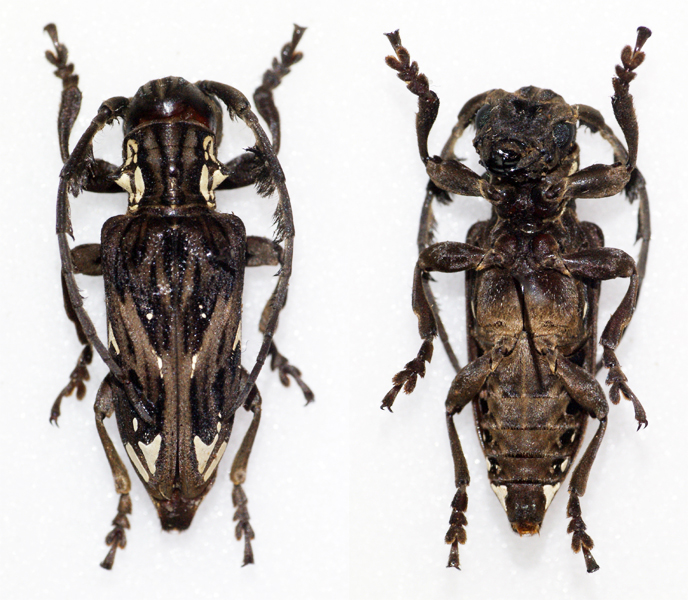
- Mallonia australis

Scientific classification
- Kingdom: Animalia
- Phylum: Arthropoda
- Class: Insecta
- Order: Coleoptera
- Suborder: Polyphaga
- Infraorder: Cucujiformia
- Family: Cerambycidae
- Tribe: Pachystolini
- Genus: Mallonia

= Mallonia =

Genus of beetles

Mallonia is a genus of longhorn beetles of the subfamily Lamiinae, containing the following species:

- Mallonia albosignata Chevrolat, 1858
- Mallonia australis Péringuey, 1888
- Mallonia barbicornis (Fabricius, 1798)
- Mallonia granulata Distant, 1892
- Mallonia orientalis Breuning, 1938
- Mallonia patricii Breuning, 1938
- Mallonia pauper Jordan, 1903
