= Poimenesperus fulvomarmoratus =

Scientific classification
- Kingdom: Animalia
- Phylum: Arthropoda
- Class: Insecta
- Order: Coleoptera
- Suborder: Polyphaga
- Infraorder: Cucujiformia
- Family: Cerambycidae
- Genus: Poimenesperus
- Species: P. fulvomarmoratus

Binomial name
- Poimenesperus fulvomarmoratus Jordan, 1894

Species of beetle

Poimenesperus fulvomarmoratus is a species of beetle in the family Cerambycidae. It was first described in 1894.
