= Pachystola erinacea =

Scientific classification
- Kingdom: Animalia
- Phylum: Arthropoda
- Class: Insecta
- Order: Coleoptera
- Suborder: Polyphaga
- Infraorder: Cucujiformia
- Family: Cerambycidae
- Genus: Pachystola
- Species: P. erinacea

Binomial name
- Pachystola erinacea Jordan, 1894

Synonyms
- Neopachystola erinacea (Jordan) Marinoni, 1977

Species of beetle

Pachystola erinacea is a species of beetle in the family Cerambycidae. It was described by Karl Jordan in 1894. It is found in Tanzania, Malawi, the Democratic Republic of the Congo, South Africa, Kenya, Zambia, Cameroon, and Zimbabwe.
