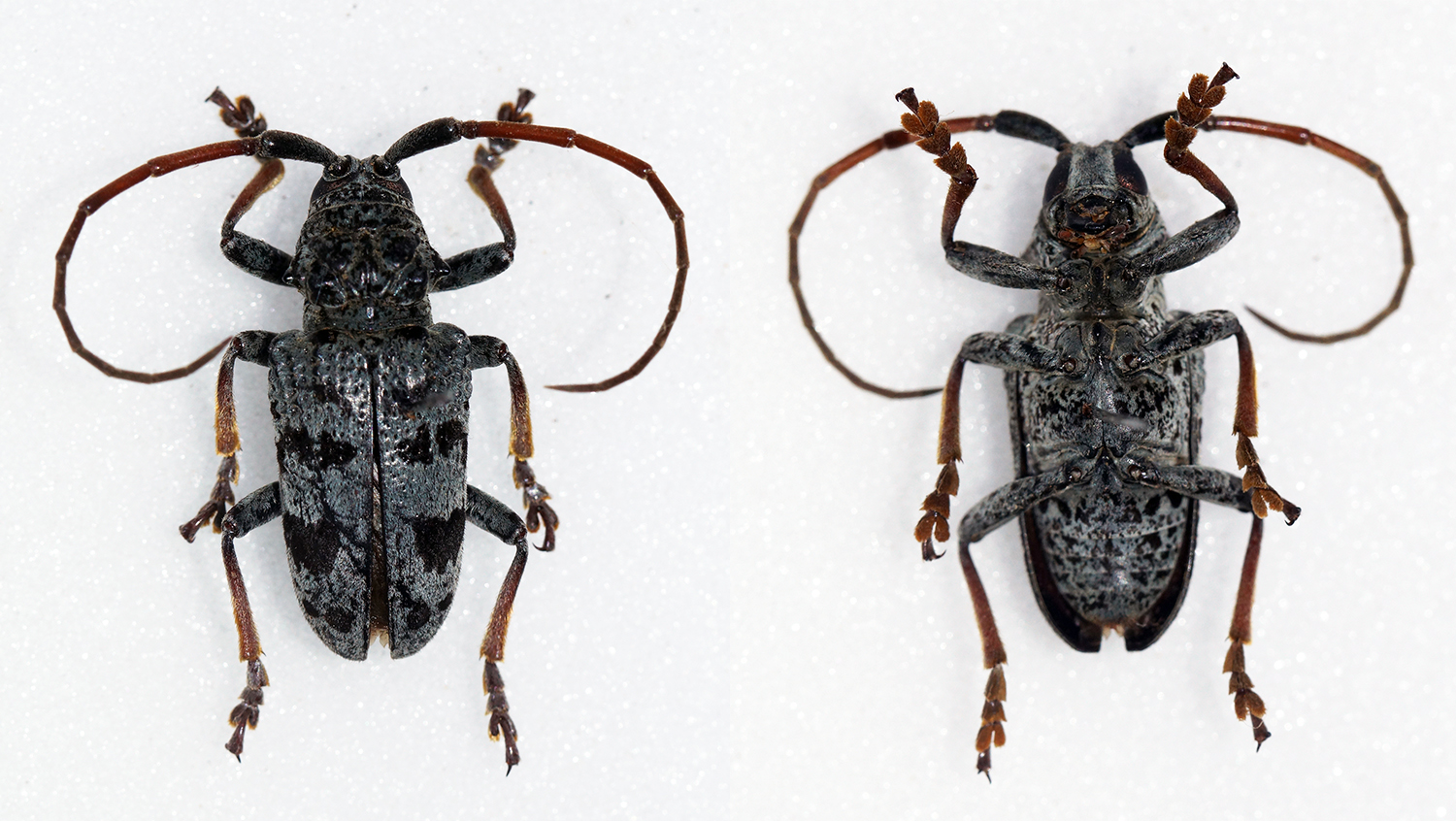
- Tragon signaticornis

Scientific classification
- Kingdom: Animalia
- Phylum: Arthropoda
- Clade: Pancrustacea
- Class: Insecta
- Order: Coleoptera
- Suborder: Polyphaga
- Infraorder: Cucujiformia
- Family: Cerambycidae
- Tribe: Pachystolini
- Genus: Tragon; Murray, 1871

= Tragon =

Genus of beetles

Tragon is a genus of longhorn beetles of the subfamily Lamiinae, containing the following species:

- Tragon lugens (White, 1858)
- Tragon mimicus (Bates, 1890)
- Tragon pulcher (Breuning, 1942
- Tragon signaticornis (Chevrolat, 1855)
- Tragon silaceoides (Lepesme, 1952
- Tragon suturalis (Pascoe, 1864)
