= Poimenesperus ochraceus =

Scientific classification
- Kingdom: Animalia
- Phylum: Arthropoda
- Class: Insecta
- Order: Coleoptera
- Suborder: Polyphaga
- Infraorder: Cucujiformia
- Family: Cerambycidae
- Genus: Poimenesperus
- Species: P. ochraceus

Binomial name
- Poimenesperus ochraceus Breuning, 1934

Species of beetle

Poimenesperus ochraceus is a species of beetle in the family Cerambycidae. It was described by Stephan von Breuning in 1934.
