= Homelix liturata =

Scientific classification
- Domain: Eukaryota
- Kingdom: Animalia
- Phylum: Arthropoda
- Class: Insecta
- Order: Coleoptera
- Suborder: Polyphaga
- Infraorder: Cucujiformia
- Family: Cerambycidae
- Genus: Homelix
- Species: H. liturata

Binomial name
- Homelix liturata (Quedenfeldt, 1882)

Synonyms
- Eurysops lituratus Quedenfeldt, 1882; Homelix scultithorax Kolbe, 1889; Homelix lituratus (Quedenfeldt, 1882) (misspelling); Homelix buqueti (Thomson)

Species of beetle

Homelix liturata is a species of beetle in the family Cerambycidae. It was described by Quedenfeldt in 1882. It is known from Tanzania, Angola, the Republic of the Congo, the Democratic Republic of the Congo, and possibly from the Ivory Coast.
