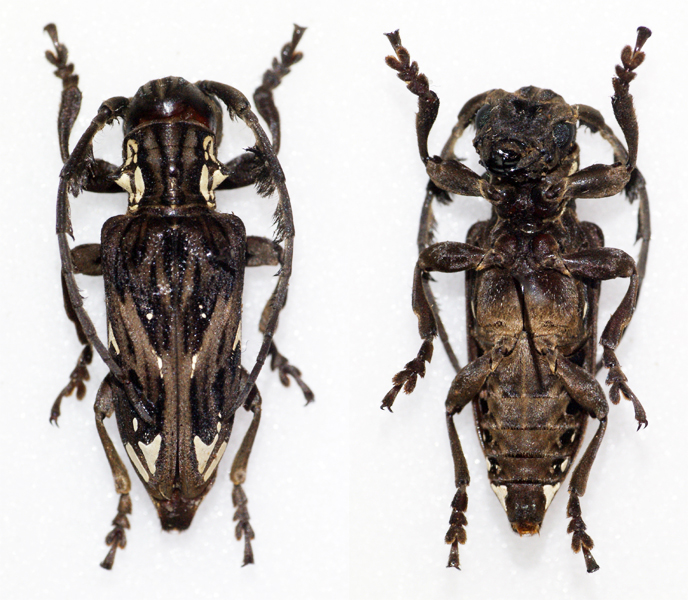

Scientific classification
- Kingdom: Animalia
- Phylum: Arthropoda
- Class: Insecta
- Order: Coleoptera
- Suborder: Polyphaga
- Infraorder: Cucujiformia
- Family: Cerambycidae
- Genus: Mallonia
- Species: M. australis

Binomial name
- Mallonia australis Péringuey, 1888

= Mallonia australis =

Species of beetle

Mallonia australis is a species of beetle in the family Cerambycidae. It was described by Péringuey in 1888. It is known from Zambia, Mozambique, and South Africa.
