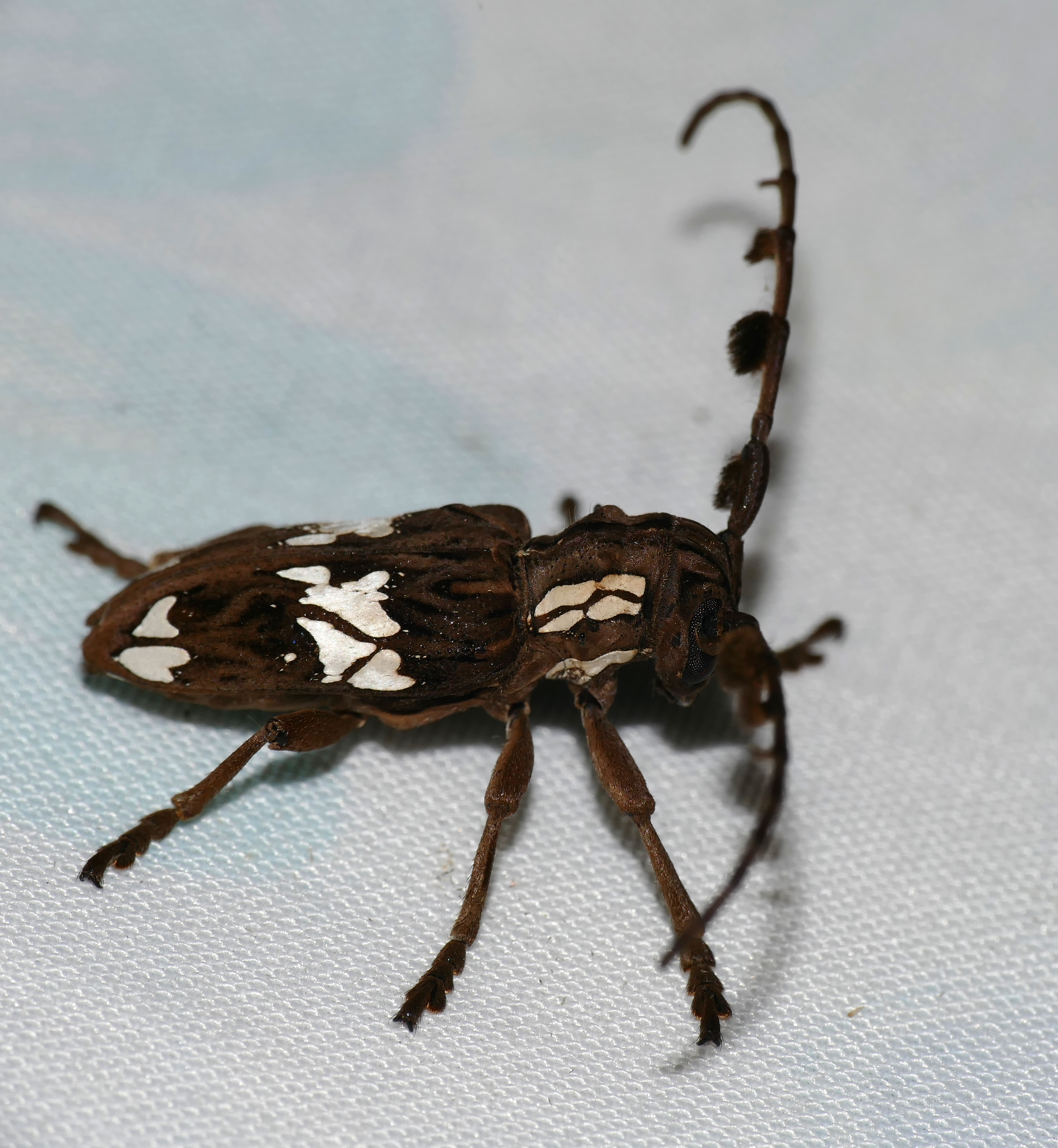

Scientific classification
- Kingdom: Animalia
- Phylum: Arthropoda
- Class: Insecta
- Order: Coleoptera
- Suborder: Polyphaga
- Infraorder: Cucujiformia
- Family: Cerambycidae
- Genus: Mallonia
- Species: M. granulata

Binomial name
- Mallonia granulata Distant, 1892

= Mallonia granulata =

Species of beetle

Mallonia granulata is a species of beetle in the family Cerambycidae. It was described by William Lucas Distant in 1892. It is known from South Africa.
