= Poimenesperus obliquus =

Scientific classification
- Kingdom: Animalia
- Phylum: Arthropoda
- Class: Insecta
- Order: Coleoptera
- Suborder: Polyphaga
- Infraorder: Cucujiformia
- Family: Cerambycidae
- Genus: Poimenesperus
- Species: P. obliquus

Binomial name
- Poimenesperus obliquus Aurivillius, 1916

Synonyms
- Poimenesperus ardoini Breuning, 1964

Species of beetle

Poimenesperus obliquus is a species of beetle in the family Cerambycidae. It was described by Per Olof Christopher Aurivillius in 1916. It is known from Cameroon.
