= Poimenesperus villiersi =

Scientific classification
- Kingdom: Animalia
- Phylum: Arthropoda
- Class: Insecta
- Order: Coleoptera
- Suborder: Polyphaga
- Infraorder: Cucujiformia
- Family: Cerambycidae
- Genus: Poimenesperus
- Species: P. villiersi

Binomial name
- Poimenesperus villiersi Lepesme, 1947

Species of beetle

Poimenesperus villiersi is a species of beetle in the family Cerambycidae. It was described by Lepesme in 1947.
