= Poimenesperus laetus =

Scientific classification
- Kingdom: Animalia
- Phylum: Arthropoda
- Class: Insecta
- Order: Coleoptera
- Suborder: Polyphaga
- Infraorder: Cucujiformia
- Family: Cerambycidae
- Genus: Poimenesperus
- Species: P. laetus

Binomial name
- Poimenesperus laetus Thomson, 1858

Synonyms
- Poimenesperus rubrosignatus Aurivillius, 1913; Poemenesperus laetus (Thomson) Gemminger & Harlod, 1873

Species of beetle

Poimenesperus laetus is a species of beetle in the family Cerambycidae. It was described by James Thomson in 1858. It is known from the Democratic Republic of the Congo, Cameroon, and Gabon.
