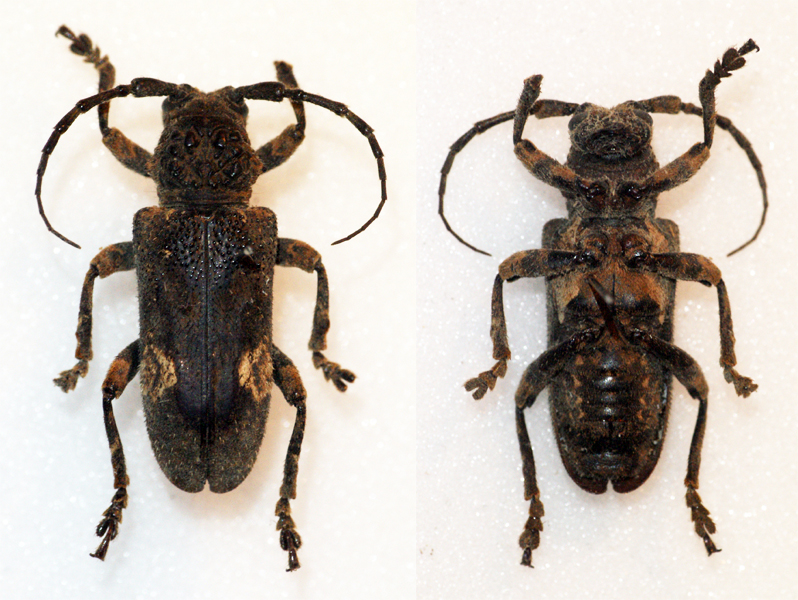
- Pachystola mamillata

Scientific classification
- Kingdom: Animalia
- Phylum: Arthropoda
- Class: Insecta
- Order: Coleoptera
- Suborder: Polyphaga
- Infraorder: Cucujiformia
- Family: Cerambycidae
- Genus: Pachystola
- Species: P. mamillata

Binomial name
- Pachystola mamillata (Dalman, 1817)

Synonyms
- Lamia mamillata Dalman, 1817; Pachystola lapidosa Thomson, 1858

= Pachystola mamillata =

Species of beetle

Pachystola mamillata is a species of beetle in the family Cerambycidae. It was described by Dalman in 1817, originally under the genus Lamia. It is known from the Ivory Coast, Cameroon, Sierra Leone, Gabon, Angola, the Republic of the Congo. It feeds on Coffea canephora.
