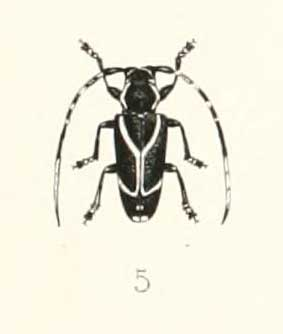

Scientific classification
- Kingdom: Animalia
- Phylum: Arthropoda
- Class: Insecta
- Order: Coleoptera
- Suborder: Polyphaga
- Infraorder: Cucujiformia
- Family: Cerambycidae
- Genus: Poimenesperus
- Species: P. thomsoni

Binomial name
- Poimenesperus thomsoni (Pascoe, 1869)

Synonyms
- Poemenesperus lyrifer Hintz, 1919; Nyctopais thomsoni Pascoe, 1869

= Poimenesperus thomsoni =

Species of beetle

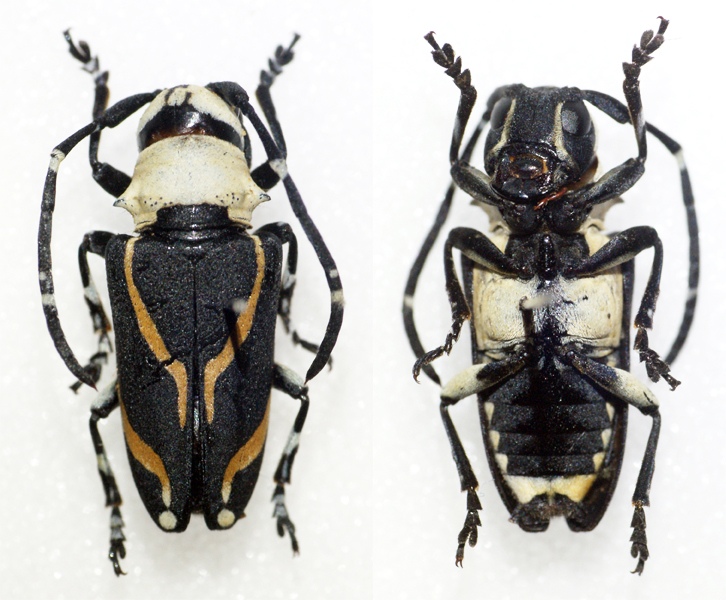
Poimenesperus thomsoni

Poimenesperus thomsoni is a species of beetle in the family Cerambycidae. It was described by Francis Polkinghorne Pascoe in 1869. It is known from the Democratic Republic of the Congo, Gabon, Cameroon, and Equatorial Guinea. It feeds on Xylopia aethiopica.

== Varietas ==
- Poimenesperus thomsoni var. strandi (Breuning, 1934)
- Poimenesperus thomsoni var. reductus Breuning, 1939
- Poimenesperus thomsoni var. alboreductus Breuning, 1950
- Poimenesperus thomsoni var. taeniatus Jordan, 1894
- Poimenesperus thomsoni var. nubilus Breuning, 1934
