= Homelix klingi =

Scientific classification
- Domain: Eukaryota
- Kingdom: Animalia
- Phylum: Arthropoda
- Class: Insecta
- Order: Coleoptera
- Suborder: Polyphaga
- Infraorder: Cucujiformia
- Family: Cerambycidae
- Genus: Homelix
- Species: H. klingi

Binomial name
- Homelix klingi (Kolbe, 1893)

Synonyms
- Monotylus flavescens Aurivillius, 1920; Monotylus klingi Kolbe, 1893; Monotylus ochraceosignatus Aurivillius, 1914

Species of beetle

Homelix klingi is a species of beetle in the family Cerambycidae. It was described by Kolbe in 1893. It is known from the Central African Republic, Sierra Leone, the Ivory Coast, Kenya, the Democratic Republic of the Congo, Mali, Tanzania, Cameroon, Togo, and Zambia.
