= Homelix variegata =

Scientific classification
- Domain: Eukaryota
- Kingdom: Animalia
- Phylum: Arthropoda
- Class: Insecta
- Order: Coleoptera
- Suborder: Polyphaga
- Infraorder: Cucujiformia
- Family: Cerambycidae
- Genus: Homelix
- Species: H. variegata

Binomial name
- Homelix variegata Jordan, 1894

Synonyms
- Homelix variegatus (Jordan) Aurivillius, 1921 (misspelling)

Species of beetle

Homelix variegata is a species of beetle in the family Cerambycidae. It was described by Karl Jordan in 1894. It is known from the Republic of the Congo, the Democratic Republic of the Congo, and Gabon. It feeds on Coffea canephora.
