= Poimenesperus voluptuosus =

Scientific classification
- Kingdom: Animalia
- Phylum: Arthropoda
- Class: Insecta
- Order: Coleoptera
- Suborder: Polyphaga
- Infraorder: Cucujiformia
- Family: Cerambycidae
- Genus: Poimenesperus
- Species: P. voluptuosus

Binomial name
- Poimenesperus voluptuosus Thomson, 1857

Synonyms
- Poemenesperus voluptuosus (Thomson) Gemminger & Harlod, 1873

Species of beetle

Poimenesperus voluptuosus is a species of beetle in the family Cerambycidae. It was described by James Thomson in 1857. It is known to be from South Africa.
