= Tragon suturalis =

Scientific classification
- Kingdom: Animalia
- Phylum: Arthropoda
- Class: Insecta
- Order: Coleoptera
- Suborder: Polyphaga
- Infraorder: Cucujiformia
- Family: Cerambycidae
- Genus: Tragon
- Species: T. suturalis

Binomial name
- Tragon suturalis (Pascoe, 1864)

Synonyms
- Phryneta suturalis Pascoe, 1864

Species of beetle

Tragon suturalis is a species of beetle in the family Cerambycidae. It was described by Francis Polkinghorne Pascoe in 1864.
