= Tragon lugens =

Scientific classification
- Kingdom: Animalia
- Phylum: Arthropoda
- Class: Insecta
- Order: Coleoptera
- Suborder: Polyphaga
- Infraorder: Cucujiformia
- Family: Cerambycidae
- Genus: Tragon
- Species: T. lugens

Binomial name
- Tragon lugens (White, 1858)

Synonyms
- Poimenesperus tragonoides (Lepesme) Téocchi, 1989; Poimenesperus lugens (White, 1858); Phryneta lugens White, 1858

Species of beetle

Tragon lugens is a species of beetle in the family Cerambycidae. It was described by White in 1858.
