= Macrochia =

Scientific classification
- Kingdom: Animalia
- Phylum: Arthropoda
- Class: Insecta
- Order: Coleoptera
- Suborder: Polyphaga
- Infraorder: Cucujiformia
- Family: Cerambycidae
- Genus: Macrochia; Jordan, 1903
- Species: M. texata

Binomial name
- Macrochia texata (Chevrolat, 1858)

Monotypic genus of beetles

Macrochia texata is a species of beetle in the family Cerambycidae, and the only species in the genus Macrochia. It was described by Louis Alexandre Auguste Chevrolat in 1858.
