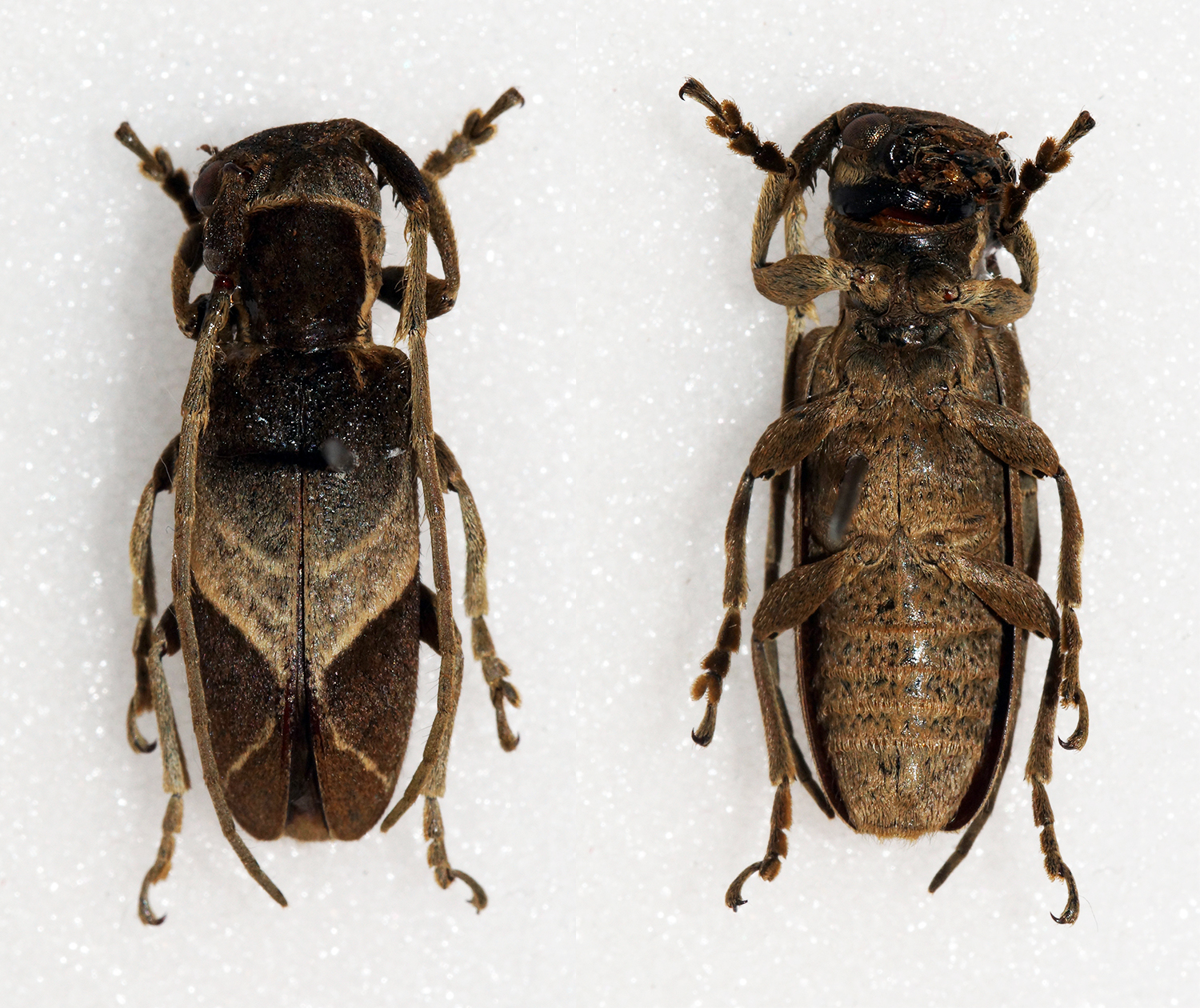

Scientific classification
- Kingdom: Animalia
- Phylum: Arthropoda
- Class: Insecta
- Order: Coleoptera
- Suborder: Polyphaga
- Infraorder: Cucujiformia
- Family: Cerambycidae
- Genus: Spodotaenia
- Species: S. basicornis

Binomial name
- Spodotaenia basicornis Fairmaire, 1884

= Spodotaenia =

Genus of beetles

Spodotaenia basicornis is a species of beetle in the family Cerambycidae, and the only species in the genus Spodotaenia. It was described by Fairmaire in 1884.
