= Peloconus =

Scientific classification
- Kingdom: Animalia
- Phylum: Arthropoda
- Class: Insecta
- Order: Coleoptera
- Suborder: Polyphaga
- Infraorder: Cucujiformia
- Family: Cerambycidae
- Genus: Peloconus
- Species: P. junodi

Binomial name
- Peloconus junodi Jordan, 1906

Genus of beetles

Peloconus junodi is a species of beetle in the family Cerambycidae, and the only species in the genus Peloconus. It was described by Karl Jordan in 1906.
