= Paracyclotaenia =

Scientific classification
- Kingdom: Animalia
- Phylum: Arthropoda
- Class: Insecta
- Order: Coleoptera
- Suborder: Polyphaga
- Infraorder: Cucujiformia
- Family: Cerambycidae
- Genus: Paracyclotaenia
- Species: P. strandi

Binomial name
- Paracyclotaenia strandi Breuning, 1935

Genus of beetles

Paracyclotaenia strandi is a species of beetle in the family Cerambycidae, and the only species in the genus Paracyclotaenia. It was described by Stephan von Breuning in 1935.
