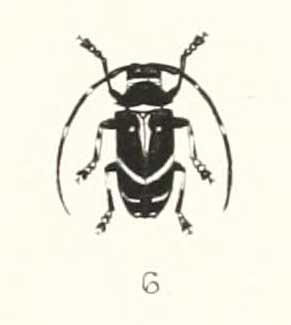
- Poimenesperus ligatus

Scientific classification
- Kingdom: Animalia
- Phylum: Arthropoda
- Class: Insecta
- Order: Coleoptera
- Suborder: Polyphaga
- Infraorder: Cucujiformia
- Family: Cerambycidae
- Tribe: Tragocephalini
- Genus: Poimenesperus

= Poimenesperus =

Genus of beetles

Poimenesperus is a genus of longhorn beetles of the subfamily Lamiinae, containing the following species:

subgenus Nyctesperus

- Poimenesperus niveicollis Aurivillius, 1903

subgenus Poimenesperus

- Poimenesperus albomaculatus Breuning, 1934
- Poimenesperus callimus Jordan, 1903
- Poimenesperus carreti Lisle, 1955
- Poimenesperus dobraei (Waterhouse, 1881)
- Poimenesperus fulvomarmoratus Jordan, 1894
- Poimenesperus gillieri Villiers, 1959
- Poimenesperus griseomarmoratus Breuning, 1934
- Poimenesperus holdhausi Breuning, 1934
- Poimenesperus imitans Breuning, 1934
- Poimenesperus incubus Thomson, 1858
- Poimenesperus laetus Thomson, 1858
- Poimenesperus ligatus Jordan, 1894
- Poimenesperus lugens (White, 1858)
- Poimenesperus marmoratus Jordan, 1894
- Poimenesperus nigrosignatus Breuning, 1947
- Poimenesperus nigrovelutinus Breuning, 1938
- Poimenesperus obliquus Aurivillius, 1916
- Poimenesperus ochraceus Breuning, 1934
- Poimenesperus phrynetoides Jordan, 1894
- Poimenesperus schoutedeni Breuning, 1934
- Poimenesperus tessmanni Hintz, 1919
- Poimenesperus thomsoni (Pascoe, 1869)
- Poimenesperus velutinus (White, 1858)
- Poimenesperus villiersi Lepesme, 1947
- Poimenesperus voluptuosus Thomson, 1857
- Poimenesperus zebra Fiedler, 1939
