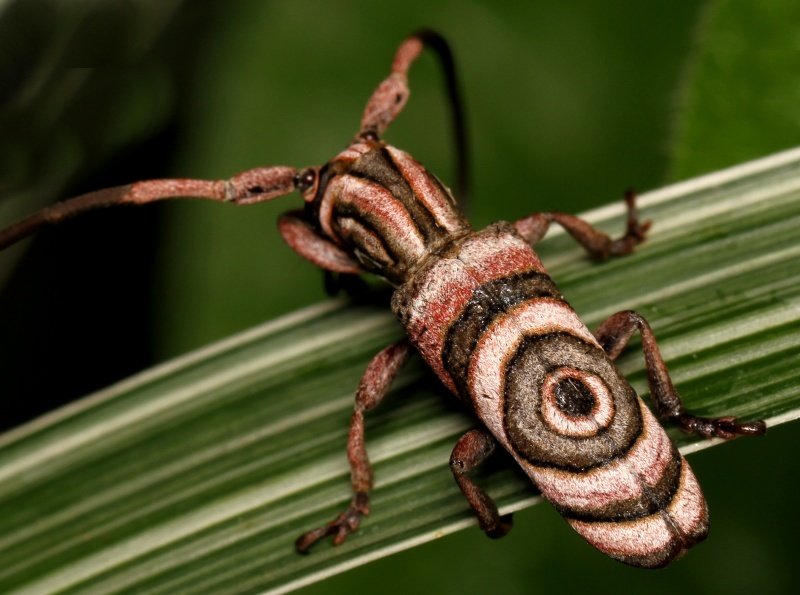

Scientific classification
- Kingdom: Animalia
- Phylum: Arthropoda
- Class: Insecta
- Order: Coleoptera
- Suborder: Polyphaga
- Infraorder: Cucujiformia
- Family: Cerambycidae
- Genus: Hypsideroides
- Species: H. junodi

Binomial name
- Hypsideroides junodi (Jordan, 1906)

= Hypsideroides =

Species of beetle

Hypsideroides junodi is a species of beetle in the family Cerambycidae, and the only species in the genus Hypsideroides. It was described by Karl Jordan in 1906.
