= Hypsideres =

Scientific classification
- Kingdom: Animalia
- Phylum: Arthropoda
- Class: Insecta
- Order: Coleoptera
- Suborder: Polyphaga
- Infraorder: Cucujiformia
- Family: Cerambycidae
- Genus: Hypsideres
- Species: H. curvinucha

Binomial name
- Hypsideres curvinucha Jordan, 1903

Genus of beetles

Hypsideres curvinucha is a species of beetle in the family Cerambycidae, and the only species in the genus Hypsideres. It was described by Karl Jordan in 1903.
