= Cyclotaenia =

Scientific classification
- Kingdom: Animalia
- Phylum: Arthropoda
- Class: Insecta
- Order: Coleoptera
- Suborder: Polyphaga
- Infraorder: Cucujiformia
- Family: Cerambycidae
- Genus: Cyclotaenia
- Species: C. discus

Binomial name
- Cyclotaenia discus Jordan, 1903

Genus of beetles

Cyclotaenia discus is a species of beetle in the family Cerambycidae, and the only species in the genus Cyclotaenia. It was described by the German entomologist Karl Jordan in 1903.

== Distribution ==
Cyclotaenia discus is found in many Central African countries like Cameroon, the Central African Republic, Gabon, Ivory Coast and Malawi.
