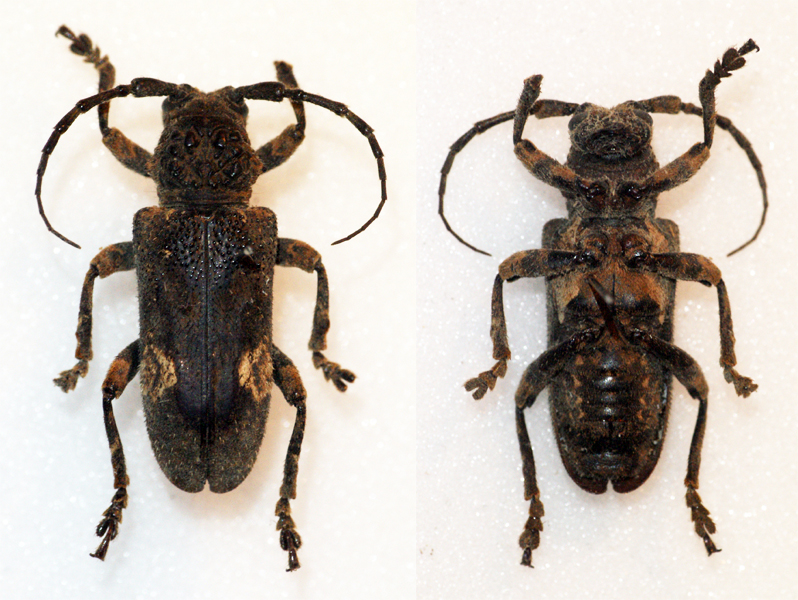
- Pachystola

Scientific classification
- Kingdom: Animalia
- Phylum: Arthropoda
- Class: Insecta
- Order: Coleoptera
- Suborder: Polyphaga
- Infraorder: Cucujiformia
- Family: Cerambycidae
- Tribe: Pachystolini
- Genus: Pachystola

= Pachystola =

Genus of beetles

Pachystola is a genus of longhorn beetles of the subfamily Lamiinae, containing the following species:

- Pachystola erinacea Jordan, 1894
- Pachystola fuliginosa Chevrolat, 1858
- Pachystola granulipennis Breuning, 1971
- Pachystola mamillata (Dalman, 1817)
