= Tonton =

Tonton may refer to:

== People ==
- Tonton David, David Grammont, French Reggae singer
- Tonton Gutierrez, Eduardo Antonio Winsett Gutierrez Jr., (born 1964), a Filipino film and television actor
- Tonton Landicho (born 1978), a Filipino actor
- Tonton Semakala (born 1975), a professional boxer from Sweden
- Tonton Susanto (born 1973), an Indonesian professional racing cyclist
- Tonton Zola Moukoko (born 1983), a Congolese footballer
- Washington "Tonton" Young, Filipino cartoonist known for Pupung daily comic strip

== Other uses ==
- tonton (video portal), a Malaysian video portal
- Tonton (spider), a genus of South American spiders
- The Tontons, an American band from Houston, Texas
- Tonton, a Muppet on Hikayat Simsim, a Jordanian version of Sesame Street
- Tonton Island, Indonesia, connected by the Barelang Bridge

== See also ==
- Ton (disambiguation)
- Tonson (surname)
- Tonton Macoute (disambiguation)
- Tauntaun, a fictional creature from the Star Wars films
- Ton-Taun, an American rock band from Pennsylvania
- Tonton Tapis–GB, a 1991 Belgian professional cycling team
