= Landicho =

Landicho is a surname derived from Minnan Chinese. Notable people with the surname include:

- Domingo G. Landicho (1939–2021), Filipino writer and academic
- Tonton Landicho (born 1978), Filipino actor
