= Dom =

Dom or DOM may refer to:

== People and fictional characters ==
- Dom (given name), including fictional characters
- Dom (surname)
- Dom La Nena (born 1989), stage name of Brazilian-born cellist, singer and songwriter Dominique Pinto
- Dom people, an ethnic group in the Middle East and North Africa
- Dom (caste) or Domba, an ethnic group in India

== Arts and entertainment ==
- Dom (film), a 1958 Polish film
- DOM (album), a 2012 album by German singer Joachim Witt
- DOM (band), a pop/electronic solo musical project by Dominic Cournoyer
- "Dom", a song by Doda (featuring Bedoes) from Aquaria, 2022

== Linguistics ==
- Differential object marking, a linguistic feature
- Dom language, spoken in Papua New Guinea

== Places ==
- Dom (mountain), Switzerland, the third highest mountain in the Alps
- Overseas department, (Département d'outre-mer), a department of France that is outside metropolitan France
- Dóm Square, a large town square in Szeged, Hungary
- Dominican Republic (ISO 3166-1 country code)
- Douglas–Charles Airport (IATA airport code), Dominica
- Dominion of Melchizedek, a micronation known largely for facilitating large scale banking fraud in many parts of the world

=== Buildings ===
- Dom Tower of Utrecht, a tower in Utrecht, the Netherlands
- Dom-Hotel, a five-star hotel in Cologne, Germany
- D.O.M. (restaurant), a restaurant in São Paulo, Brazil

== Science and technology ==
- Digital optical monitoring, a function in a Small Form-factor Pluggable transceiver
- 2,5-Dimethoxy-4-methylamphetamine or DOM/STP, a psychedelic phenethylamine
- Dioctyl maleate, a chemical compound used in the manufacture of surfactants
- Directed ortho metalation, a chemical reaction mechanism
- Disk-on-a-module, an alternative to traditional computer hard disk drives
- Dissolved organic matter, a central nutrient in aquatic ecosystems
- Document Object Model, a cross-platform and language-independent application programming interface
- $\operatorname{dom}$, the domain of a function

== Other uses ==
- Dom (church), cognate with the Italian term duomo, meaning a collegiate church or cathedral
- Dom (title), a title of respect, derived from the Latin Dominus
- Deo optimo maximo, abbreviated D.O.M., Latin for "to the Greatest and Best God", originally Jove, later the Christian God
- Dóm, Old English word meaning "judgment", "law"; see Anglo-Saxon law
- Days on market, how many days since a piece of real estate was listed for sale
- Drawn-over-mandrel, a class of manufactured tubing
- Dominant partner, in BDSM

== See also ==
- Dom Dom (disambiguation)
- Doma (disambiguation)
- Domm (disambiguation)
