= Dondon (disambiguation) =

Dondon is a town in Haiti.

Dondon may also refer to:

- Dondon (footballer), Antônio de Paula Filho (1912–1993), Brazilian footballer famous by the samba "Tempos de Dondon"
- Anyuy River (Khabarovsk Krai), also known as the Dondon, a tributary of the Amur River in Russia
- Stéphane Dondon (born 1977), a French basketball player
- Dondon Ampalayo (born 1963), a Filipino retired basketball player
- Dondon Hontiveros (born 1977), a Filipino basketball player

== See also ==
- Domdom (disambiguation)
- Tondon (disambiguation)
- Don't Don, an album by Korean boy band Super Junior
