= Domm =

Domm may refer to:

== People ==
- Bill Domm (1930–2000), Member of Parliament in the House of Commons of Canada
- Mario Domm (born 1977), Mexican singer, songwriter and record producer
- Rosa Domm (born 1998), German politician

== Other uses ==
- Domm (film), 2026 Bangladeshi film
- DOMM, days on market–MLS in real estate
- Dòmm, the Lombard name for Domodossola, Italy

== See also ==
- Dom (disambiguation)
