= Dom Dom (disambiguation) =

Dom Dom or Domdom may refer to:

- Dom Dom, a Japanese fast food restaurant
- Mount Dom Dom, Victoria, Australia
- Dum Dum, known in Bengali as Dômdôm, a populated municipality near north Kolkata, India
- Dimdim Castle, known in Persian as Domdom, a Kurdish fortress in Iran
- Domdoms, fictional creatures in the 1986 arcade game Toy Pop
- Dominik Mysterio, professional wrestler

== See also ==
- Dom (disambiguation)
- Dum Dum (disambiguation)
- Dondon (disambiguation)
