= Najmadeen Mala =

Najmadin Mala
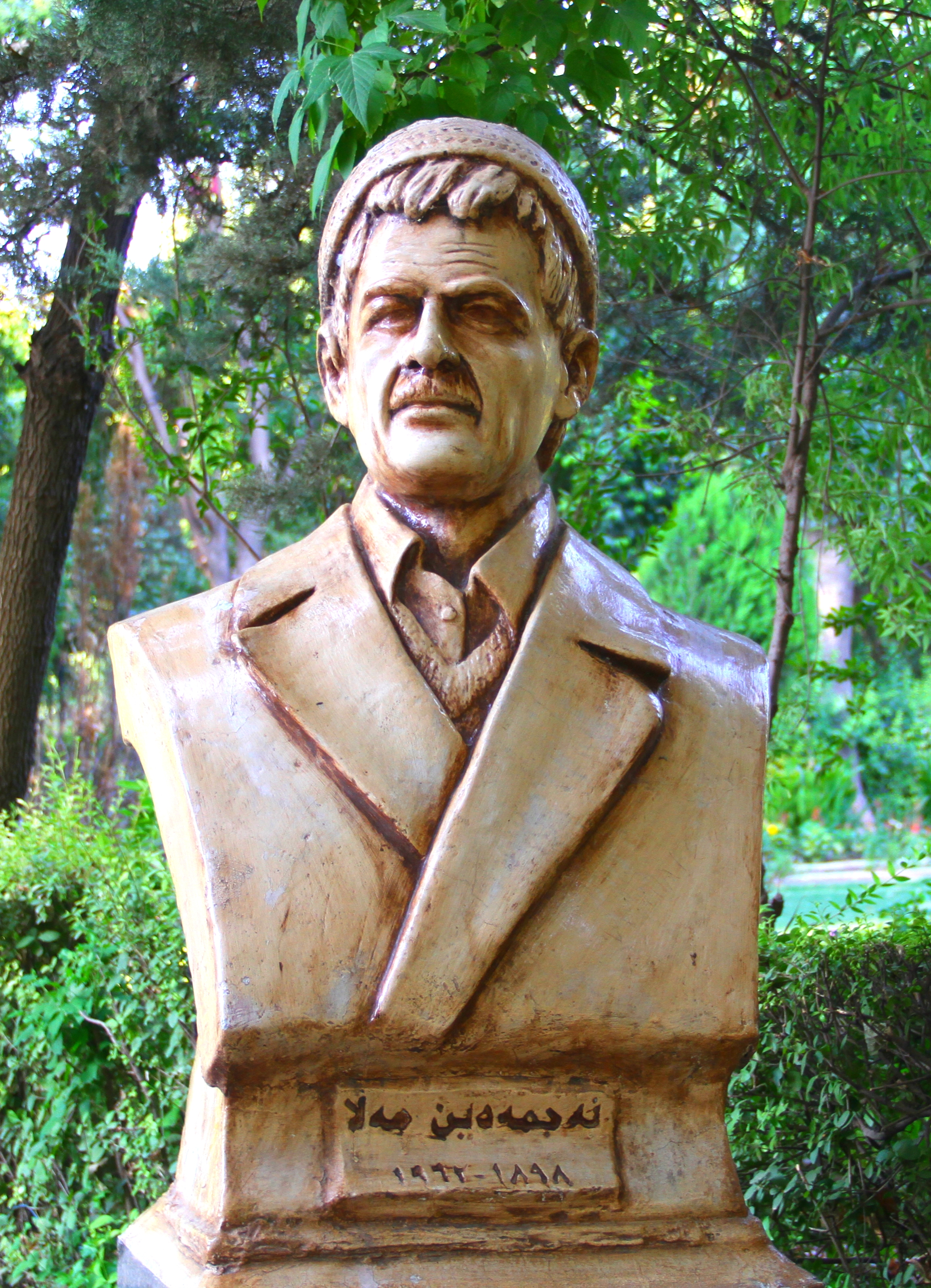
- A bust of Najmadin Mala in Iraqi Kurdistan
- Born: 1898; Sulaymaniyah, Ottoman Empire
- Died: 23 April 1962 (aged 63–64); Sulaymaniyah, Iraq
- Occupations: Writer, teacher, journalist
- Writing career
- Period: 20th century

Najmadin Mala (1898 in Sulaymaniyah – 23 April 1962 in Sulaymaniyah) was a Kurdish writer, journalist and teacher. Najmadin was the son of Mullah Ghafur Mullah Ali. He worked in Ranya but moved to Halab in Syria.

Later, he returned to Sulaimani and founded a school, which he ran for 40 years. He also owned a book store.

== Literary career ==
He had a weekly column called "Child Story" in the newspaper Zheen. He wrote biographies on notable figures and poets. He published more than 90 stories, most of them folkloric.

He wrote several valuable works on Kurdish history and also Kurdish language literature in Sorani dialect. Najmadin Mala died on 23 April 1962, and was buried on Azmar Mountain in Sulaimani.
