= Dum Dum (disambiguation) =

Dum Dum is a city in West Bengal, India.

Dum Dum or Dum Dums may also refer to:

== Places ==
- Dum Dum Lok Sabha constituency, for Dum Dum, West Bengal, India
- Dum Dum Assembly constituency, for Dum Dum, West Bengal, India
- Dum Dum Uttar Assembly constituency, for Dum Dum, West Bengal, India
- Netaji Subhas Chandra Bose International Airport, formerly known as Dum Dum Airport
- Dum Dum metro station, on the Kolkata metro
- Dumdum, Kaimur, village in Bihar, India

== Arts and entertainment ==
=== Fictional characters ===
- the supporting character in 1962 cartoon Touché Turtle and Dum Dum
- Dum Dum Dugan, a fictional character in Marvel Comics

=== Music ===
- Dum-Dum (album), by The Vaselines, 1989
- Dum Dum (album), by Ekatarina Velika, 1991
- "Dum Dum" (song), by Brenda Lee, 1961
- "Dum Dum", a song by Cheryl from the 2012 album A Million Lights
- "Dum Dum", a 2023 song by Gin Lee
- Dumdums (band), a British guitar-pop band 1997–2001
- Dumdum (musical instrument), a one-string bass from Zimbabwe
- Dum-Dum (rapper) (1969–2023), Brazilian rapper and composer, member of Facção Central

== Other uses ==
- Dum Dums, American confectionery
- Dumdum bullet or dum-dum, an expanding bullet

== See also ==
- Dom Dom (disambiguation)
- Dumb Dumb (disambiguation)
- Dum Dum Arsenal, a British India Army facility
- Dum Dum Girls, an American rock band
- Dum Dum Junction railway station, in Kolkata, India
- "Dum Dum Dede", a song by Nazia Hassan from the 1983 album Young Tarang
- North Dum Dum, city and municipality in West Bengal
- South Dum Dum, city and municipality in West Bengal
- Stupidity
