= 1969 Palanca Awards =

Philippine literary award

19th Palanca Awards

The 19th Don Carlos Palanca Memorial Awards for Literature was held to commemorate the memory of Don Carlos Palanca Sr. through an endeavor that would promote education and culture in the country.

LIST OF WINNERS

The 1969 winners, the nineteenth recipients of the awards, were divided into six categories, open only to English and Filipino [Tagalog] short story, poetry, and one-act play:

== English Division ==
=== Short Story ===
- First Prize: Edith L. Tiempo, “Un Bel Di”
- Second Prize: Luis Teodoro Jr., “The Trial of Professor Riesco”
- Third Prize: Antonio R. Enriquez, “The Icon”

=== Poetry ===
- First Prize: Federico Licsi Espino Jr., “Counter-clockwise: Poems 1965-1969 and Dark Sutra”
- Second Prize: Artemio Tadena, “Northward Into Noon”
- Third Prize: Jose M. Lansang Jr., “Black or Otherwise”

=== One-Act Play ===
- First Prize: Nestor Torre Jr., “Dialogue”
- Second Prize: Jesus T. Peralta, “Days of the Clock”
- Third Prize: Mar V. Puatu, “The Summit”

== Filipino Division ==
=== Maikling Kwento ===
- First Prize: Ricardo Lee, “Huwag, Huwag Mong Kukuwentuhan Ang Batang Si Wei Fung”
- Second Prize: Eli Ang Barroso, “Mariang Makiling”
- Third Prize: Domingo Landicho, “Elias at Salome”

=== Tula ===
- First Prize: Aniceto Silvestre, “May Luha ang Tula”
- Second Prize: Jose M. Buhain, “Paraanin Ako”
- Third Prize: Celestino M. Vega, “Walong Tukod Langit”

=== Dulang May Isang Yugto ===
- First Prize: Rogelio Sicat, “Moses, Moses”
- Second Prize: Clodualdo Del Mundo, “Neon”
- Third Prize: Fernando L. Samonte, “Ang Huling Pasiya”

== Sources ==
- "The Don Carlos Palanca Memorial Awards for Literature | Winners 1969". Archived from the original on 2009-10-22.
