= Moukoko =

Moukoko or Mukoko is a surname of Cameroonian origin. Notable people with the surname include:

- Pierre Moukoko Mbonjo (born 1954), Cameroonian politician
- Tonton Zola Moukoko (born 1983), Swedish footballer
- Youssoufa Moukoko (born 2004), German footballer
- Dieumerci Mukoko Amale (born 1998), Congolese footballer
- Jestina Mukoko, Zimbabwean human rights activist
- Daniel Mukoko Samba (born 1959), Congolese politician
- Mukoko Batezadio (born 1992), Congolese footballer
- Mukoko Tonombe (born 1996), Congolese footballer
