= Doma =

Doma or DOMA may refer to:

== Places ==
- Domah, a mandal in Ranga Reddy district, Andhra Pradesh, India
- Doma, Nigeria, a local government in Nasarawa State, Nigeria
- Duma, Nablus, a Palestinian town in the West Bank
- Doma Cathedral, a cathedral in Riga, Latvia

== People ==
- Doma Wang, Indian chef

== Other uses ==
- Defense of Marriage Act (DOMA), a 1996 American federal law
- 3,4-Dihydroxymandelic acid, a metabolite of norepinephrine
- Dom (caste), also Doma or Domba, an ethnic group in India
  - Dom people, an ethnic group in the Middle East descendants of the above
    - Domari language, their Indo-Aryan language
- Vadoma, an ethnic group of Zimbabwe
- TV Doma in Slovakia
- Doma TV in Croatia
- Hyphaene or Doma, genus of palms
- Doma, the lower earthen floor of a Japanese minka
- Domain-Oriented Microservice Architecture is a software design approach

== See also ==
- Dom (disambiguation)
- Dome (disambiguation)
