= Tenson =

Tenson may refer to:

- Tenso, a style of troubadour song
- Tenson (brand), a brand of clothing based in Sweden
- Tenson Shrine (天孫神社), a Shinto shrine located in Ōtsu, Shiga, Japan
- Tenson dynasty (天孫王朝), the legendary first royal dynasty of the Ryukyu Islands founded by Tenson

== See also ==
- Tenson kōrin (天孫降臨), descendants of Ninigi (grandson of Amaterasu)
- Tonson (surname)
