= Tanden =

Tanden may refer to:

- Dantian, the "energy center" in traditional Chinese medicine and in meditative and exercise techniques such as qigong, martial arts and tai chi
- Tandon, Indian surname
  - Neera Tanden (born 1970), American political consultant and former government official

== See also ==
- Tondon (disambiguation)
