= Tondon (disambiguation) =

Tondon is a town in western Guinea.

Tondon may also refer to:

- Tondon, a district in North Toraja Regency, Indonesia
- Tondon river, or Dondon, another name for Anyuy River (Khabarovsk Krai), Russia
- Butadon, also read as Tondon, a pork equivalent to the Japanese beef dish gyūdon
- Tandon, an Indian surname

== See also ==
- Tonson (surname)
- Tanden (disambiguation)
- Dondon (disambiguation)
