= Tonson (surname) =

Tonson or Tõnson is a surname. Notable people with this surname include the following.

- Jacob Tonson, (1655 – 1736), English bookseller and publisher
- Leopold Tõnson, (1878 – 1935), Estonian military
- Ludlow Tonson, 3rd Baron Riversdale (1784 – 1861), Irish bishop
- William Tonson, 1st Baron Riversdale (1724 – 1787), Irish politician

== See also ==
- Tenson (disambiguation)
- Tondon (disambiguation)
- Tonson Group
- Tonton (disambiguation)
- Towson (disambiguation)
- Tân Sơn (disambiguation)
