= Tân Sơn =

Tân Sơn may refer to:

- Tân Sơn District, Vietnam
- Tân Sơn, Bac Giang, Vietnam
- Tân Sơn, Bac Kan, Vietnam
- Tân Sơn, Ninh Thuận, Vietnam

== See also ==
- Tonson (surname)
