= Dumb Dumb =

Dumb Dumb may refer to:

- "Dumb Dumb" (Red Velvet song), a 2015 by Red Velvet from the album The Red
- "Dumb Dumb" (Jeon Somi song), a 2021 single by Somi
- "Dumb Dumb", a 2021 single by Mazie from the album the rainbow cassette

== See also ==
- Dum Dum (disambiguation)
- Dumdi Dumdi, an album by (G)I-dle
