= Towson (disambiguation) =

Towson may refer to:

== Places ==
In the United States:

- Towson, Maryland, an unincorporated community in Maryland
  - Towson Center, one of Towson University's sports arenas
  - Towson Square, an outdoor mall
  - Towson Town Center, a shopping mall
- Fort Towson, Oklahoma, a community in Oklahoma
- Fort Towson, a historical military fort in the old Indian Territory in Oklahoma
- Towson County, Choctaw Nation, in the Indian Territory

== People with the surname ==
- Nathaniel Towson (1784–1854), United States Army officer
- Toby Towson, American gymnast and dancer

== Schools ==
- Towson High School, in Baltimore County, Maryland
- Towson University, a public university in Baltimore County, Maryland
- Towson Catholic High School, a former school in Baltimore County, Maryland

== See also ==
- Tonson (surname)
