= Emîr Xan Lepzêrîn =

Kurdish ruler of Baradust

- ئەمیر خانی لەپزێرین
- Born: Early 17th century Safavid Kurdistan
- Died: 1610; Dimdim Castle, Kurdistan
- Other names: Amir Khan Lepzêrîn, Khani Lepzêrîn
- Military career
- Allegiance: Kurdish tribes
- Rank: Commander
- Known for: Defense of Dimdim Castle, Kurdish resistance against the Safavid Empire
- Battles and Wars: Siege of Dimdim (1609–1610); Kurdish Rebellion (1609–1610)
- Memorials: Commemorated annually by Kurdish communities, celebrated in Kurdish folklore, Kurdish literature, and Kurdish national identity
- Other work: Revered in Kurdish cultural movements, featured in novels, plays, and intellectual articles

Emîr Xan Lepzêrîn (also known as Amir Khan Lepzêrîn or Khani Lepzêrîn; Kurdish: ئەمیر خانی لەپزێڕین or خانی لەپزێڕین; lit. 'The emir of the Golden palm') was a Kurdish leader and commander, best known for his defense of the Dimdim Castle against the Safavid Empire in the early 17th century. His legacy is celebrated in Kurdish history and literature for his resistance against imperial forces and his commitment to Kurdish autonomy.

== Early life ==
Emîr Xan Lepzêrîn was born in the early 17th century in what is today the Kurdish region of western Iran. As a member of the prominent Kurdish ruling family, he rose to prominence in the region during a time of political upheaval between the Ottoman Empire and the Safavid Empire, both vying for control over Kurdish territories.

== Siege of Dimdim ==
The most significant event in Lepzêrîn's life was his role in the defense of Dimdim Castle. In 1609, the castle, located in the mountainous region near Lake Urmia, became the focal point of a Kurdish rebellion against the Safavid forces led by Shah Abbas I.

Lepzêrîn, alongside other Kurdish leaders, organized the defense of the castle with the aim of maintaining Kurdish autonomy in the face of growing Safavid influence. The siege, which lasted nearly a year, involved intense battles and heavy casualties on both sides.

According to Kurdish oral tradition and historical records, the defense of Dimdim became a symbol of Kurdish resistance. Although the castle eventually fell to the Safavid forces in 1610, Emîr Xan Lepzêrîn's bravery and dedication were immortalized in Kurdish folklore.

== Legacy ==
Lepzêrîn's resistance at Dimdim Castle is regarded as one of the most significant moments in Kurdish history. His story has been preserved for centuries in Kurdish literary works, poems, and songs. The Dimdim rebellion in particular has served as a major source of inspiration for Kurdish national identity and pride.

Numerous Kurdish authors, poets, and historians have emphasized his importance in their writings. His legacy continues to inspire Kurdish cultural movements, and the story of Dimdim has become a powerful symbol of resistance against oppression. The memory of Lepzêrîn remains ingrained in the Kurdish cultural consciousness, and he is revered as a symbol of defiance against tyranny. His legacy is also commemorated annually by Kurdish communities through various events and memorials.

In modern literature, Emîr Xan Lepzêrîn's story continues to be explored in novels, plays, and articles by Kurdish intellectuals, further solidifying his place in Kurdish history.
