= Tonton Macoute (disambiguation) =

Tonton Macoute was a special operations unit of the Haitian paramilitary force created in 1959.

Tonton Macoute may also refer to:

- Ton-Ton Macoute!, a 1970 album by American artist Johnny Jenkins
- Ton-Ton Macoute, a Haitian mythological phrase meaning "bogey man" (literally: "Uncle Bagman")
- "Tonton Macoutes", a track on Coup d'etat (Muslimgauze album) (1987)
- British progressive jazz-rock band Tonton Macoute, and their 1971 album Tonton Macoute
- Ton Ton Macoute, a 1980s Irish band featuring Sinéad O'Connor and Colm Farrelly

== See also ==
- Tonton (disambiguation)
