= Dom Dom =

Fast food restaurant chain in Japan

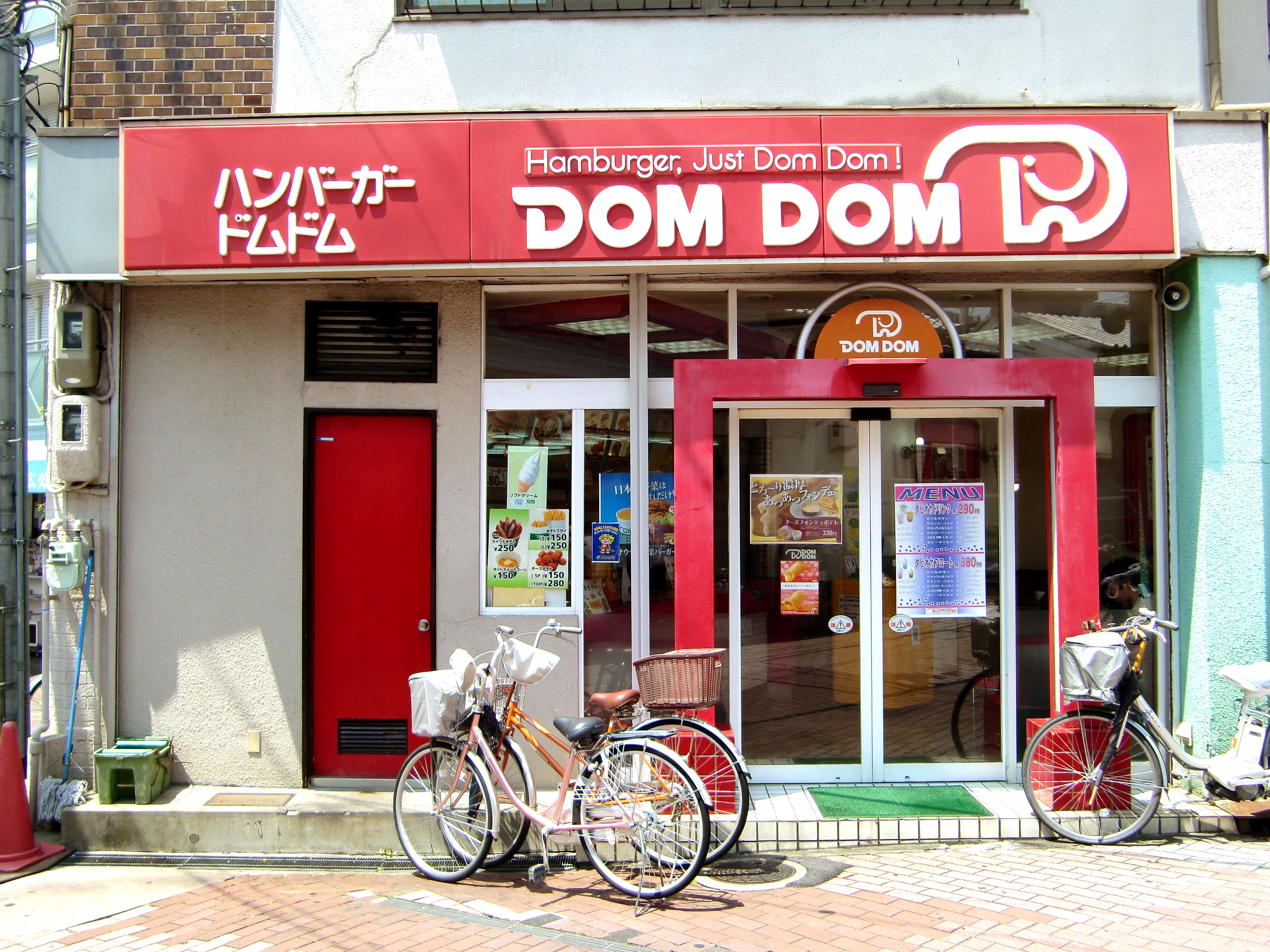
Dom Dom in Ibaraki, Ibaraki Prefecture

Dom Dom is a Japanese fast food restaurant chain operated by Dom Dom Food Service, Inc. It used to be operated by Orange Food Court, Inc before July 2017. Dom Dom was the first hamburger chain to open in Japan, with the first restaurant opening in February 1970.

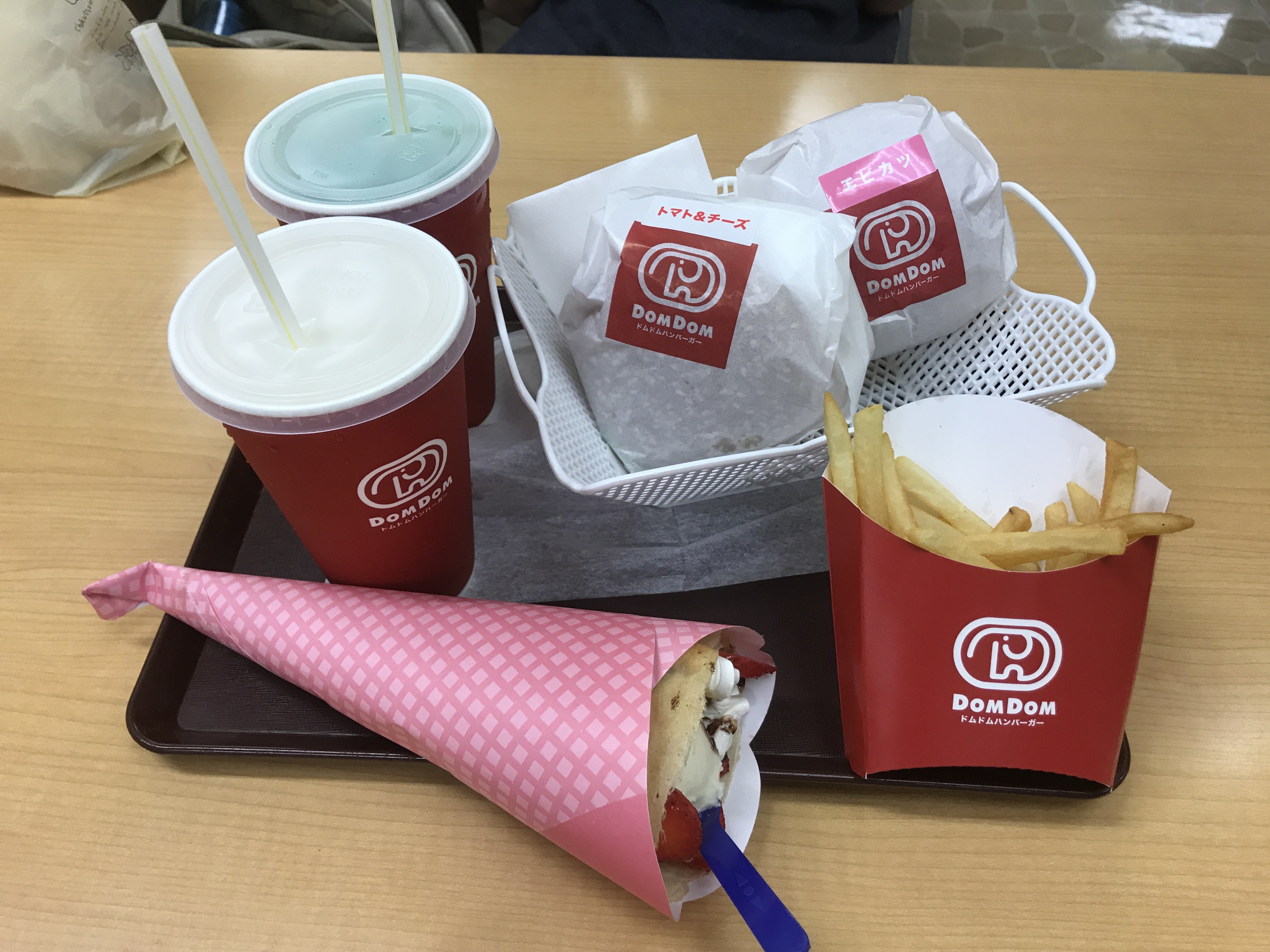
Package

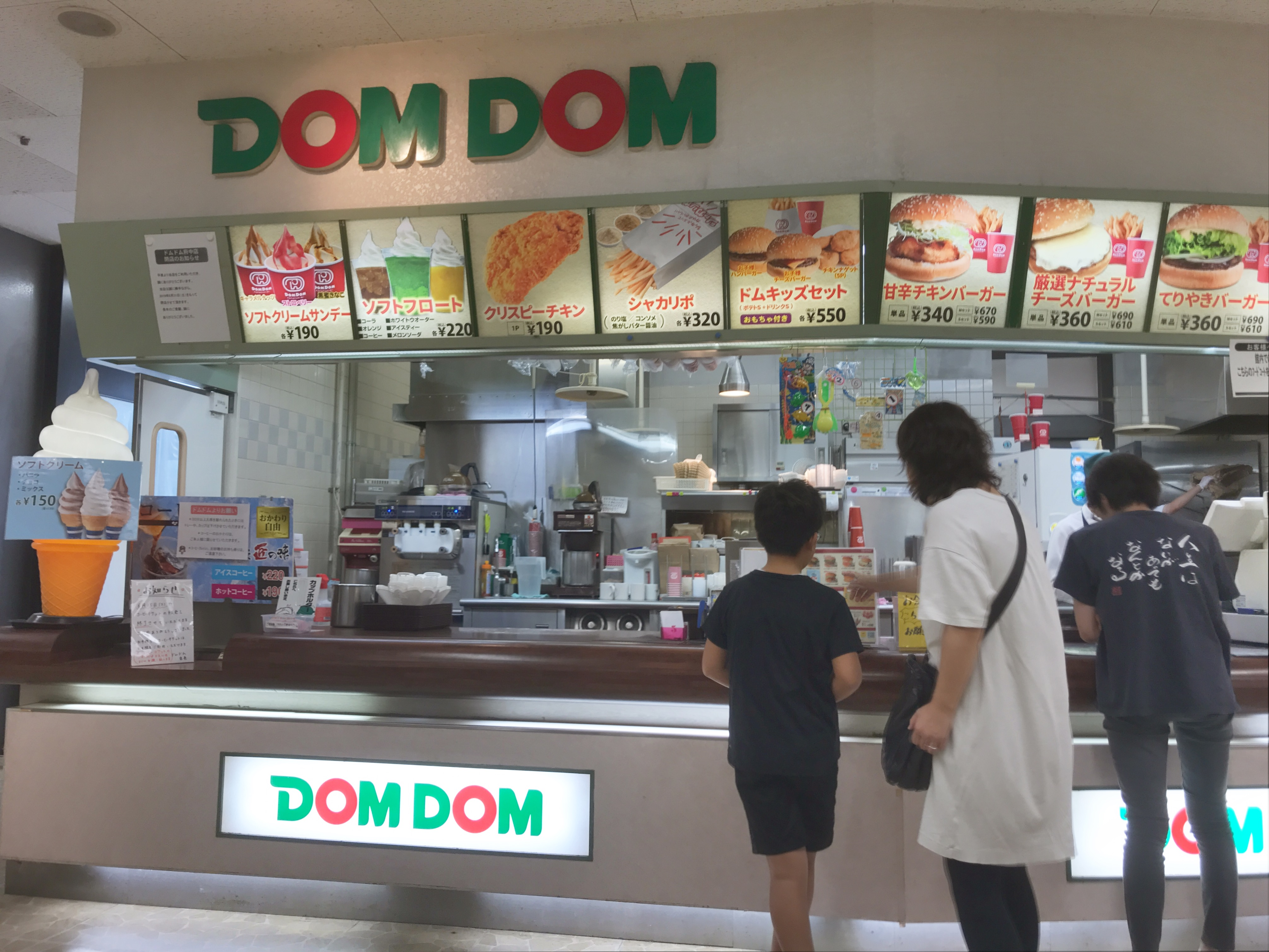
Counter
