= Syrianska KF =

Swedish football club

- Full name: Syrianska Kultur Föreningen i Norrköping
- Founded: 1977
- Ground: Navestad IP; Norrköping; Sweden
- Chairman: Daniel Yalin
- Head coach: Roman Arapovic
- Coach: Mikael Larsson
- League: Division 4 Östergötland Östra
Home colours

Syrianska KF is a Swedish football club located in Norrköping.

== Background ==
Syrianska KF currently plays in Division 4 Östergötland Östra which is the sixth tier of Swedish football. They play their home matches at the Navestad IP in Norrköping.

The club is affiliated to Östergötlands Fotbollförbund.

== Season to season ==
Season	Level	Division	Section	Position	Movements
2006*	Tier 8	Division 6	Östergötland Östra	1st	Promoted
2007	Tier 7	Division 5	Östergötland Östra	1st	Promoted
2008	Tier 6	Division 4	Östergötland Östra	1st	Promoted
2009	Tier 5	Division 3	Nordöstra Götaland	12th	Relegated
2010	Tier 6	Division 4	Östergötland Östra	7th	
2011	Tier 6	Division 4	Östergötland Östra		

* League restructuring in 2006 resulted in a new division being created at Tier 3 and subsequent divisions dropping a level.
