= Stéphane Dondon =

French basketball player

Stéphane Dondon (born 9 January 1977 in Melun, France) is a French basketball player who played for French Pro A league clubs Vichy, Chalon/Saône and Cholet between 2002 and 2008. He played college basketball in the United States for Collin County Community College and the University of Virginia.
