= Ton-Taun =

American indie rock band from Pennsylvania

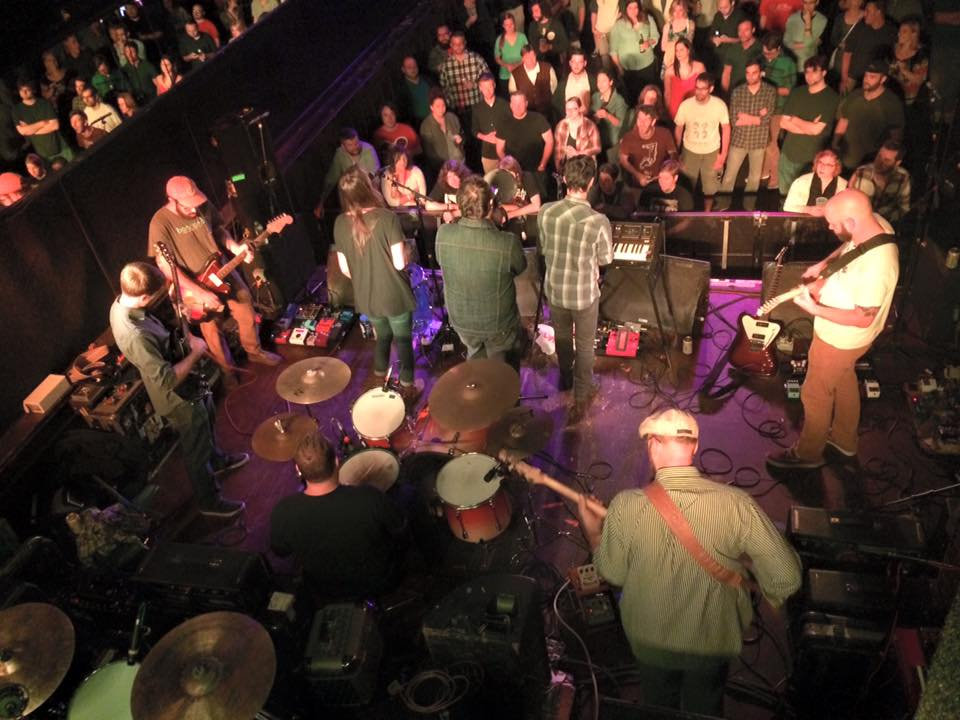
Ton-Taun in 2015

Ton-Taun was an American indie rock band from Lancaster, Pennsylvania. Since 2007, they have released five albums.

== History ==
The band, whose founding members Jordan Capizzi and Doug Hynes met while attending high school in Lancaster, Pennsylvania was formed in 2007. Their debut album Circus Court was released in 2009. Their sophomore album Exporter was released in 2010. Their third album, titled Get Well was released in 2012 and was met with critical praise. This was followed by several lineup changes. In August 2015 Ton-Taun released their fourth album, a double LP titled "You're Not Doing It Right". A series of music videos preceded the release of the album. "You're Not Doing It Right" was made available on August 22, 2015 on iTunes, CD and limited edition colored vinyl and was lauded for its ambition. They have shared the stage with Future Islands, Why?, Clap Your Hands Say Yeah, Ra Ra Riot, Rubblebucket, Lavender Diamond, Kopecky and Built To Spill.

== Current members ==
- Jordan Capizzi-Vocals, Keys, Guitar
- Doug Hynes-Guitar
- Aaron Binder-Guitar, Keys
- Brian Trump-Drums
- Rob Nye-Bass
- John Spurlock-Keys, Guitar
- Kate Seifarth-Percussion, Vocals

== Former members ==
- Mario Borgatta
- Louis Borgatta
- Josh Wood
- Alex Ocko

== Discography ==
- Circus Court (2009)
- Exporter (2010)
- Get Well (2012)
- You're Not Doing It Right (2015)
- Ton-Taun Vs. The Volcano (2018)
