= Dondon (footballer) =

Brazilian footballer

Personal information
- Full name: Antônio de Paula Filho
- Date of birth: 4 July 1912
- Place of birth: Magé, Brazil
- Date of death: 30 March 1993 (aged 59)
- Place of death: Rio de Janeiro, Brazil
- Position: Defender

Senior career*
Years	Team	Apps	(Gls)
1930–1937	Andarahy		
1938–1940	Confiança-RJ		
- * Club domestic league appearances and goals as of 4 February 2024

Antônio de Paula Filho (4 July 1912 – 30 March 1993), better known as Dondon, was a Brazilian professional footballer who played as a defender.

== Career ==
A defender with great technical ability, Dondon is considered the greatest player of the now extinct Andarahy AC, from the North Zone of Rio de Janeiro. He defended the club from the beginning of the 1930s until 1937, with the best result being runner-up in 1934, entering Brazilian popular culture thanks to the samba by composer Nei Lopes, entitled "Tempos de Dondon" (English: "Ages of Dondon"). In 2016, a proposed law in Rio de Janeiro created the space "Largo do Dondon", in the Andaraí neighborhood.
