= Dom (surname) =

Dom is a surname. Notable people with the surname include:

- Annelies Dom (born 1986), Belgian racing cyclist
- Jeanny Dom, Luxembourgish retired table tennis player
- Joren Dom (born 1989), Belgian footballer
- Martinus Dom (1791–1873), first abbot of the Trappist Abbey of Westmalle in Belgium and founder of the Trappist brewery
