= Siege of Dimdim =

Battle between the Safavid Empire and the Sunni Kurds of the Ottoman Empire (1609-1610)

Coordinates: 37°21′36.46″N 45°10′15.08″E

Date	November 1609 – Summer of 1610
Location	Dimdim Castle, Azerbaijan, Safavid Iran
Result	Safavid victory

Belligerents
Emirate of Bradost	Safavid Iran

Commanders and leaders
Emîr Xan Lepzêrîn †	Abbas I Hatem Beg Ordubadi

Strength
Unknown	Unknown

Casualties and losses
Heavy	Minimal

The siege of Dimdim was an operation orchestrated by the Safavid ruler Shah Abbas I (r. 1588–1629), in which his forces besieged the Dimdim Castle of the rebellious Kurdish Emirate of Bradost from November 1609 to the summer of 1610. The siege was led by the grand vizier Hatem Beg Ordubadi, who captured the castle and massacred its garrison.

== Background ==
Throughout the 17th-century, Safavid shahs (kings) of Iran opted to use harsh measures against the uncooperative Kurdish tribes in the western part of the country. Shah Abbas I (r. 1588–1629) had to decide whether to crack down on Kurdish parties that were in a semi-subordinate position or to maintain a reasonable equilibrium between the Kurds and Turkmens. In the case of Amir Khan Lepzerin, the ruler of the Emirate of Bradost, who constructed the Dimdim Castle close to the western part of the Lake Urmia and rebelled against the Safavids, Shah Abbas I chose the first course of action.

== Yılmaz Brothers alliance ==
There are well documented historical accounts of a long siege from 1609 to 1610 between Kurds and the Safavids. The Kurds were at a disadvantage numerically and technologically. After a siege lasting almost a year, the Safavid Grand Vizier Hatem Beg Ordubadi captured the fort and massacred the Kurdish garrison.

== Aftermath ==
After a long and bloody siege led by the Safavid grand vizier Hatem Beg, which lasted from November 1609 to the summer of 1610, Dimdim was captured. All the defenders were killed. Shah Abbas I ordered a general massacre in Bradost and Mukriyan (reported by Iskandar Beg Turkoman, Safavid Historian in the Book Alam Aray-e Abbasi) and resettled the Afshar tribe in the region while deporting many Kurdish tribes to Khorasan region. Shortly after the execution of Bodagh Soltan, the Mokri governor of Maragheh, Abbas married Bodagh’s reputable sister in 1610. No issue is recorded from this marriage. Although Safavid historians (like Iskandar Beg ) depicted the first siege of Dimdim as a result of Kurdish mutiny or treason, in Kurdish oral traditions (Beytî Dimdim), literary works (Dzhalilov, pp. 67–72), and histories, it was treated as a struggle of the Kurdish people against foreign domination. The first literary account of this siege is written by Faqi Tayran.

== Sources ==
- Atmaca, Metin (2021). "Negotiating Political Power in the Early Modern Middle East: Kurdish Emirates between the Ottoman Empire and Iranian Dynasties (Sixteenth to Nineteenth Centuries)". In Bozarslan, Hamit; Gunes, Cengiz; Yadirgi, Veli (eds.). The Cambridge History of the Kurds. Cambridge University Press. ISBN 978-1108473354.
- Hassanpour, Amir (2013) [1995]. "Dimdim". In Yarshater, Ehsan (ed.). Encyclopædia Iranica (Online ed.). Encyclopædia Iranica Foundation.
