= Dumdum, Kaimur =

Dumdum
- Village
- Location in Bihar, India Dumdum (India)
- Coordinates: 25.02452°N 83.58819°E
- Country: India
- State: Bihar
- District: Kaimur

Area
  - Total: 2.71 km^{2} (1.05 sq mi)
- Elevation: 92 m (302 ft)

Population (2011)
  - Total: 2,281
  - Density: 842/km^{2} (2,180/sq mi)

Languages
  - Official: Bhojpuri, Hindi
- Time zone: UTC+5:30 (IST)

Dumdum is a village in Bhabua block of Kaimur district, Bihar, India. As of 2011, its population was 2,281, in 368 households.
