= Dimdim Castle =

Kurdish castle in Iran

- Kurdish: قەڵای دمدم (Qelay Dimdim)
- Mount Dimdim, West Azerbaijan Province, Iran in Iran

Site information
- Type: Fortress
- Open to the public: Yes

Location
- Dimdim Castle location in Iran
- Dimdim Castle location in Iran
- Coordinates: 37°23′26.1″N 45°10′57.77″E

Site history
- Built: 1609
- Built by: Emîr Xan Lepzêrîn
- In use: 1609–1610 (sieged by the Safavid Empire)
- Fate: Rebuilt after siege
- Battles/wars: Battle of Dimdim
- Events: Siege by Safavid Empire forces in 1609

Dimdim Castle (Kurdish: قەڵای دمدم, romanized: Qelay Dimdim, Persian: قلعه دمدم) was a Kurdish fortress located on top of Mount Dimdim in West Azerbaijan Province of Iran, just west of Lake Urmia. This fortress was the location of the Battle of Dimdim.

According to Kurdish oral tradition the fortress was built in the pre-Islamic era. The castle suffered an attack by the Safavid Empire and was sacked in 1609, then rebuilt by the Amir Khan Lepzerin in the same year. Other source mentioned that the siege of Dimdim Castle was in 1610.

== Name ==
The word "Dimdim" may be onomatopoeic for the noise which the stones of the castle made when they dropped from the castle into the valley.

== See also ==
- Battle of Dimdim
- Ottoman–Safavid War (1603–18)
- List of Kurdish castles
- List of castles in Iran

== Sources ==
- Hassanpour, Amir (1995). "Dimdim". In Yarshater, Ehsan (ed.). Encyclopædia Iranica. Vol. VII/4: Deylam, John of–Divorce IV. In modern Persia. London and New York: Routledge & Kegan Paul. pp. 404–405. ISBN 978-1-56859-022-6.
