= Tonton Zola Moukoko =

Congolese-born Swedish footballer (born 1983)

Tonton Moukoko
Personal information
- Full name: Tonton Zola Moukoko
- Date of birth: 22 December 1983 (age 42)
- Place of birth: Kinshasa, Zaire
- Height: 5 ft 7 in (1.70 m)
- Position: Central midfielder

Youth career
- –1999: Djurgården
- 1999–2000: Derby County

Senior career*
Years	Team	Apps	(Gls)
2000–2002	Derby County	0	(0)
2004–2006	Carlstad United	43	(6)
2007–2008	Sleipner	8	(0)
2009	Syrianska KF	11	(1)
2009	Atlantis	22	(0)
2011–2014	Lidingö	13	(0)
2015–2016	Kongo United FC	20	(3)
Total		117	(10)
- * Club domestic league appearances and goals as of 23:03, 6 August 2010 (UTC)

Tonton Zola Moukoko (born 22 December 1983) is a Swedish former footballer who played as a midfielder. He is renowned for being a legendary figure in the Championship Manager video game series.

== Career ==
=== Early career ===
Moukoko arrived in Sweden aged seven or nine with his brother Fedo, after they were orphaned. He began playing with Djurgården's youth teams and came to be considered one of the most talented young players in Sweden. Moukoko was granted Swedish citizenship in autumn 1998 and was immediately called into the Sweden U16 squad for training camps.

At the time, many of Europe's leading clubs were interested in signing Moukoko, and in April 1999, he trained with Bologna and Empoli.

=== Derby County ===
Moukoko joined Derby County as a 15-year-old and featured in the 1999–00 FA Youth Cup. When he signed a professional contract upon turning 17 in December 2000, it was reported that he turned down a competing offer from AC Milan. With Moukoko playing in the youths and reserves at Derby it was thought likely by fans and Moukoko himself that he would break into the first team. However, early in the 2002–03 season he returned to Sweden after suffering family problems and falling out with club management over his study arrangements.

Moukoko trained with Hammarby and then spent summer 2003 on trial with Falkirk. After he scored in a 3–0 pre-season friendly win over Queen's Park on 7 July 2003, the Scottish club's manager John Hughes was reported to have said: "I thought Ton Ton [sic] was brilliant, absolutely brilliant, if you had caught him in training the other day, you couldn't kick his backside, and he's a flying machine. Ton Ton [sic] lightens the place up, he is a great wee smiler and takes pelters from the boys for his hairstyles, but he is a really good kid."

=== Return to Sweden ===
England manager Sven-Göran Eriksson and his assistant Tord Grip helped Moukoko to get a contract with Carlstad United in the Swedish football Division 2. After a period of inactivity, he then signed a two-year contract with Sleipner ahead of the 2007 season. After the two years, Moukoko began the 2009 season with Syrianska KF in Norrköping.

=== Atlantis ===
Moukoko moved to the Finnish club Atlantis during the 2009 season. He played in ten games and failed to score, as the club were relegated from the Ykkönen.

=== Lidingö ===
In 2013, Moukoko began playing for Lidingö and coaching one of the club's youth teams.

Moukoko retired aged 28, affected by the death of his brother, who had been his manager/agent.

== Personal life ==
Moukoko was born in Zaire (now DR Congo).

When interviewed for the BBC Radio series Sporting Witness in 2022, Moukoko revealed that he was working as a sports agent in Sweden. Among his notable clients is his cousin's son R. Sasikumar of Kampung Rawa (currently in the 7th Division of Malaysian League).

== Championship Manager ==
Moukoko achieved fame through his depiction as one of the best players in Championship Manager, a video game developed by Sports Interactive. He was frequently telephoned by fans of the game, who have also set up dedicated Facebook groups.
