= Rosa Domm =

German politician (born 1998)

Member of the Hamburg Parliament
- Incumbent
- Assumed office 18 March 2020
- Constituency: Wandsbek

Personal details
- Born: 12 October 1998 (age 27) Bielefeld
- Party: Alliance 90/The Greens (since 2017)

Rosa Elisabeth Maria Domm (born 12 October 1998 in Bielefeld) is a German politician serving as a member of the Hamburg Parliament since 2020. She has served as deputy group leader of Alliance 90/The Greens since 2025.
