= Days on market =

Days on market (DOM, alternatively active days on market, market time, or time on market) is a measurement of the age of a real estate listing. The statistic is defined as the total number of days the listing is on the active market before either an offer is accepted or the agreement between real estate broker and seller ends.

Generally, properties with a large DOM value will command lower prices than properties with few DOM because a perception exists that the property may be overpriced or less desirable. DOM often factors into developing a pricing strategy. DOM can also be used as a "thermometer" to gauge the temperature of a housing market.

The other use for this statistic is allowing prospective home sellers an idea of how long it may take to sell a property. The MLS is controlled by the real estate industry and has been the subject of many lawsuits.

This value is not necessarily how long the house has been on the market due to intricacies within the multiple listing service (MLS) database. Depending on the rules of the MLS that is being used, the number is reset if a seller switches real estate agents. Sometimes there is also the arguably unethical practice of "withdrawing" the listing before it expires and adding the listing again to reset the DOM. As a result, when this statistic is used it is often lower than the true value. However, savvy real estate agents (if the MLS allows) will research the property's listing history and can tell more effectively how long the property has been on the market.

== DOMM ==
Days on the Market- MLS (DOM-M or DOMM) is the number of days this exact Multiple Listing Service (MLS) listing has been on the market.

== DOMP ==
Days on the Market- Property (DOM-P or DOMP) is the number of days the property has been for sale regardless of the number of different Realtors.

== Housing bubble ==
Prior to the historic housing bubble that formed in or around 2001 due to loose credit and irrational exuberance, the term DOMP was practically a mystery to anyone other than real estate industry insiders.

When the Housing Bubble began to rapidly deflate in late 2005, the inventory of homes for sale exploded, which caused both sales and prices to fall well below the levels predicted by leading economists. These economists were frequently separated into varying levels of respect depending on their affiliation with the REIC, because the National Association of Realtors (NAR) economists were caught giving incorrect predictions about the state of the housing market despite what was happening in many U.S cities.

== Manipulating DOMP ==
To prop up rapidly falling sales, real estate agents across the country began to rely on the process of manipulating the amount of time that homes had been on the market more than ever to attract buyers and maintain sales prices. There were great disparities concerning the practice in the various regional MLS's across the country. Some MLS's charged real estate agents to alter the statistics, and referred to the practice as "refreshing a listing." In general, however, the old guard of the real estate industry considered the practice as deceptive at best, and fraudulent at worst. Rumors of possible lawsuits circulated in the industry because homes that had been on the market for long periods of time were considered to be overpriced and thus not worth their advertised sales prices. The practice also stood in dark contrast to the National Association of Realtor's Code of Ethics that prohibits doing anything that is deceptive to buyers.

Sometimes a property might be 83 days with one Realtor, and then 10 days with another. That would show up as: DOMP/DOMM= 93/10. Some realtors will try to fudge this data to make a listing look brand new.

== Current use ==
This business practice is still being carried out by the REIC and is a point of contention with bloggers calling it "deceptive". Others maintain it is a way to acquire the attention of new customers, akin to a store moving its inventory from one location to another. MLS information like days on the market, the selling price and who were the buying agents or buyers is not available in Canada to any-one but REALTORS^{r}.
