= Domingo G. Landicho =

Filipino writer and academician (1939-2021)

Domingo Goan Landicho (also called "Domeng"; 4 August 1939 – 29 July 2021), was a Filipino writer and academician.

== Biography ==
Landicho was born on August 4, 1939 in Luntal, Taal, Batangas. His brother is Tonton Landicho. He obtained his Bachelor of Arts and Bachelor of Science in journalism degrees from the Lyceum of the Philippines, and an MA in education at the National Teachers College. He later earned his Bachelor of Laws degree at Lyceum. In 1994, he obtained his Ph.D. in Filipinology from the University of the Philippines Diliman, where he has served as Writer-in-Residence and professor at the Department of Filipino and Philippine Literature and associate director for criticism at the Institute of Creative Writing. He was accorded Professor Emeritus stature by the University of the Philippines in 2005.

He was Director for Asia of Poet Laureate International, member of PEN International, and honorary member of International Writers' Workshop, University of Iowa.

He received numerous awards such as several Palancas, CCP Balagtas Awards, KADIPAN Literary Contest, Catholic Mass Media Awards, and Institute of National Language Awards. He is a poet, a novelist, an editor, columnist, a dramatist, a theatre and movie actor who has written close to 60 book titles to date with "Supremo", a dramatic play he co-wrote with his wife Edna May, about revolutionary leader and Philippine hero Andres Bonifacio.

He served as the Editor-In-Chief of Tanod Publication and contributed to various Philippine publications such as Philippine Star, Liwayway Publications, and Pilipino Ngayon, among others.

He was married to Edna May Menez Obien, a playwright and theatre director and has 4 children.

He died in the morning of 29 July 2021.

== Some Publications ==
- Kaya ng Pinoy
- Paglalakbay, Mga Piling Tula (1974)
- Himagsik, Mga Nagkagantimpalang Kuwento (1972)
- Sa Bagwis at Sigwa (1976)
- Niño Engkantado (1979)
- Burat ng Kamatayan (1983)
- Alay (Katipunan ng mga Piling Tula) (1984)
- Tula sa Ating Panahon (1989)
- Dupluhang Bayan at Dalawa pang Tula (1990)
- Apoy at Unos (Katipunan ng mga Tulang Popular) (1993)
- Bulaklak ng Maynila. Dakilang Gantimpala, Carlos Palanca Memorial Awards for Literature. Made into a film and directed by Joel Lamangan Bulaklak Ng Maynila (1995)
- Putong (2001)
- Anak ng Lupa (1995), National Book Development Board (NBDB) Nomination
- Mata ng Apoy (2003)
- Suob - Compilation of Batangas Poetry (2006)
- Ninoy at Cory: Magkabiyak na Bayani (2009)
- Pusod (2010)
- Pag-ibig sa Mata ng Unos (2012)
- Alab ng Puso (2012)

== Literary awards and recognition ==
- Professor Emeritus, University of the Philippines Diliman 2005
- Writer-in-residence, De La Salle University 2010-2011
- President, 16th World Congress of Poets 2000 organized by the United Poets Laureate International
- One of 2000 Outstanding Writers of the 20th Century, International Biographical Centre Cambridge
- Keynote, Asian Writers Conference in Seoul, Korea 1993
- Represented the Philippines and Philippine literature in numerous world conferences: Germany (1981), Vietnam (1983), Cambodia (1983), Russia (1986), United States (1992) and United Kingdom (1997)
- S.E.A. Write Award 2003 Awardee
- Carlos Palanca Memorial Awards for Literature
  - 1967 – Short Story Second Prize: "Talulot sa Pagas na Lupa"
  - 1968- Short Story Third Prize: "Himagsik ni Emmanuel Lazaro"
  - 1969- Short Story Third Prize: "Elias at Salome"
  - 1970 – Short Story Third Prize : "Dugo sa Kanyang Pagsilang"
  - 1975 - Short Story First Prize : "Huwag Mong Tangisan Ang Kamatayan ng Isang Pilipino sa Dibdib ng Niyebe"
  - 1976 - Maikiling Kuwento Third Prize: "Ang Pangarap ni Isis"
  - 1993 – Grand Prize Novel : "Bulaklak ng Maynila"
  - 1998 - Essay in Filipino Third Prize: "Dyipni"
  - 2005 - Short Story in Filipino Second Prize: "Anay Sa Dagat Na Asul"

== Other Accomplishments ==
- Starred as Hartono in The Year of Living Dangerously (1982) alongside Mel Gibson and Sigourney Weaver, directed by Peter Weir
- Examiner Responsible for Filipino, International Baccalaureate Organization in England
- Faithful Navigator, Faithful Captain, Grand Knight, Knights of Columbus
- Special Minister of the Holy Communion in a parish in Novaliches, Quezon City, Philippines
- Lifetime Member, National Press Club of the Philippines
- Former Execom Member of the National Commission for Culture and the Arts

Recognition by the University of the Philippines. Article here in Philippines Star
