= Tonton Landicho =

Filipino actor

- Born: Tonton Landicho; May 10, 1978 (age 48); Philippines
- Occupations: Host, actor
- Years active: 1989–present

Tonton Landicho is a Filipino actor. He is the brother of fellow actor Domingo Landicho and the son of Cogie Landicho.

== Filmography ==
=== Television ===
Year	Title	Role
2007	Sine Novela: Pati Ba Pintig ng Puso	Alfred Ramirez
2008	Lobo	Marco Severino
2010	Maalaala Mo Kaya: Pinwheel	Jomar
2010	Rosalka	Crisanto Salcedo
2011	Ikaw Lang ang Mamahalin	Brando Gonzales
2012	Maalaala Mo Kaya: Baunan	Benjie
2012	Broken Vow	Ronnie Sebastian
2012	Temptation of Wife	Carlo Dimaano
2012	A Beautiful Affair	Romualdo "Waldo" Saavedra
2013	Akin Pa Rin ang Bukas	Lorenzo Villacorta
2014	The Borrowed Wife	Edgar Aquino
2014	Panalangin	Daniel

=== Film ===
- Betrayal: Gunfire (1989) - Crystal
- Imortal (1989) - Franco
- Angelito San Miguel: Ang Batang City Jail (1991) - Javier
- Noel Juico: Batang Kriminal (1991) - Anthony
- Isyanya (1995) - Danilo
- Shadow Hunters: Kriminal II (1999) - Merando
- Erenea (2000) - Ybrahius
- Skies of Beauty (2004) - Danny Saylor
- Lauriana (2013) - Isaac Blanco
- Christine Santiago of Mansion (2014) - Dante Alvarez
