= Iran crisis of 1946 =

Soviet Union's refusal to withdraw from Iran

- Part of the aftermath of the Second World War, prelude to the Cold War, Azerbaijani and Kurdish separatism in Iran
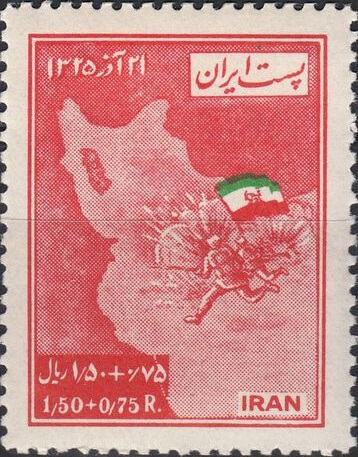
- Iranian postage stamp commemorating the fourth anniversary of the liberation of Azerbaijan
Date	November 1945 – December 15, 1946
Location	Iran
Result	Iranian government victory: Dissolution of the Azerbaijan People's Government and the Republic of Mahabad

Belligerents
Iran; Supported by: United Kingdom; United States	Azerbaijan People's Government; Republic of Mahabad; Tudeh Military Network; Supported by: Soviet Union

Commanders and leaders
Mohammad Reza Shah Pahlavi; Ebrahim Hakimi; Ahmad Qavam; Ali Razmara	Ja'far Pishevari; Ahmad Kordary (POW); Qazi Muhammad (executed); Mustafa Barzani Salahaddin Kazimov; Mir Jafar Baghirov

Units involved
Imperial Iranian Army	Azerbaijani militias Kurdish tribes

Strength
Unknown	12,750 Peshmerga infantry and cavalry

Casualties and losses
Hundreds killed (per Kurdish reports)	Unknown
- 2,000 killed in total

The Iran crisis of 1946, also known as the Azerbaijan crisis (Persian: غائلهٔ آذربایجان, romanized: Qā'ele-ye Āzarbāyejān) in Iranian sources, was one of the first crises during the aftermath of World War II, sparked by the refusal of Joseph Stalin's Soviet Union to relinquish occupied Iranian territory despite repeated assurances. The end of World War II should have resulted in the end of the Allied joint occupation of Iran. Instead, pro-Soviet Iranians proclaimed the separatist Azerbaijan People's Government and the Kurdish separatist Republic of Mahabad. The United States pressure on the Soviet Union to withdraw is the earliest evidence of success with what would become the new strategy of the Truman Doctrine and containment.

In August–September 1941, Pahlavi Iran had been jointly invaded and occupied by the Allied powers: the Soviet Red Army invaded in the north; the British invaded from the south into the centre. Iran was used by the Americans and the British as a transportation route to provide vital supplies to the Soviet Union's war efforts.

In the aftermath of the occupation of Iran, those Allied forces agreed to withdraw from Iran within six months after the cessation of hostilities. However, when this deadline came in early 1946, the Soviets, under Joseph Stalin, remained in Iran. Soon, the alliance of the Kurdish and People's Azerbaijani forces, supported in arms and training by the Soviet Union, engaged in fighting with Iranian forces, resulting in a total of 2,000 casualties. Negotiation by Iranian premier Ahmad Qavam and diplomatic pressure on the Soviets by the United States eventually led to Soviet withdrawal and dissolution of the separatist Azerbaijani and Kurdish states.

== Background ==
After Germany broke its pact with the Soviets and invaded the USSR in June 1941, the United Kingdom and the Soviet Union jointly occupied neutral Iran as a preventive measure, starting on August 25, 1941. They justified their invasion by the need to use Iran as a gateway for delivery of Lend-Lease supplies to the Soviet Union from British India between 1941 and 1945. Iran had long been torn between the bordering zones of influence of Britain and Russia, but had managed until then to remain independent, despite several foreign interventions, by taking advantage of the rivalry between the two powers. Now that Russia and Britain stood together against Germany, nothing opposed a formal joint occupation of the country. As a result, Rezā Shāh was forced to abdicate on September 16, 1941, and exiled to Mauritius; his son, Mohammad Reza Pahlavi, the crown prince, became the new monarch. Their joint 'Tripartite Treaty' of January 1942 declared that their military presence was not an occupation, proclaimed Iran to be their ally, and pledged to withdraw their troops within six months of the end of the war.

Throughout the rest of the war, the United Kingdom and the United States used Iran as an important supply line to the Soviet war effort against Nazi Germany. Thirty thousand non-combatant U.S. troops arrived to move these supplies, and transit through Iran was later termed a "bridge to victory". At the Tehran Conference in 1943, the Big Three gave additional assurances concerning Iran's future sovereignty and territorial integrity, and also a promise to assist in its post-war reconstruction and development.

Although the occupation of Iran was scheduled to end after the war at the Potsdam Conference following Germany's surrender, Stalin objected to Churchill's proposal for an early allied withdrawal from Iran ahead of the agreed-upon schedule set at the Tehran Conference. Following VJ Day in September 1945, first the United States and then the United Kingdom withdrew their forces within the treaty-stipulated period. The Soviets not only violated the 2 March 1946 withdrawal deadline; in that time they had expanded their military presence southward. By mid-December 1945, with the use of troops and secret police, they had set up two pro-Soviet "People's Democratic Republics" within Iranian territory, the Azerbaijan People's Government headed by Sayyid Jafar Pishevari and the Kurdish Republic of Mahabad under President Pesheva Qazi Muhammad.

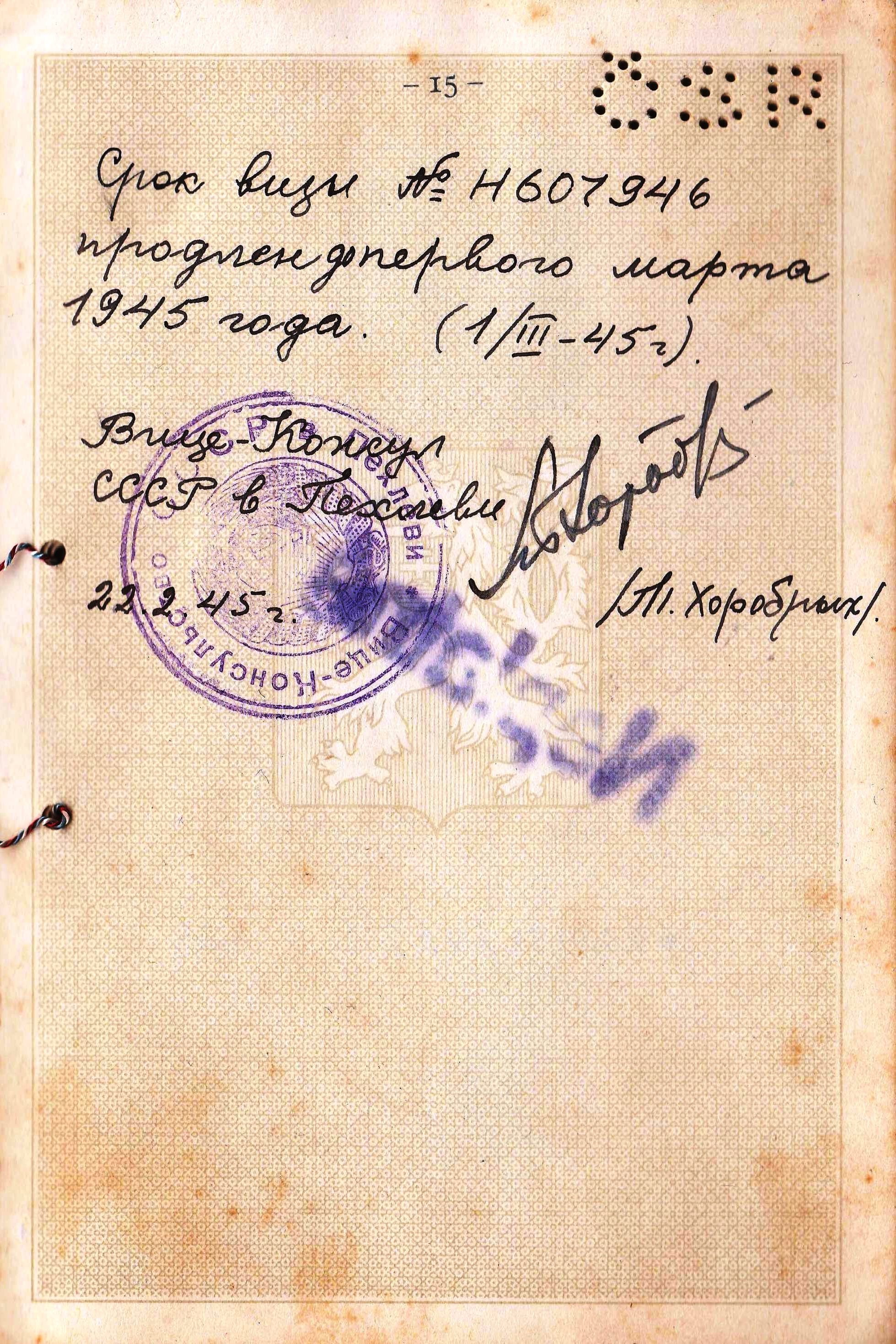
1945 Soviet consulate stamp inside a passport from 1945 during the occupation.

== Azerbaijan People's Government ==
The Azerbaijani Democratic Party (ADP) was formed in September 1945 and headed by Jafar Pishevari, a long-time leader of the revolutionary movement in Gilan. The ADP expanded throughout Iranian Azerbaijan, and initiated a local coup d'état with help from the Soviet army, who prevented the Iranian army from intervening. During the first week of September 1945, the Azerbaijani Democratic Party declared itself to be in control of Iranian Azerbaijan, promised liberal democratic reforms, and disbanded the local branch of Tudeh, the Iranian communist party.

Later in September 1945, at its first congress, the Azerbaijani Democratic Party authorized the formation of a peasant's militia, which by mid-November 1945 captured all remaining government posts in the province, and Iranian Azerbaijan "became an autonomous republic under the direction of a 39-member national and no executive committee".

Though the Soviets initially supported the new autonomous entity and prevented the Iranian army from restoring governmental control over the area, it did not last for long. After the Soviet withdrawal, Iranian troops entered the region in December 1946 and Pishevari and his cabinet fled to the Soviet Union.

== Kurdish Republic of Mahabad ==
The Mahabad Republic was proclaimed in December 1945. Leading the nascent Kurdish republic and fully endorsed by the Soviets, was Qazi Muhammad, the religious and titular leader of Mahabad. Despite Soviet opposition, Mullah Mustafa Barzani came to play an important role in the newly created military force of the Mahabad Republic – the Peshmerga. With Barzani's support secured, along with some 60 tribal Kurdish leaders, the Democratic Party of Iranian Kurdistan party platform had been established and Qazi Muhammad was elected the first president on January 22, 1946.

The Kurdish forces were advised and organized by Soviet military officer Captain Salahuddin Kazimov. The Soviets extended their influence by sending at least 60 Kurds to Soviet Azerbaijan for additional military training. In total, the Mahabad army consisted of 70 active duty officers, 40 non-commissioned officers, and 1,200 lower-enlisted privates.

On April 29, 1946, only five days after the Mahabad Republic signed a military cooperation accord with neighboring Azerbaijan, the First Kurdish Regiment, located in the southeast corner of the republic in Qahrawa, faced 600 Iranian soldiers reinforced with artillery and cavalry. In this engagement, the Peshmerga under Barzani were successful against Iranian forces, ambushing the first Iranian units to reach Qahrawa, killing 21, wounding 17 and capturing 40, making it the first victory for the Mahabad Republic.

The Mahabad peshmerga also engaged Iranian reconnaissance teams in the region throughout early May 1946. Kurdish offensives were limited to minor skirmishes due to the removal of Soviet influence in the region that month, possibly due to a Soviet-Iranian oil agreement. A ceasefire agreement, signed on May 3, 1946, between Kurdish forces and Iranian General Ali Razmara, discouraged major attacks, promoted withdrawals, and allowed each side to further equip their forces in the region.

On June 15, 1946, this period of preparation ended, as the fighting positions of the Second Kurdish Regiment at Mamashah (Mil Qarani) were attacked by two Iranian battalions supported by artillery, tanks, and aircraft. The resulting Kurdish defeat enabled the Iranian military to seize the highlands, erect military watchtowers, and maintain a military presence in the area. Lack of tribal unity promoted deterioration of the Mahabad Republic following the Battle of Mamashah.

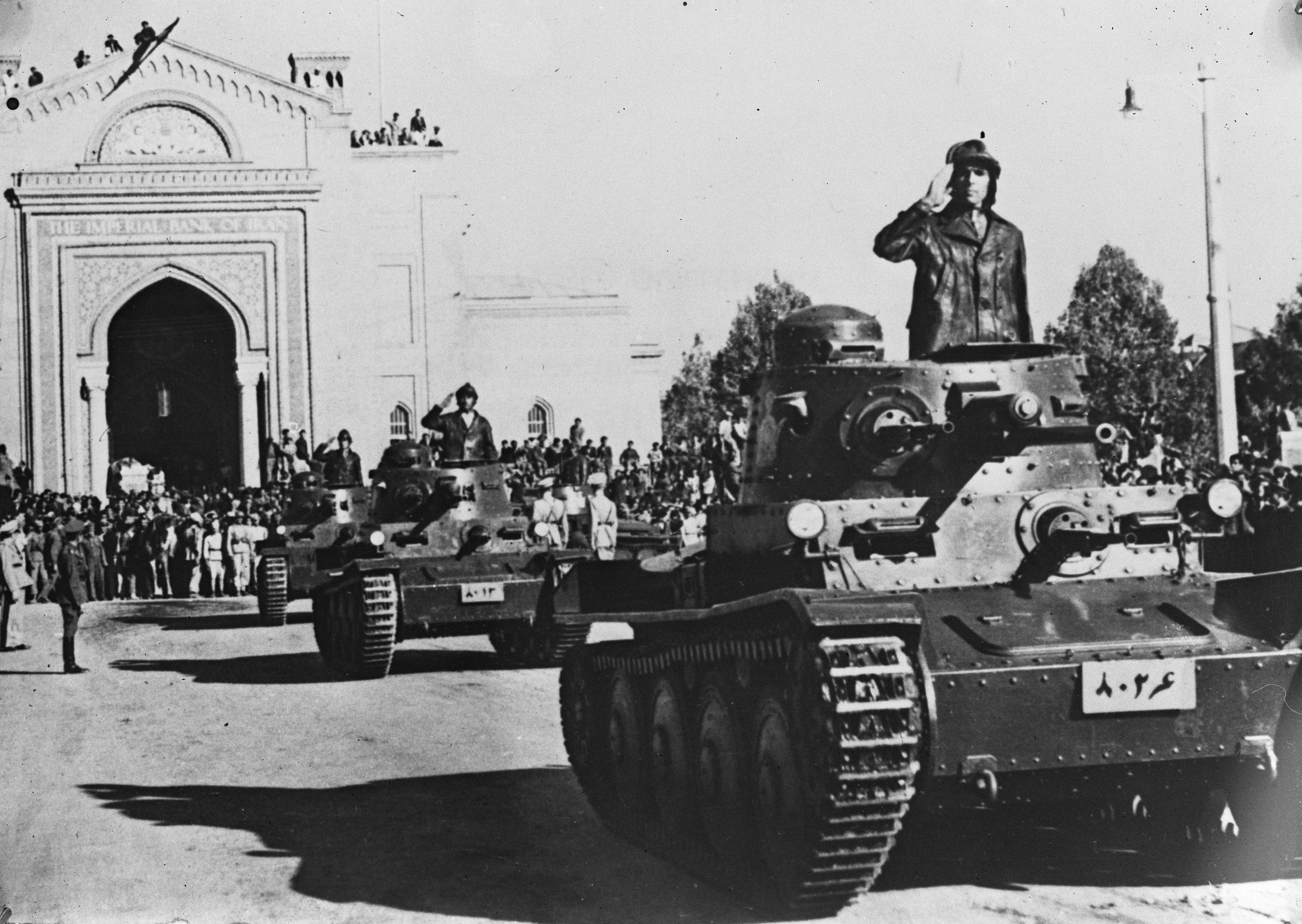
Military parade in Tehran in celebration of Azerbaijan capitulation, December 15, 1946

As tribal support for Qazi Muhammad's government waned, the Barzani Peshmerga were left as Mahabad's lone fighting force. As a result, the Mahabad position became hopeless by late 1946, as even promised Soviet aid failed to arrive. The Mahabad Republic faced its most difficult challenge as Iranian forces planned to reclaim Mahabad, following the seizure of Iranian Azerbaijan in December 1946. Though some opposition remained, eventually the sides turned to negotiations. The Barzanis, including the Peshmerga and their families, withdrew to Naqada on December 15, 1946, and the Iranian military entered Mahabad, officially ending the one-year life of the Kurdish Republic.

Despite the attempts to disarm Mahabad forces, the Peshmerga succeeded in smuggling out much of their weaponry. In March 1947, they faced their Iranian foes once again. In various battles throughout mid-March, the Peshmerga defended themselves against numerous offensives as Iranian forces continued their attacks, often recruiting rival Kurdish tribes to oust the Barzanis. The Peshmerga even achieved several victories, among which was the Battle of Nalos (1947), where Peshmerga forces effectively used their artillery to kill many Iranian soldiers, including Colonel Kalashi, the Iranian regiment commander, and took many prisoners of war. The ambush of an Iranian military column also resulted in the deaths of fifty Iranian soldiers and the capture of Iranian Lieutenant Jahanbani, son of General Jahanbani. However, with his forces withering under the continuous attack, Mustafa Barzani realized the need to flee Iran and crossed the border into Iraqi Kurdistan.

The Peshmerga and Barzani leadership crossed into Iraq in two waves, and though successful in overcoming the Iraqi police and jash forces, whom they met on their way to Barzan, Sheikh Ahmed Barzani was arrested by the Iraqi government and Mustafa Barzani was requested to surrender. When the Iraqis began to mobilize troops to seek Mustafa's defeat and surrender, he decided on evacuation towards the Soviet Union. The journey began in May 1947, with the forces of Barzani engaging in skirmishes with the Iranian military on their way.

On June 9, 1947, the Peshmerga attacked the flank of an army column. During the two-pronged attack, led by both Mustafa Barzani and As'ad Khoshavi, the Peshmerga killed hundreds of Iranian soldiers, destroyed several tanks, knocked out an artillery battery and downed an Iranian aircraft. After evading or engaging the Iranian army throughout their trip, the Barzanis, along with over 500 Peshmerga and their families, crossed the Araxes River into the Soviet Union on June 18, 1947.

== Diplomatic pressure and support ==
The United States exerted intense pressure on the Soviet Union in stages to force the withdrawal of the Red Army from Iran and reduce Soviet influence. Following an official U.S. protest, the United Nations Security Council passed Resolution 2, on January 30, 1946. On March 24, Stalin ordered the withdrawal of Soviet troops from Iran by April 30, 1946. The Soviet troops left as of May 6.

In a second stage through the spring, the U.S. supported the Iranian complaint against Soviet actions lodged with the Security Council in Resolution 3 and Resolution 5.

In a third stage in mid December 1946, the U.S. supported the shah's government in sending the Iranian army to re-occupy Mahabad and Azerbaijan. The leaders of the Azerbaijan enclave in Iran fled to the Azerbaijan SSR, and the leaders of the Kurdish Republic were tried and sentenced to death. They were hanged in Chwarchira Square in the center of Mahabad in 1947.

A fourth stage was initiated in 1947 and centered on the issue of Soviet designs on Iran's northern oil resources. Following the election that year of a new Majlis, the newly elected deputies were reluctant to ratify the Soviet-Iranian oil agreement, which had been concluded under duress in March 1946 and had granted the Soviets 51% ownership and de facto control. On September 11, 1947, U.S. ambassador George V. Allen publicly decried intimidation and coercion used by foreign governments to secure commercial concessions in Iran, and promised full U.S. support for Iran to freely decide about its own natural resources. With this unequivocal encouragement, the Majlis refused to ratify the Soviet oil agreement on October 22, 1947; the vote was 102 to 2.

== Cold War ==
This conflict was a major episode which occurred during the aftermath of the Second World War and was a prelude to the Cold War, it was a factor in the evolving and increasingly contentious political relationship between the United States and the Soviet Union, which followed their joint victory in World War II. According to Lenczowski, U.S. President Truman's actions laid the foundations of U.S. relations with Iran, and were based on his understanding of the nature of the Soviet system and its expansionist proclivities, as well as on his conviction that Soviet threats and aggression should be contained, with force if necessary.

Soviet influence and expansion occurred elsewhere in Southwest Asia also and led to the Truman Doctrine which many historians refer to as the official start of the Cold War. Taking Truman's cue, successive U.S. presidents enlarged and refined their policies toward Iran by extending economic and technical assistance, strengthening its military potential, establishing closer cultural ties, covert political interference with the Majlis, and integrating Iran into the regional security system encompassing the other countries of the 'Northern Tier' of the Middle East and the Persian Gulf.

== See also ==
- Persian Socialist Soviet Republic
- List of modern conflicts in the Middle East
- 1953 Iranian coup d'état
