= List of replaced loanwords in Turkish =

Policy of Turkification of Mustafa Kemal Atatürk

The replacing of loanwords in Turkish was part of a policy of Turkification of Turkey's first President Atatürk. The Ottoman Turkish language had many loanwords from Arabic and Persian, but also European languages such as French, Greek, and Italian origin—which were officially replaced with new or revived Turkish terms suggested by the Turkish Language Association (Turkish: Türk Dil Kurumu, TDK) during the Turkish language reform, as a part of the cultural reforms—in the broader framework of Atatürk's reforms—following the foundation of the Republic of Turkey.

The TDK, established by Atatürk in 1932 to research the Turkish language, also sought to replace foreign loanwords (mainly Arabic) with their Turkish counterparts. The Association succeeded in removing several hundred Arabic words from the language. While most of the words introduced into the language in this process were newly derived from existing Turkish verbal roots, TDK also suggested using old Turkish words which had not been used in the language for centuries; like yanıt, birey, gözgü. Most of these words are widely used today, whereas their predecessors are considered archaic. Some words were used before language reform too but they were used much less than the Persian ones. Some words were taken from rural areas but most of them had different meanings, like ürün. Mongolian also played an important role too, because Mongolian preserved the old Turkic borrowings, such as ulus and çağ.

There are generational differences in vocabulary preference. While those born before the 1940s tend to use the old Arabic-origin words (even the obsolete ones), younger generations commonly use the newer expressions. Some new words have not been widely adopted, in part because they failed to convey the intrinsic meanings of their old equivalents. Many new words have taken up somewhat different meanings, and cannot necessarily be used interchangeably with their old counterpart. Historically, Arabic was the language of the mosque and Persian was the language of education and poetry. A deliberate usage of either (eschewing the usage of a "western" word) often implies a religious subtext or romanticism, respectively. Similarly, the use of European words may be favored to impart a perceived "modern" character. The use of "pure Turkic" words may be employed as an expression of nationalism or as a linguistic "simplification".

== Replaced loanwords of Arabic origin ==
The list gives the Ottoman Turkish word, the modern spelling of the word in Turkish (as suggested by TDK), the modern Turkish equivalent, and its meaning in English. Arabs also used the following words as loanwords for their language.

* Old words that are still used in modern Turkish together with their new Turkish counterparts.
** New words that are not as frequently used as the old words.

Ottoman Turkish word and its transliteration	Modern spelling of the Ottoman Turkish word	Modern Turkish equivalent	Meaning in English	Remarks
عفو ايتمك afv etmek*	affetmek	bağışlamak	to forgive	From the Persian bağışla– "to spare."
اخلاق ahlak*	ahlak	töre	customs, ethics	From the Old Turkic noun töre "customary law."
عائله aile*	aile	ocak**	family	From the Old Turkic noun ocak "hearth."
عقبه akabe	akabe	geçit	passage	From the root geç– "to pass."
عقد akd*, مقاوله mukavele	akit, mukavele	sözleşme, anlaşma, bağıt	contract	From the Old Turkic söz "word."
عقل akl, akıl*	akıl	us**	wisdom	From the Old Turkic noun us "intelligence."
علاقه alaka*	alaka(lı)	ilgi(li)	relevant, related to	From the Old Turkic root il– "to tie loosely" and "to touch."
علامت alamet	alamet	önsezi	premonition	From the adjective ön "front."
عمه amme	amme	sargı	bandage	From the root sar– "to wrap."
عامل amil	amil	etken	factor	From the root et– "to do."
عملیه ameliye	ameliye	işlem	operation, process	From the root işle– "to work."
عامه amme	amme	kamu	public, community	From the Middle Persian adjective "kamu" "all."
عمودی amudi	amudi	dikey	perpendicular; the Arabic survives in the expression amuda kalkmak.	From the root dik– "to plant."
عنعنه a'nane	anane	gelenek, görenek	tradition	Created by İsmet İnönü in 1947, from the root gel– "to come."
عنعنوی a'nanevi	ananevi	geleneksel	customary	Created by İsmet İnönü in 1947, from the root gel– "to come."
عسكر asker*	asker	sü**, çeri**	soldier	The Turkish words are used in specific contexts such as subay, "army officer" and yeniçeri "janissary").
عصر asr*	asır	yüzyıl	century	A compound formed by yüz "one hundred" and yıl "year." The replacement does not preserve the distinction between "century" and "hundred years." The distinction is sometimes important: Speaking in 2020, "yedi asır kadar önce" (some seven centuries ago), has a margin of error of some 60 or 70 years and may refer to 1260–1380, whereas "yedi yüzyıl kadar önce" refers to 1320.
بارز bariz*	bariz	kesin, belli	obvious, accurate	From the root kes– "to cut."
بسیط basit*	basit	kolay	easy, simple	From the noun kol "arm."
بعضی bazı*	bazı	kimi	some (pronoun)	
بیاض beyaz*	beyaz	ak*	white	The Arabic word and the Turkish word are used in somewhat different contexts: "beyaz" translates as "fair" or "(white) clean"
جامعه cami'a*	camia	topluluk	community	From the adjective toplu "collective."
جبراً cebren	cebren	zorla	forcefully	From the Persian loanword zor "force."
جلسه celse	celse	oturum	(law) hearing, session	From the root otur– "to sit."
جماعت cema'at*	cemaat	kurultay	society	From the Mongolian kurilta "assembly of the nobles."
جمعیت cem'iyet*	cemiyet	toplum	society	From the adjective toplu "collective."
جنوب cenub	cenup	güney	south	From the old Turkic Gün "sun" or "day," conserved in some Anatolian dialects to mean "sunny place."
جراحت cerahat	cerahat	irin	pus	
جریان cereyan*	cereyan	akım	flow	From the root ak– "to flow."
جواب cevab*	cevap	yanıt	answer	From the Old Turkic noun yanut.
جهاز cihaz*	cihaz	aygıt	apparatus	
جواری civarı*	civarı	dolayları	approximately, around	
جمله cümle*	cümle	tümce**	sentence	From the noun tüm "all, entire."
دفعه def'a*, کره kere*	defa, kere	kez	times (repetition)	Both defa and kere are still in popular use.
دفینه define*	define	gömü**	treasure	From the root göm– "to bury."
دلیل delil*	delil	kanıt	evidence	
دور devr*	devir	çağ	era	Borrowed from Mongolian, which itself is from Old Turkic çak.
دوره devre*	devre	dönem	semester	From the root dön– "to turn."
ابعاد eb'ad	ebat	boyut	dimension, size	From the noun boy "length"
ابدی ebedi*	ebedî	sonsuz	forever	The Turkish word literally means "without-end."
جد cedd	cet	ata	ancestry	The Turkish word literally means "father."
اجل ecel*	ecel	ölüm	(predestined time of) death	From the root öl– "to die."
اجنبی ecnebi	ecnebi	el, yad	stranger, foreigner	
ادبیات edebiyat*	edebiyat	yazın**	literature	From the root yaz– "to write."
اهمیت ehemmiyet	ehemmiyet	önem	importance	
البسه elbise*	elbise	giysi	cloth	From the root giy– "to wear."
امر emir*	emir	buyruk	order, command	From the Old Turkic noun buyruk.
امنیت emniyet*	emniyet	güvenlik	security	From the noun güven "trust."
اثر eser*	eser	yapıt	production (music, film)	From the root yap– "to make."
اسیر esir*	esir	tutsak	hostage	From the root tut– "to hold."
اطراف etraf*	etraf	ortalık	surroundings, surrounding area	From the adjective orta "middle."
اوراق evrak*	evrak	belge	paper document	In Arabic, evrāk is the plural of vārāk; in modern Turkish, evrak is used as often a singular, although it should be used as a plural of varak.
أول evvel*	evvel	önce	before	Using the adjective ön "front" as a prefix.
فعال fa'al*	faal	etkin	active	From the root et– "to do."
فائض faiz*	faiz	ürem**, getiri	interest (monetary)	From the root ür– "to produce."
فقیر fakir*	fakir	yoksul	poor	From the root yok– "to not exist."
فرض farz*	farz	varsayım	assumption	From the root varsay– "to suppose."
فائده faide*	fayda	yarar	benefit, utility	
فن fenn*, علم ilm*	fen, ilim	bilim	science	From the root bil– "to know."
فیضان feyezan	feyezan	taşkın	flood	From the root taş– "to overflow."
فرقه fırka*	fırka	topluluk	group	From the adjective toplu "collective."
فرقت fırkat	fırkat	ayrılık	disparity	From the Old Turkic root ayr– "to separate."
فكر fikr, fikir*	fikir	görüş	opinion	From the root gör– "to see."
فعل fi'il*	fiil	eylem	verb	From the root ey– "to do."
غرب garb	garp	batı	west	From the root bat– "to sink."
غیر gayr	gayri	olmayan, başka, dışı	non-, other	
غذا gıda*, gıza	gıda	besin	food	
حادثه hadise*	hadise	olay	event, happening, fact, occurrence	From the root ol-, meaning "to be", "to become".
حافظه hafıza*	hafıza	bellek	memory	The new word is commonly used in electronics, like computer memory, i.e. önbellek for cache
خفیف hafif*	hafif	yeğni**	light (in weight)	The Turkish word is rarely used.
حفریات hafriyat	hafriyat	kazı	excavation	From the root kaz-, meaning "to dig".
حق hakk*	hak	pay	portion	
حقیقت hakikat*	hakikat	gerçek	reality	
حاكم hakim*	hâkim	yargıç	judge	
حال hal, وضعیت vaz'iyet*	hâl, vaziyet	durum	situation	From the root dur– "to halt."
خلیطه halita	halita	alaşım	alloy	
حامل hamile*	hamile	gebe	pregnant	
خراب harab*	harap	yıkık	ruin	From the root yık– "to destroy."
حرارت harâret	hararet	ısı, sıcaklık	heat, temperature	The old word can be used in both meanings in Turkish language.
حركت hareket*	hareket	devinim**	movement, motion	
حرف harf*	harf	yazaç, imce**	letter	
حسرة hasra*	hasret	özlem	longing	
حساس hassas*	hassas	duyarlı	sensitive	From the root duy– "to feel."
حشره haşere*	haşere	böcek	insect	
خطا hatâ*, قصور kusûr*	hata, kusur	yanlış	mistake	
حطب hatb	hatab	odun	wood	
ﺧﻄﻮﺍﺕ hatavat	hatavat	adımlar	steps	
خاطره hatıra*	hatıra	anı	memoir	From the root an– "to call to mind."
حیات hayat*, عمر ömr*	hayat, ömür	yaşam, dirim**	life	From the root yaşa– "to live."
حیثیت haysiyet	haysiyet	saygınlık	respectability	From the root say– "to count."
هضم hazm*	hazım	sindirim	digestion	
هدیه hediye*	hediye	armağan	gift	
هيئت hey'et*	heyet	kurul	board (company)	From the root kur– "to set up."
حدت hiddet*	hiddet	kızgınlık, öfke	anger	
حكایه hikaye*	hikâye	öykü	story	Neologism coined by Nurullah Ataç.
خلاف hilâf	hilaf	karşıt	contrary	From the noun karşı "opposite."
حس hiss*	his	duygu	feeling	From the root duy– "to feel."
حدود hudut	hudut	sınır	border.	Sınır is a Greek borrowing.
حقوق hukuk*	hukuk	tüze**	(judiciary) law	From the Old Turkic root tuz– "to command."
خلاصه hulasa	hulasa	özet	summary	
خصوص husus*	husus	konu	subject	Coined in 1935 from the root kon– "to be placed."
حضور huzur*	huzur	dirlik**	comfort	
حجره hücre*	hücre	göze**	cell	
هجوم hücum*	hücum	saldırı	attack	From the root saldır– "to attack."
حرمت hürmet*	hürmet	saygı	respect	From the root say– "to count."
ارثیت irsiyet	irsiyet	kalıtım	heredity	From the root kal– "to remain."
اصرار ısrar*	ısrar	üsteleme	insisting	From the adjective üst "above."
اصطلاح ıstılah	ıstılah	terim	term	Borrowed from Persian.
اجتماع içtima	içtima	kavuşum	new moon (astronomy)	
اجتماعی ictimai	içtimai	toplumsal	communal	From the adjective toplu "collective."
اداره idare*	idare	yönetim	administration	From the root yönet– "to give direction."
ادرار idrar*	idrar	sidik	urine	The original meaning of the Arabic word is "the action of yielding milk". The Turkish word is derived from an old Turkic verb siymek, meaning "to urinate".
افاده ifade*	ifade	anlatım	narration	From the root anlat– "to explain."
افتخار iftihâr*	iftihar	övünme	pride	From the root öv– "to praise."
احتراس ihtiras	ihtiras	tutku	passion	From the root tut– "to hold."
احتوا ihtiva	ihtiva etmek	içermek	to comprise	From the adjective iç "inside."
احتياج ihtiyac*	ihtiyaç	gereksinme, gereksinim	need	iħtiyāj is an Arabic verbal-noun form of iħtāj, meaning "need"
اختيار ihtiyar*	ihtiyar	yaşlı	old (age)	From the noun yaş "age."
احتياط ihtiyat	ihtiyat	yedek	backup, spare	
احتياطلی ihtiyatlı*	ihtiyatlı	uyanık	wide-awake	From the root uyan– "to arouse."
اقتباس iktibas	iktibas	alıntı	copying (in literature; referencing)	From the root al– "to take"
الهه ilahe	ilahe	tanrıça	goddess Tanrı (God) + –ça of Serbo-Croatian	Serbo-Croat supplied the feminine suffix, –ça, which Turkish lacked.
علاوه 'ilave*	ilave	ek	addition	
الهام ilham*	ilham	esin	inspiration	
عمار 'imar*	imar	bayındırlık**	construction, development	
امكان imkân*	imkân	olanak	opportunity, possibility	From the root ol– "to exist."
املا imlâ*	imla	yazım	orthography	From the root yaz– "to write."
امتداد imtidad	imtidad	uzay	space	From the root uza– "to extend."
امتحان imtihân	imtihan	sınav, yazılı	examination	From the Tatar root sına– "to test."
امتياز imtiyâz*	imtiyaz	ayrıcalık	privilege	From the adjective ayrı "separate."
انحسار inhisâr	inhisar	tekel	monopoly	Ömer Asım Aksoy coined from tekel "single hand."
انطباع intiba	intiba	izlenim	impression	
انتخاب intihab	intihab	seçim	election	From the root seç– "to choose."
انتحال intihal	intihal	aşırma	plagiarism	From the root aşır– "to steal."
ابتدائی ibtidâ‘î	iptidai	ilkel	primary; primitive	From the word ilk "first."
ارتفاع irtifâʻ*	irtifa	yükseklik	altitude	The old word is only used in aviation, as in "the altitude of the plane".
ارثی irsî*	irsî	kalıtsal, kalıtımsal	hereditary	From the root kal– "to remain."
اسم ism*	isim	ad	name	
اسكان iskan*	iskân	konut	abode	From the root kon– "to settle."
استخدام istihdam*	istihdam	dağıtım	distribution	From the root dağıt– "to distribute."
استحصال istihsal	istihsal	üretim	production	From the root üret– "to produce."
استقامت istikamet*	istikamet	yön	direction	
استقلال istiklal*	istiklal	bağımsızlık	independence, freedom	From the noun bağ "tie, bond, impediment."
استراحت istirâhat*	istirahat	dinlenme	rest	From the root dinlen– "to rest."
استثمار istismar*	istismar	sömürge	colony	From the root sömür– "to exploit."
استثقال istiskal	istiskal	aşağılama	abasement	
استثنا istisna*	istisna	aykırı	exception	
اشارت işaret*	işaret	gösterge	indicator	From the root göster– "to show."
اشتغال iştigal	iştigal	uğraş, uğraşı	occupation	
اشتراك iştirak*	iştirak	ortaklık	association	
اتمام itmam*	itmam	tamamlama	completion	From the adjective tam "complete, full."
ایضاح izah*	izah	açıklama	clarification	From the root aç– "to open."
ازدواج izdivac	izdivaç	evlilik	marriage	From the noun ev "house."
قابلیت kâbiliyet*	kabiliyet	yetenek, yeti	talent, ability	From the root yet– "to reach."
قادر kader*	kader	yazgı	fate	From the root yaz– "to write."
قفه kafa*	kafa	baş	head	
كافی kafi	kâfi	yeter	enough	From the root yet– "to be enough."
قاعده ka'ide	kaide	taban	floor	
كائنات ka'inat*	kâinat	evren	universe	
قلب kalb*	kalp	yürek	heart	
قانون kanan*	kanun	yasa	law	Borrowed from Mongolian.
قانون اساسى kanunuesasi	kanunuesasi	anayasa	constitution (law)	Literally "mother law."
قافیه kâfiye*	kafiye	uyak	rhyme	From the root uy– "to comply, fit."
كانون اول kanan-ı evvel		aralık	December	"Aralık" was adopted during the drafting of the 1945 Constitution because it occurred in the text. With the new name for December it became the subject of jokes on the theme that the transition from December to January—Aralıktan Ocağa—now meant passing through the gap into the fire.
كانون ثانی kanan-ı sânî		ocak	January	"Ocak," the new name for January preserves the meaning of kânun "hearth."
كلمه kelime*	kelime	sözcük, söz	word	Invented by Melih Cevdet Anday in 1958.
قرمزی kırmızı* ( actually has persian root)	kırmızı	al**, kızıl	red	The Arabic and the Turkish words are used in somewhat different contexts. kızıl is mostly used for red hair.
قسم kısm*	kısım	bölüm	part	From the root böl– "to divide."
كتاب kitab*	kitap	betik**	book	From the Old Turkic root biti– "to write". Some say it is a loanword from Chinese word 筆, meaning "brush" but it lacks evidence
كفر küfr*	küfür	sövme**	curse	From the root söv– "to swear, curse."
قوت kuvvet*	kuvvet	güç, erk	power, force	In physics, the old word is used for "force" and the new word is used for "power".
كلیت külliyet	külliyet	tüm	whole	
كره küre*	küre	yuvar**	sphere	
لطیفه latife	latife	şaka	joke	The new word is also of Arabic origin (from the word şaḳā (شقاء)), meaning "pity, being unfortunate"
لسان lisan*	lisan	dil	language	dil means both tongue in the physical sense and language, while "lisan" only means tongue in the language sense.
لغات lügat	lügat	sözlük	dictionary	
لزوملو lüzumlu*	lüzumlu	gerekli	necessary	
ﻣﻌﺎﺭﻒ ma'arif	maarif	eğitim	education	
معاش ma'aş*	maaş	aylık	salary	From the noun ay "moon, month"
معبد ma'bed*	mabet	tapınak	temple	From the root tap– "to worship."
مادی maddi*	maddi	özdeksel**	material, materialistic	The Turkish word is exclusively used in the context of philosophy.
مفصل mafsal	mafsal	eklem	ligament	The old word is used for "hinge" (non-anatomical).
مغدور mağdur*	mağdur	kıygın**	wronged, injured	The new word is almost never used.
مغلوبیت mağlubiyat*	mağlubiyet	yenilgi	defeat	From the root yen– "to defeat."
محلى mahalli	mahalli	yöresel	regional	
محفوظ mahfuz	mahfuz	saklı	hidden	From the root sakla– "to hide."
مخلوق mahluk	mahluk	yaratık	creature	From the root yarat– "to create."
محصول mahsul*	mahsul	ürün	product	The new word actually meant "weed".
مخصوص mahsûs*	mahsus	özgü	peculiar	
مقصد maksad*, غایه gaye*, هدف hedef*	maksat, gaye, hedef	amaç, erek	goal	
معقول ma'kul*	makul	uygun, elverişli	reasonable	From the root uy– "to comply."
معنه ma'na*	mana	anlam	meaning	From the root anla– "to comprehend."
معنوی manevî*	manevî	tinsel**	moral, spiritual	The Turkish word is exclusively used in the context of philosophy.
مانع mani'	mani	engel	obstacle	
مصرف masraf*	masraf	gider, harcama	cost	From the root git– "to go, leave."
مطبعه matba'a*	matbaa	basım evi	printing	From the root bas– "to press."
مبدأ mebde'	mebde	başlangıç	beginning	
مجاز mecaz, استعاره isti'are	mecaz	iğretileme, eğretileme	metaphor	Arabic word almost only used in literature.
مجبور mecbur*	mecbur	zorunlu	obligation, obligatory	Both the new and the old words can be used as either a noun or an adjective.
مجهول mechul*	meçhul	bilinmeyen	unknown	From the root bil– "to know."
مدنی medeni*	medeni	uygar	civil	Borrowed from Uyghur.
مدنیت medeniyet*	medeniyet	uygarlık	civilization	From the name of the Uyghur Uygur, who established an advanced civilization in Eastern Turkestan in the tenth to twelfth centuries.
مفهوم mefhum	mefhum	kavram	concept	From the root kavra– "to grasp, understand."
مکروه mekrıh	mekruh	iğrenç	disgusting	
مملكت memleket*	memleket	ülke	country	The old word is used for "one's native region"
ﻣﻨﺸﺄ menşe'	menşe	kök	root	
مراسم merasim	merasim	tören	ceremony	
مساحه mesaha	mesaha	yüzölçüm	area, measure of	From the root ölç– "to measure."
مرثیه mersiye	mersiye	ağıt	elegy	
مسافه mesafe*	mesafe	uzaklık	distance	From the root uza– "to extend."
مثانه mesane*	mesane	sidik kesesi	urinary bladder	
مثلا mesela*	mesela	örneğin	for example	
مسعود mes'ud*	mesut	mutlu, sevinçli	happy	Arabic word almost never used alone in daily speech, mostly used together with the new word in the saying "mutlu mesut".
مسؤولیت mes'uliyet	mesuliyet	sorumluluk	responsibility	
مشهور meşhur*	meşhur	ünlü	famous	From the noun ün "fame."
مشروبات meşrubat*	meşrubat	içecek	beverage	From the root iç– "to drink."
موقع mevki' مكان mekan*	mevki, mekân	yer, konum	location	From the root kon– "to settle."
موضع mevzi'	mevzi	bölge	location	From the root böl– "to divide."
میدان meydan*, ساحه saha	meydan, saha	alan**	open area, plaza	While the new word is used mainly in mathematics (as in the "area" of a triangle), it is seldom used with the same meaning of the old words except in compound words like havaalanı (airport), not hava meydanı (older version).
میل meyl	meyil	eğim, eğilim	inclination	From the root eğil– "to incline."
مزار mezar*	mezar	gömüt**	cemetery	From the root göm– "to bury."
منطقه mıntıka	mıntıka	bölge	region	From the root böl– "to divide."
ملت millet*	millet	ulus	nation	From the Mongolian noun uluş "confederation of people."
ميراث miras*	miras	kalıt**	inheritance	From the root kal– "to remain."
مسافر misafir*	misafir	konuk	guest	From the root kon– "to settle."
مثال misal*	misal	örnek	example	
مسكين miskin*	miskin	uyuşuk, mıymıntı	lazy	From the root uyuş– "to numb."
معامله mu'amele*	muamele	davranış	treatment, behavior	From the root davran– "to behave."
معما mu'amma	muamma	bilmece	puzzle, trivia	From the root bil– "to know."
معاصر mu'asır	muasır	çağdaş, güncel	contemporary	
معاون mu'avin*	muavin	yardımcı	helper	
معجزه mu'cize*	mucize	tansık**	miracle	The new word is almost never used.
مغدی mugaddi	mugaddi	besleyici	nourisher	
مغالطه mugalata	mugalata	yanıltmaca	deceptive statement	From the root yanılt– "to mislead."
مغنی، مغنیه muganni, muganniye	muganni, muganniye	şarkıcı	singer	
مغایرت mugayeret	mugayeret	aykırılık	irregularity	
مغایر mugayir	mugayir	aykırı	irregular	The old word has only remained as a legal term meaning "adverse".
مخابره muhabere	muhabere	iletişim, iletişme	communication	From the root ilet– "to transmit."
مهاجرت muhaceret	muhaceret	göç	emigration	From the root göç– "to move."
مهاجم muhacim	muhacim	saldıran, saldırıcı	attacker, offender	From the root saldır– "to attack."
مهاجر muhacir	muhacir	göçmen	immigrant	From the root göç– "to move."
محدب muhaddeb	muhaddep	dış bükey	convex	From the root bük– "to bend."
محافظه muhafaza*	muhafaza	koruma	conservation	From the root koru– "to protect."
محافظ muhafız	muhafız	koruyucu	protector	From the root koru– "to protect."
محاكمه muhakeme*	muhakeme	yargılama, uslamlama	judgment, argumentation	
محقق muhakkak*	muhakkak	kesin(likle)	certain(ly)	
محقق muhakkik	muhakkik	soruşturmacı	investigator	From the root sor– "to ask."
محال muhal	muhal	olanaksız	impossible	From the root ol– "to exist."
مخالفت muhalefet*	muhalefet	karşıtlık	opposition	From the adjective karşı "opposite."
مخمن muhammen	muhammen	oranlanan, ön görülen	pre-determined	
مخمس muhammes	muhammes	beşgen	pentagon	From the noun beş "five."
محاربه muharebe, حرب harb	muharebe, harp	savaş	war	
محارب muharib	muharip	savaşçı	warrior	
محرر muharrer	muharrer	yazılı, yazılmış	written	From the root yaz– "to write."
محرك muharrik	muharrik	kışkırtıcı, ayartıcı	provoker	From the root kışkırt– "to provoke."
محاصره muhasara	muhasara	kuşatma	siege	From the root kuşat– "to encircle."
محاسبه muhasebe*	muhasebe	saymanlık**	accounting, bookkeeping	From the root say– "to count."
محاسبجی muhasebeci*	muhasebeci	sayman**	accountant, bookkeeper	From the root say– "to count."
محتمل muhtemel*	muhtemel	olası	possible	From the root ol– "to happen."
محتویات muhteviyat	muhteviyat	içindekiler	ingredients	From the adjective iç "inside."
مقدس mukaddes	mukaddes	kutsal	sacred	
منتظم muntazam	muntazam	düzgün, düzenli	tidy	From the root düz– "to align."
مربع murabba'	murabba	kare	square	A loanword from the French carré.
معتدل mu'tedil	mutedil	ılım(lı)	moderate(ly)	
موفقیت muvaffakıyyet	muvaffakiyet	başarı	success	From the root başar– "to succeed (in)."
مبالغه mübalaga	mübalağa	abartı	exaggeration	From the root abart– "to exaggerate."
مجادله mücadele*	mücadele	çaba, uğraş	endeavor	
مجرد mücerrit	mücerrit	soyut	abstract	From the root soy– "to strip."
مدافعه müdafa'a	müdafaa	koruma	sustain, protect, defend	From the root koru– "to protect."
مداخله müdahale*	müdahale	karışma	intervention	From the root karış– "to interfere, meddle with."
ملازم mülazım	mülazım	teğmen	lieutenant	From the Old Turkic teğ– "to touch," which Turkish retains as değ–.
مدت müddet*	müddet	süre	duration	From the root sür– "to last."
مدركه müdrike	müdrike	entelekt	intellect (in psychology)	A loanword from the French intellect
مؤدب mü'eddeb	müeddep	uslu	well behaved, demure	From the noun us "intelligence."
مؤلفات mü'elleffat	müellefat	(yazılı) yapıt	(written) piece	From the root yap– "to make."
مؤلف، محرر mü'ellif, muharrir	müellif, muharrir	yazar	writer	From the root yaz– "to write."
مؤمن mü'emmen	müemmen	sağlanmış	secured	From the adjective sağ "alive."
مؤنث mü'ennes	müennes	dişil	feminine	
مؤسسه mü'essese	müessese	kurum	foundation	From the root kur– "to set up." Kurum is recorded in Tarama Sözlüğü (1963–77) as occurring in two dictionaries from the fourteenth and eighteenth century.
مؤثر mü'essir	müessir	dokunaklı	touching	From the root dokun– "to touch."
مؤسس mü'essis	müessis	kurucu	founder	From the root kur– "to set up."
مفكره müfekkire	müfekkire	düşünce gücü	thought capacity	From the root düşün– "to think."
مفرد müfred	müfret	tekil	singular	From the adjective tek "single."
مفلس müflis	müflis	batkın	one that's gone bankrupt	From the root bat– "to sink."
مهم mühim*	mühim	önemli	important	From the noun önem "importance."
مؤمن mü'min	mümin	inanan, inançlı	believer	From the root inan– "to believe."
مناسبت münasebet*	münasebet	ilişki	relation	From the Old Turkic root il– "to tie loosely" and "to touch."
منتخب müntehib	müntehip	seçmen	voter	From the root seç– "to choose."
مراجعت müraca'at	müracaat	başvuru	application	From the root başvur– "to apply."
مركب mürekkeb	mürekkep	birleşmiş, birleşik	ink	From the root birleş– "to unite."
مرتب mürrettib	mürettip	dizgici	type setter	From the root diz– "to align."
مسابقه müsabaka	müsabaka	karşılaşma	match, competition	From the adjective karşı "opposite."
مسامحه müsamaha	müsamaha	hoşgörü	tolerance	From the root gör– "to see."
مساوی müsavi	müsavi	eşit	equal	From the noun eş "pair."
مسدس müseddes	müseddes	altıgen	hexagon	From the noun altı "six."
مستهجن müstehcen*	müstehcen	uygunsuz	inappropriate, obscene	From the root uy– "to comply."
مستملكه müstemleke	müstemleke	sömürge	colony (exploitee)	From the root sömür– "to exploit."
مسوده müsvedde	müsvedde	taslak	draft	
مشابه، مماثل muşabbih, mümassil	müşabih, mümasil	benzer	similar	From the root benze– "to resemble."
مشابهت müşabehet	müşabehet	benzerlik	similarity	From the root benze– "to resemble."
مشخص müşahhas	müşahhas	somut	concrete (in concept, the opposite of abstract)	
مشكل müşkül	müşkül	çetin**	difficult	
مشرك müşrik	müşrik	çoktanrıcı	polytheist	
مشتق müştak	müştak	türev	derivative	Borrowed from Kazakh, where verbs end not in –mek/–mak, but in –v.
مشتكی müşteki	müşteki	yakınan, sızlanan	one who complains, whiner	
مشتملات müştemilat	müştemilat	eklenti	attachment, appendage	From the root ekle– "to add."
مشترك müşterek	müşterek	ortak	partner	From the noun orta "middle."
مشتری müşteri*	müşteri	alıcı, alımcı	customer	From the root al– "to buy."
مطالعه mütala'a	mütalâa	düşünce	thought	From the root düşün– "to think."
متارکه mütareke	mütareke	antlaşma	armistice	From the noun ant "oath."
متعدد müte'addid	müteaddit	birçok	a lot, many	
متعفن müte'affin	müteaffin	kokuşuk	malodorous	From the root kok– "to smell."
متعهد müte'ahhid*	müteahhit	üstenci**	contractor	
متعاقب müte'akib	müteakip	sonra, ardından	after, thereafter	From the adjective arka "behind."
متعاليه müte'aliye	mütealiye	deneyüstücülük	transcendentalism	
متعلق müteallik	müteallik	ilişkin, ilgili	related (to)	From the Old Turkic root il– "to tie loosely" and "to touch."
متعمم müte'ammim	müteammim	yaygınlaşmış, genelleşmiş	something that has widespread	From the root yay– "to radiate."
متعارفه müte'arife	mütearife	belit**	axiom	
متبقی mütebaki	mütebaki	kalan	remaining	From the root kal– "to remain."
متبدل mütebeddil	mütebeddil	değişen, kararsız	one that changes, undecided	From the root değiş– "to change."
متبسم mütebessim	mütebessim	gülümseyen, güleç	one that smiles	From the root gül– "to laugh."
متجانس mütecanis	mütecanis	bağdaşık	homogenous	
متجاوز mutecaviz	mütecaviz	saldırgan	attacker	From the root saldır– "to attack."
متدين mutedeyyin	mütedeyyin	dindar	religious	Borrowed from Kurdish, where it means "religious person."
متأثر müte'essir	müteessir	üzüntülü	sad (person)	From the root üz– "to aggrieve."
متفكر mütefekkir	mütefekkir	düşünür	thinker, intellectual	From the root düşün– "to think."
متفرق müteferrik	müteferrik	dağınık	untidy	From the root dağıt– "to distribute."
متحمل mütehammil	mütehammil	dayanıklı	durable	
متحرك müteharrik	müteharrik	devingen, oynar	mobile	
محترم muhterem*	muhterem	saygıdeğer	honorable	
متخصص mütehassıs	mütehassıs	uzman	expert	From the Old Turkic noun uz "skilled craftsman" and the intensive suffix "–man" in şişman "fat" and kocaman "huge."
متشبث muteşşebbis	müteşebbis	girişimci	entrepreneur	From the root gir– "to enter."
متواضع mütevazı' *	mütevazı	alçakgönüllü	humble	
متوفی müteveffa	müteveffa	ölü, ölmüş	dead	From the root öl– "to die."
متفق müttefik*	müttefik	bağlaşık**	ally	From the root bağla– "to tie."
مزایده müzayede	müzayede	açık arttırma	auction	
مزمن müzmin	müzmin	süreğen	chronic	From the root sür– "to last."
نادر nadir*, اندر ender*	nadir, ender	seyrek	rare(ly)	
نغمه nağme	nağme	ezgi	melody	
ناقص nakıs*	nakıs	eksi	minus	
نصیحت nasihat*	nasihat	öğüt	advice, counsel	
نظیر nazır	nazır	bakan	minister	
نفس nefes*	nefes	soluk	breath	
نفرة nefrat	nefrat	doku	hate	
نسیج nesic	nesiç	doku	tissue	
نسل nesl*	nesil	kuşak	generation	
نتیجه netice*	netice	sonuç	result	From the combination of old Turkic nouns son "end" and uç "latter."
نزیف nezif	nezif	kanama	hemorrhage	From the noun kan "blood"
نصف nısf	nısıf	yarı(m)	half	From the root yar– "to split."
نهایت nihayet*	nihayet	son(unda)	final(ly)	
نكاح nikah*	nikâh	düğün	wedding	In modern Turkish, nikâh is generally used for the wedding ceremony, while düğün is used for the wedding reception or party.
نسبت nisbet*	nispet	oran	ratio	From the Old Turkic noun oran for "measure," "proportion" or "moderation."
نطق nutk*	nutuk	söylev	speech	Borrowed from Kazakh, where verbs end not in –mek/–mak, but in –v.
رفاه refah*	refah	gönenç	prosperity	
رغماً ragmen*	rağmen	karşın	despite, in spite of	From the adjective karşı "opposite."
رئیس re'is	reis	başkan	president	
رأی re'y	rey	oy	vote	
رجعت ric'at*	ricat	çekilme	retreat	From the root çek– "to pull."
روح ruh*	ruh	tin**	spirit	The Turkish word is almost never used, except in the context of philosophy.
رطوبت rutubet*	rutubet	yaşlık, ıslaklık	moisture	From the adjective yaş "dank."
رؤيا rü'ya*	rüya	düş	dream	
سادهّ sade, سائد sa'aid*	sade	yalın	plain	The Turkish word is rarely used.
صفحة safha*	safha	evre, aşama	stage, phase	
صفرا safra*	safra	öd	bile	
ساحل sahil*	sahil	kıyı	coast	
صاحب sahib*	sahip	iye**	owner	The Turkish word is seldom used; however, it is commonly used in the context of grammar when describing the possessive suffix (iyelik eki)
سطح sath	satıh	yüzey	surface	From the noun yüz "face."
سیاره seyyare	seyyare	araba, taşıt	car	Araba is the outdated expression for "car" in Arabic. The current word in Arabic for car is seyyara but in Turkish seyyar, means "transportable" or given to travel.
سبب sebeb*	sebep	neden	reason	
سفارت safarat	sefaret	büyükelçilik	embassy	
سلامت selamet	selamet	esenlik	health, soundness	
سما sema	sema	gök	sky	
سنه sene*	sene	yıl	year	
صحت sıhhat	sıhhat	sağlık	health	From the adjective sağ "alive."
سحر sihr*	sihir	büyü	magic	
صحبت sohbet*	sohbet	söyleşi	chat	From the root söyle– "to say."
سؤال su'al	sual	soru	question	From the root sor– "to ask."
صلح sulh	sulh	barış	peace	
صنع suni'	suni	yapay	artificial	From the root yap– "to make."
سكوت sükut	sükût	sessizlik	silence	From the noun ses "voice."
شاهد şâhid*	şahit	tanık	witness	From the root tanı– "to recognize."
شاعر şa'ir*	şair	ozan	poet	
شعير şe'ir	şeir	arpa	barley	
شرق şark	şark	doğu	east	From the root doğ– "to be born."
شرط şart*	şart	koşul	condition	Coined in 1947 by Nurullah Ataç.
شمال şimal	şimal	kuzey	north	From the noun kuz "side of a mountain out of reach of the sun." Kuzey was also used in some Anatolian dialects, meaning sunless place.
شعاع şu'a'	şua	ışın	ray, gleam	
تعلق taalluk	taalluk	ilinti	connection, relation	From the Old Turkic root il– "to tie loosely" and "to touch."
طبقه tabaka*	tabaka	katman	layer	From the noun kat "floor."
طبيعت tabi'at*	tabiat	doğa	nature	From the root doğ– "to be born."
طبیعی tabi'i*	tabii	doğal	natural	From the root doğ– "to be born."
تعبير، افاده ta'bîr, ifade*	tabir, ifade	deyiş**	narration	
تابعیت tabiiyet	tabiiyet	uyruk	nationality	The word "milliyet" is more commonly used.
تحلیل tahlil*	tahlil	inceleme	(laboratory) test (as in medicine)	
تخمین tahmin*	tahmin	kestirim**	guess, prediction	From the root kes– "to cut."
تعقیب taʻkib*	takip	izlem**	follow-up	From the root izle– "to watch."
طلب ṭaleb*	talep	istek	request, demand, wish	From the root iste– "to demand, request."
طلبه ṭalebe	talebe	öğrenci	student (plural of طالب ṭâlib, "seeker" [of knowledge])	From the Old Turkic root igid– "to feed."
تعمیم tâmîm	tâmîm	genelge	circular, notice	From the adjective genel "general."
تعمير taʻmîr*, تعديلات taʻdîlât*	tamir, tadilat	onarım	repair, renovation	From the root onar– "to repair."
طرف taraf*	taraf	yan	side	
ترصدات tarassut	tarassut	gözetleme	observation	
تاريخ tarih*	tarih	günay**	date (in time)	The Arabic word tarih also means "history". The Turkish word günay (literally meaning "day-month") is rarely used.
تسلط tasallut	tasallut	sarkıntılık	(sexual) harassment	From the root sark– "to dangle from."
تصور tasavvur	tasavvur	canlandırma, tasarı	imagine	
تصدیق tasdik	tasdik	onay	approve	
تصحيح tashîh	tashih	düzeltme	correction	From the adjective düz "even, flat."
تصویر tasvir*	tasvir	betimleme	description	
طیاره tayyare	tayyare	uçak	airplane	From the root uç– "to fly."
توصيه tavsiye*	tavsiye	salık	advice	
تعادل te'adül	teadül	denklik	equivalence	From the adjective denk "equal."
تعامل te'amül	teamül	tepkime, davranış	reaction, behavior	From the root davran– "to behave."
تبسم tebessüm	tebessüm	gülümseme	smile	From the root gül– "to laugh."
تبدیل tebdil	tebdil	değişiklik	change	From the root değiş– "to change."
تبريك tebrîk*	tebrik	kutlama	congratulate	From the root kutla– "to celebrate."
تجلى tecelli	tecelli	belirme	emerge, appear	
تجسم tecessüm	tecessüm	görünme	appearance, manifestation	From the root gör– "to see."
تجربه tecrübe*	tecrübe	deneyim	experience	From the root dene– "to attempt."
تجهیزات techizat*	teçhizat	donanım	equipment	
تداوی tedavi*	tedavi	sağaltım**	therapy	
تدبیر tedbîr*	tedbir	önlem	precaution	From the root önle– "to prevent."
تدریسات tedrisat	tedrisat	öğretim	teaching	
تأثر te'essür	teessür	üzüntü	agony	From the root üz– "to aggrieve."
تكامل tekamül	tekâmül	evrim, başkalaşım	maturation, metamorphosis, evolution	
تقاعد tekaʻüd	tekaüt	emeklilik	retirement	
تكفل tekeffül	tekeffül	yükümlenme	standing surety	
تكلیف teklif*	teklif	öneri	proposal	From the root öner– "to propose."
تكرار tekrar*	tekrar	yine*	again	
تلاش telaş*	telaş	tasa, kaygı	worry	
تمییز temyiz*	temyiz	yargıtay	Court of Cassation (in modern Turkey)	Borrowed from Chagatai.
تناسب tenasüb	tenasüp	uyum	congruity	From the root uy– "to conform."
تنبيه tenbih*	tembih	uyarı	warning	From the root uyar– "to warn."
ترقی teraḳḳi	terakki	ilerleme	progress	
ترجمه tercüme*	tercüme	çeviri	translation	
تردد terreddüd*	tereddüt	duraksama	hesitancy	From the root dur– "to halt, stop."
ترتیب tertib*	tertip	düzen	order, tidiness	From the root düz– "to align."
تأثیر tesir	tesir	etki	effect	From the root et– "to do."
تسلی teselli*	teselli	avunma	console	From the root avun– "to console oneself."
تشخیص teşhis*	teşhis	tanı	diagnosis	From the root tanı– "to recognize."
تشكیلات teşkilat*	teşkilat	örgüt	organization	From the noun örgü "plait."
تشكیل teşkil	teşkil etmek	oluşturmak	to constitute	
تشرین أول teşrin-i evvel		ekim	October	From the root ek– "to harvest."
تشرین ثانی teşrin-i sani		kasım	November	
تشویق teşvik*	teşvik	özendirme, kışkırtma	(providing) incentive, provocation	
تدقیق tedkit*	tetkit	araştırma	research	
تولد tevellüd	tevellüt	doğum	birth	From the root doğ– "to be born."
تذكار tezkar	tezkâr	anılmaya değer	worth-mentioning	From the root an– "to call to mind."
تجارت ticaret*	ticaret	alımsatım	business	
عنصر unsur*	unsur	öğe	constituent, element	
عنوان unvan*	unvan, ünvan	san	(professional) title	
اسلوب üslub*	üslup	biçem**	style	
وعد va'd*	vaat	söz	promise (noun)	
واقعه vak'a*	vaka	olay	event	From the root ol– "to happen."
وقور vakur	vakur	ağır başlı	dignified	The Turkish expression literally means "heavy headed".
وصف vasf*	vasıf	nitelik	feature, quality	
واسطه vasıta	vasıta	araç	vehicle	
وسيع vasi'	vâsi	engin	vast	
وطن vatan*	vatan	yurt	homeland	
وظیفه vazife*	vazife	görev	task, mission	
و ve*	ve	ile	and	From the Old Turkic root il– "to tie loosely" and "to touch."
وهم vehm	vehim	kuruntu	apprehension, fancy	
ولایت vilayet*	vilayet	il	province	
تفسیر tefsir	tefsir	yorum	interpretation, analysis, comment	
ضبط zabıt*	zabıt	tutanak	minute of proceeding, trial	From the root tut– "to hold."
ضمیر zamir*	zamir	adıl**	pronoun	From the noun ad "noun."
زاویه zaviye	zaviye	açı	angle	From the root aç– "to open."
ذی‌قیمت zi-kıymet)	zikıymet	değerli	valuable	The word zikıymet is very rarely used but the word "kıymetli" (also meaning valuable) is used commonly.

== Replaced loanwords of French origin ==
French words started to infiltrate the Turkish language in the time of Franco-Ottoman alliance, and further when administrative reforms (Tanzimat) started taking place in the Ottoman Empire. The extent of French influence was such that the number of French loanwords was close to 5,000.

Most of the French loanwords are still widely used in Turkish today.

* Words that are still used in modern Turkish together with their new Turkish counterparts.

Loanword	Turkish equivalent	Meaning in English	Original French spelling
ajanda *	andaç (replaced with gündem)	agenda	agenda
aksesuar *	süs	accessory (decorative)	accessoire
aktif *	etkin	active	actif
alternatif *	seçenek	alternative (noun)	alternatif
analiz *	çözümleme	analysis	analyse
asimilasyon, anabolizma *	özümleme	assimilation, anabolism	assimilation, anabolisme
astronomi *	gökbilim	astronomy	astronomie
avantaj *	üstünlük	advantage	avantage
done	veri	data	donnée
detay *	ayrıntı	detail	détail
direkt *	doğrudan	directly	direct
dikte *	yazdırım	dictation	dictée
doktrin	öğreti	doctrine	doctrine
doküman *	belge	document	document
domestik *	evcil	domestic	domestique
dominant	baskın	dominant	dominant
egzersiz *	alıştırma	exercise	exercice
endemik *	salgın	endemic	endémique
enerji *	erke	energy	énergie
enflamasyon *	yangı	inflammation	inflammation
enformatik	bilişim	information technology	informatique
enteresan *	ilginç	interesting	intéressant
eritrosit	alyuvar	red blood cell	érythrocyte
eksper *	bilirkişi	expert	expert
faks *	belgeç, belgegeçer	fax	fax
faktör *	etken	factor	facteur
fenomen *	olgu	phenomenon	phénomène
filoloji *	dilbilim	philology	philologie
filtre *	süzgeç	filter	filtre
fizyoloji *	işlevbilim	physiology	physiologie
fonksiyon *	işlev	function	fonction
fotokopi *	tıpkıbasım	photocopy	photocopie
garanti *	güvence	insurance, assurance	garantie
global *	küresel	global	global
gramer	dil bilgisi	grammar	grammaire
grup *	öbek	group	groupe
halüsinasyon *	sanrı	hallucination	hallucination
histoloji	doku bilimi	histology	histologie
homojen *	bağdaşık	homogenous	homogène
hoplamak*	zıplamak	Jump	Oup La
illüzyon *	yanılsama	illusion	illusion
istatistik *	sayımlama	statistics	statistiques
izolasyon *	yalıtım	isolation	isolation
kalite *	nitelik	quality	qualité
kampüs *	yerleşke	campus	campus
kapasite *	sığa, kapsam	capacity	capacité
karakter *	kişilik	character, personality	caractère
kategori *	ulam	category	catégorie
kompleks *	karmaşık	complex	complexe
komünikasyon	iletişim	communication	communication
konsantrasyon *	derişim	concentration	concentration
konsolidasyon *	süreletme	consolidation (economics)	consolidation
kontrol *	denetim	control	contrôle
korelasyon	bağıntı	correlation	corrélation
kramp *	kasınç	(muscle) cramp	crampe
kriter *	ölçüt	criterion	critère
kronik *	süreğen	chronic(al)	chronique
kuaför *	güzellik salonu/berber	beauty/hair salon, barber	coiffeur
külot *	don	underpants	culotte
lenf *	ak kan	lymph	lymphe
liste *	dizelge	list	liste
lökosit	akyuvar	white blood cell	leucocyte
medya *	basın-yayın	media	média
mekanizma *	düzenek	mechanism	mécanisme
meridyen *	boylam	longitude	méridien
mesaj, posta *	ileti	message	message
metamorfoz *	başkalaşım	metamorphosis	métamorphose
metot *	yöntem	method	méthode
monoton *	tekdüze	monotonous	monotone
mobilya *	döşenek	furniture	mobilier
moral *	özgüç	moral	morale
mutasyon *	değişinim	mutation	mutation
normal *	olağan	normal	normal
objektif *	nesnel	objective	objectif
organizasyon *	düzenleme	organization	organisation
orijinal *	özgün	original	original
otorite *	yetke	authority	autorité
over	yumurtalık	ovary	ovaire
paradoks *	çelişki	paradox	paradoxe
paralel *	enlem	latitude	parallèle
parazit *	asalak	parasite	parasite
pasif *	edilgen	passive	passif
performans *	başarım	performance	performance
plaj *	kumsal	beach	plage
plato *	yayla	plateau	plateau
popüler, favori *	gözde	popular, favorite	populaire, favori
prensip *	ilke	principal	principe
prezentasyon	sunum	presentation	présentation
primer	birincil	primary	primaire
problem *	sorun	problem	problème
prodüktör	yapımcı	producer	producteur
program *	izlence	program	programme
proje *	tasarı	project	projet
prosedür *	işlem, işleyiş	procedure	procédure
proses	süreç	process	procès
provokasyon	kışkırtma	provocation	provocation
radyoaktif *	ışın etkin	radioactive	radioactif
randıman *	verim	efficiency	rendement
rapor *	yazanak	report	rapport
rejisör *	yönetmen	director	régisseur
resesif	çekinik	recessive	récessif
restoran *	aşevi	restaurant	restaurant
rezistans	direnç	resistance	résistance
sekunder, sekonder	ikincil	secondary	secondaire
sekreter *	yazman	secretary	secrétaire
sembol *	simge	symbol	symbole
semptom *	belirti	symptom	symptôme
sendrom *	belirge	syndrome	syndrome
sentez *	bireşim	synthesis	synthèse
sistem *	dizge	system	système
simülasyon *	öğrence	simulation	simulation
solüsyon	çözelti	solution	solution
spesifik	özellikli	specific	spécifique
spesiyal	özel	special	spécial
standart *	ölçün	standard	standard
statik *	duruk	static	statique
statü *	durum	status	statut
subjektif *	öznel	subjective	subjectif
teori *	kuram	theory	théorie
tretuvar	kaldırım	pavement / sidewalk	trottoir
tümör *	ur	tumor	tumeur
versiyon *	sürüm	version	version
viraj *	dönemeç	turn (as in traffic)	virage
ultrason *	yansılanım (the act of echoing)	ultrasound	ultrason

== Replaced loanwords of Persian origin ==
The list gives the Ottoman Turkish word, the modern spelling of the word in Turkish (as suggested by TDK), the modern Turkish equivalent, and its meaning in English.

There are around 1,500 Persian words in Turkish. Arabic language and culture is general perceived by Turks to be more "foreign" than Persian language and culture, which had a native presence in Anatolia since the time of the Achaemenids, and was patronised for millennia afterwards by other dynasties with a presence in Anatolia such as the Sasanians, Seleucids, Seljuks, Sultanate of Rum, and lastly, the Ottomans, amongst others.

** New words used simultaneously with old words.

Ottoman Turkish word and its transliteration	Modern spelling of the Ottoman Turkish word	Modern Turkish equivalent	Meaning in English	Remarks
آموزندە amuzende*	amuzende	okutman	lector	
بدبين bedbin*	bedbin	bitki	plant	From the root bit– "to grow."
برابر beraber*	beraber	**birlikte	together	
بوسه buse*	buse	öpücük	kiss	
جنگ cenk*	cenk	savaş	war	
چاره çare*	çare	çözüm	solution	
چهره çehre*	çehre	yüz	face	
چنبر çember*	çember	yuvarlak	circle	
چشيت çeşit*	çeşit	tür	kind, variety	
چهار یک çeyrek*	çeyrek	dörtte bir	quarter	Both the Persian and the Turkish expressions literally mean one in four.
درد dert*	dert	ağrı	pain	
دمار demar*	demar	ölüm	death	From the root öl– "to die."
دیگر diğer*	diğer	öbür, öteki	other	
دشمن düşman*	düşman	yağı	enemy	
دوز düz*	düz	yatay	horizontal	
انديشه endişe*	endişe	kaygı	worry	
فروخت füruht*	füruht	satış	sale	From the root sat– "to sell."
گوشت gûşt*	guşt	et	meat	
گزيده güzide*	güzide	seçkin	élite	
خسته hasta*	hasta	sayrı	patient, sick	The original Persian word actually means tired
همیشه hemîşe*	hemîşe	her zaman	always	
هنوز henüz*	henüz	daha	yet	
خواجه hoca*	hoca	öğretmen	teacher	From the root öğret-, meaning "to teach".
قورناز kurnaz*	kurnaz	açıkgözlü	cunning	
مهتاب mehtap*	mehtap	ay ışığı	moonlight	
محافظه كار* muhafazakar*	muhafazakar	tutucu	conservative	From the root tut– "to hold."
موشكيل-پسند müşkülpesent*	müşkülpesent	titiz	fussy	
نان عزيز nân-ı aziz*	nân-ı aziz	ekmek	bread	
نيكبين nikbin*	nikbin	iyimser	optimist	
پاپوش pabuç*	pabuç	ayakkabı	shoe	Both the Persian and the Turkish words literally mean foot cover.
پ۪يشْدَارْ pişdar*	pişdar	öncü	vanguard	
سرخوش sarhoş*	sarhoş	esrik	drunk	
ساخته* sahte*	sahte	düzmece	fake	From the root düz– "to align."
سر ser*	ser	baş	head	
سربست serbest*	serbest	erkin	free, footloose	
سرسری serseri*	serseri	başıboş	rascal	
سياه siyah*	siyah	**kara	black	
بهار sonbahar*	sonbahar	güz	fall (season)	
سطور sütur*	sütur	binek	ride	From the root bin– "to ride."
شخص şahıs*	şahıs	birey	individual	From the root biregü [< bir+egü "from someone."
شایان şayan*	şayan	değerli	valuable	
شهر şehir*	şehir	kent	city	The word kent is of Sogdian origin, and şehir is still used as a suffix in naming cities i.e Bahçeşehir.
تازه taze*	taze	yeni	new	
تنبل tembel*	tembel	haylaz	lazy	
ویران viran*	viran	yıkık	ruin	
اميد ümit*	ümit	umut	hope	
یاور yaver*	yaver	yardımcı	helper	
يَكْنَسَقْ yeknesak*	yeknesak	tekdüze	monotonous	
یکپاره yekpare*	yekpare	bütün	whole	
زهر zehir*	zehir	ağı	poison, toxin	
زنگین zengin*	zengin	varlıklı	rich	
زور zor*	zor	çetin	difficult	

== Replaced loanwords of other origin ==
* Words that are still used in modern Turkish together with their new Turkish counterparts.
** New words that are not as frequently used as the old words

Loanword	Turkish equivalent	Meaning in English	Origin language	Original spelling	Remarks
angarya *	yüklenti **	drudgery, forced labor	Greek	αγγαρεία (angareia)	The Turkish word is still unused.
endoskopi *	iç görüm ** ("inside seeing")	endoscopy	Greek (via English)		The Turkish word is less common.
fetüs *	dölüt	fetus	Latin	fetus, foetus	The Turkish word is used occasionally.
genetik *	kalıtım (bilimi) ("the science of heredity")	genetics	German	Genetik	Both the loanword and the Turkish word are used.
hegemonya *	boyunduruk	hegemony	Greek	ηγεμονία (igemonia)	The Turkish word is more commonly used.
İnternet *	Genel Ağ **	Internet	English		The Turkish word is still unused.
konsonant	ünsüz	consonant	German	Konsonant	The loanword is now unused.
kundura *	ayakkabı	shoe	Italian	condura	The Turkish word is more commonly used.
otoban *	otoyol	highway	German	Autobahn	Both the loanword and the Turkish word are used.
vokal	ünlü	vowel	German	Vokal	The loanword is now unused.
pezevenk *	dümbük **	pimp	Armenian	բոզավագ (bozavag)	The Turkish word is less common.
keko *	ağabey **	brother, close friend	Kurdish	keko (from kak)	Used colloquially; standard Turkish remains the norm.

== See also ==
- Animal name changes in Turkey
- Geographical name changes in Turkey

== Sources ==
- Yazım Kılavuzu, the official spelling guide of the Turkish language on TDK website
