= Chahar Cheragh Square =

Public square in Mahabad

Coordinates: 36°45′55″N 45°43′18″E

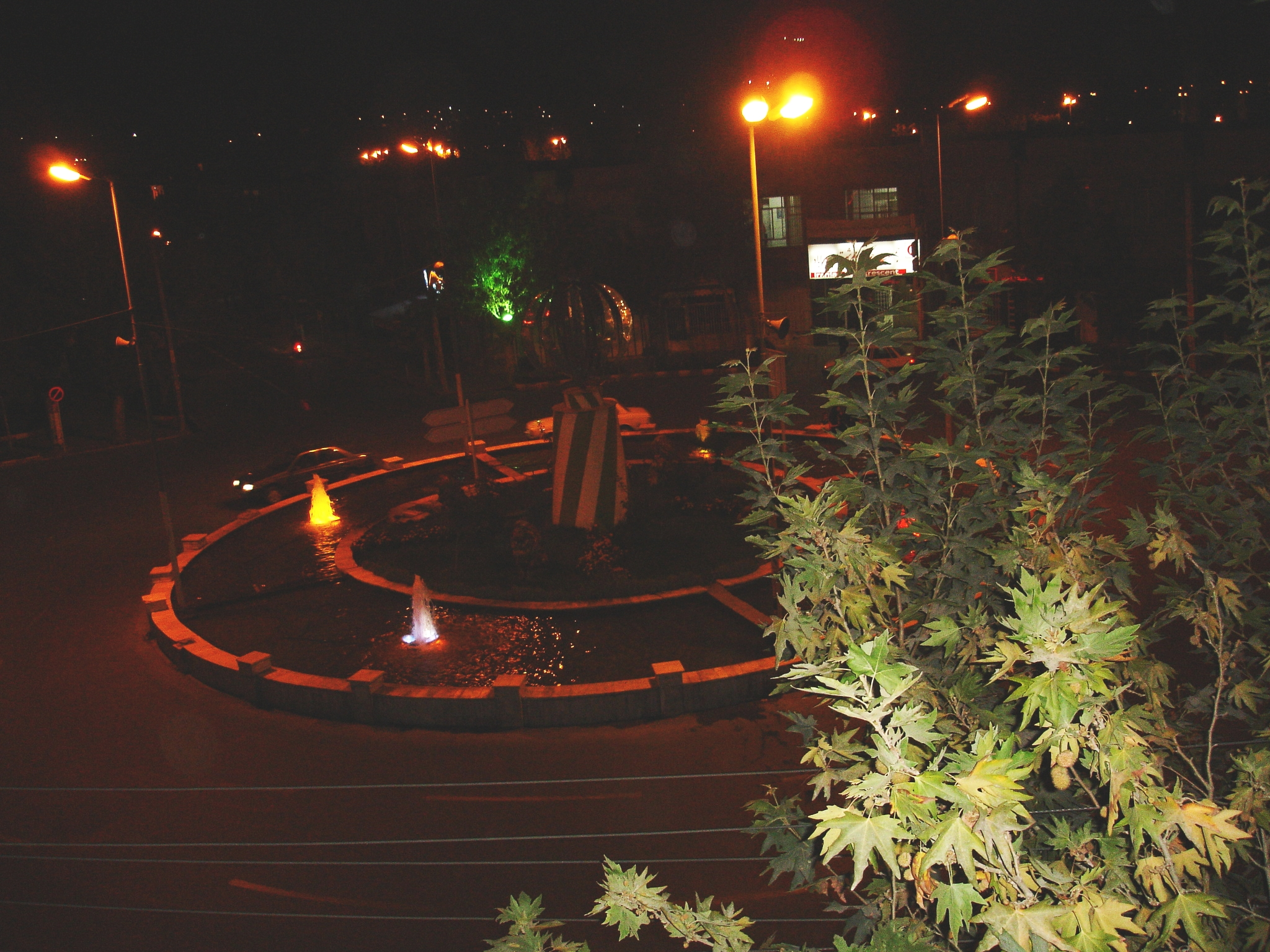
Chahar-cheragh Square at night

Chahar Cheragh or Chuar-chira Square (Sorani Kurdish: چوارچرا, Kurdish: Çar Çira, Persian: میدان چهارچراغ) (meaning Square of the four candles), is a public square in the centre of the city of Mahabad. It is now officially called Shahrdari Square (Municipality Square).

At this place, the Russian-backed Qazi Muhammad proclaimed the Republic of Mahabad in 1946. Here, after restoring Iranian authority and chasing the Russian-backed elements away in 1947, Qazi Muhammad, and other political leaders of the Republic of Mahabad were executed by the Iranian state.
