= Azerbaijani separatism in Iran =

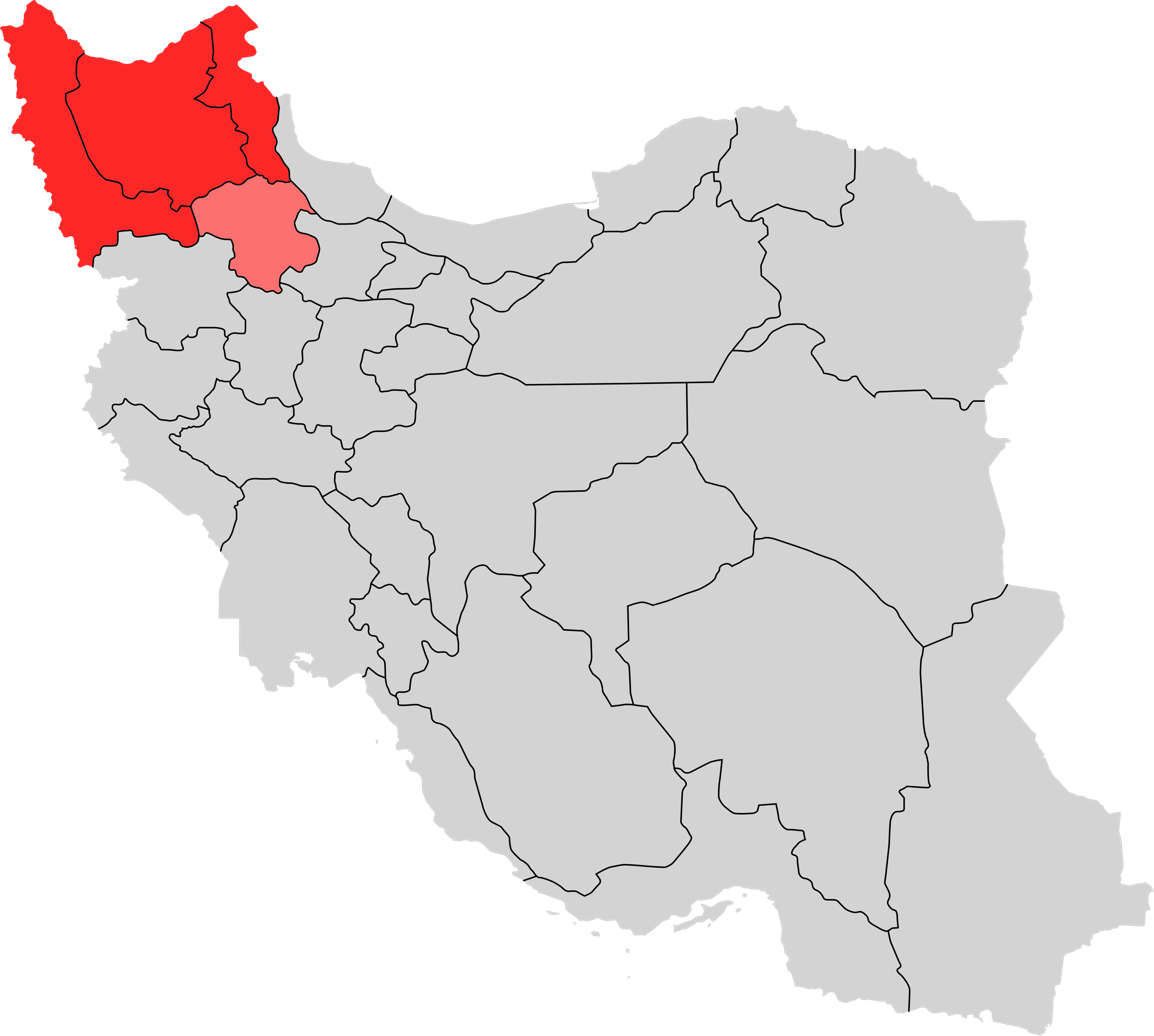
- Map of Iran with Azerbaijan highlighted
Date	1918 – present
Location	Iranian Azerbaijan
Status	Ongoing

Belligerents
Sublime State of Iran (1918–1925); Imperial State of Iran (1925–1979); Interim Government and Council of the Islamic Revolution (1979–1980); Islamic Republic of Iran (since 1980)	Azerbaijani separatists; SANAM; ANRO; Azerbaijan Cultural Society; Azerbaijan Diplomatic Mission; Southern Azerbaijan Diplomatic Commission; South Azerbaijan Independence Party; South Azerbaijan National Liberation Movement; Azerbaijan People's Government (1946); Republic of Mahabad (1946)

Commanders and leaders
(Iran) Reza Shah (Iran) Mohammad Reza Shah (Iran) Ruhollah Khomeini (Iran) Ali Khamenei (Iran) Mostafa Chamran	Ja'far Pishevari; Ahmad Kordary; Piruz Dilanchi; Mahmudali Chehregani

Azerbaijani separatism in Iran refers to an Azerbaijani nationalist and Pan-Turkist movement advocating for the separation of Iranian Azerbaijan from Iran. Azerbaijani separatists referred to Iranian Azerbaijan as "South Azerbaijan", and often advocated separatism as a precursor to Whole Azerbaijan, the union of all ethnic Azerbaijani territories.

== History ==
In 1918, with the efforts of the Musavat Party, Pan-Turkist political elites from the Republic of Azerbaijan began introducing Pan-Turkism to Iranian Azerbaijanis and advocating for the incorporation of Iranian Azerbaijan into the Republic of Azerbaijan. The Baku-based Musavat party addressed the topic of Iranian Azerbaijan for the first time in an editorial that was published in their Açiq Söz newspaper in January 1918. The author accused the Persian ruling class and Russian expansionists of dividing the Azerbaijani nation and vowed that the Azerbaijanis would unite again.

The local Baku chapter of the Iranian Democrat Party responded to these irredentist claims by publishing the bilingual newspaper Azarbayjan, Joz-e la-yanfakk-e Iran ("Azerbaijan, an Inseparable Part of Iran") on 10 February 1918. When the Musavat party established the Azerbaijan Democratic Republic in May 1918, it forced the newspaper to close.

Until the rise of the Pahlavi dynasty, Iranian Azeris ruled Iran through several dynasties. Iranian Azeris were integrated in Iran and considered the most loyal minority. However, Reza Shah wanted to centralize all of Iran in a nation-state centered around the Persian language and culture, coming into conflict with minorities. While the Pahlavi government also came into conflict with Kurds, Baloch, Lurs, and Arabs, the Azeris were suspected the most due to Iranian Azerbaijan being agriculturally rich and a strategic location next to the Soviet Union. In November 1945, Iranian Azerbaijan declared independence. In December 1946, the Pahlavis regained control of Iranian Azerbaijan and intensified their policy in the region. Because of the pressure they faced under the Pahlavis, many Iranian Azeris supported the 1979 Islamic revolution in hopes of more cultural rights, such as the recognition of the Azerbaijani language, changing street names, and due to the commonality of their Shia faith. In the revolutionary phase, cultural rights movements arose in Kurdistan, Balochistan, and Azerbaijan. However, once the Islamic republic had consolidated its control over Iran, it firmly rejected increased rights. Many Iranian Azeris began to oppose the Islamic government as well, as it denied and continued to deny their request for language rights, as well as the drying of Lake Urmia, the marginalization of Azeris, among other factors. While the grievances of Azeris were similar, not all Azeris agreed on how to resolve them, as some were ethno-nationalists while others were religious. Unlike the Kurds, the Azeris did not revolt in the aftermath of the 1979 Islamic revolution. As tensions between Iranian Azeri activists and the Iranian government were increasing, the Iran-Iraq war broke out. Regional experts believed that if Saddam had not invaded Iran, it was very likely that the Azeris would have revolted. The Iran-Iraq war boosted nationalism in Iran and rallied the different ethnic groups in Iran against the Iraqi aggressors. Iranian nationalism was more effective than Shia Islam at mobilizing the Iranian society, leading the Iranian government to mix Shia and nationalist symbolism. The Iranian government used the rise of Iranian nationalism during the war to curb Azeri separatism. The Iranian government grew more concerned with Azeri separatism in Iran following Azerbaijani independence from the Soviet Union in 1991, although it calmed down after the Armenians captured Nagorno-Karabakh. However, when Azerbaijan captured it in 2020, the Iranian government again grew concerned and took measures against Azeri separatism in Iran.

In 1945, the Soviet Union helped establish the Azerbaijan People’s Government in Tabriz under Sayyid Ja’far Pishevari, a local Marxist and Azerbaijani nationalist. Although Azerbaijanis had always been highly integrated in the Iranian political, clerical, and military elite, there were many Azerbaijanis who wanted to secede from Iran. The early 20th century saw the rise of Turkic nationalist ideologies emanating from the CUP-led Ottoman Empire and later Kemalist Turkey, which began to influence intellectual circles in Tabriz and other Azerbaijani cities.

The Azerbaijan People's Government lasted for one year. With Soviet troops withdrawing in 1946, the Iranian army reasserted control, and the movement collapsed. Many of its leaders fled to the Soviet Union or were executed. Despite its short lifespan, the republic left a lasting symbolic legacy among modern Azerbaijani separatists in Iran.

Even after the 1953 coup, which intensified central control, Azerbaijanis continued to rise within the military and bureaucracy. The Iranian government suppression of Kurdish and Arab uprisings deterred similar movements in Iranian Azerbaijan. However, underground networks promoting pan-Turkism or Azerbaijani unification quietly persisted in Tabriz and other cities, often with support from Iranian Azerbaijani communities in Turkey and the Republic of Azerbaijan.

After the 1979 Islamic Revolution, many ethnic minorities expressed hope for cultural autonomy. However, the Islamic Republic maintained the centralized authority of the previous governments. The teaching of Azerbaijani in schools remained banned, and local attempts at decentralization were suppressed.

In the 1990s, Iranian Azerbaijani secular nationalists became the basis of Pan-Turkism and Pro-Turkey politics among Iranian Azerbaijanis. Along with the spread of Turkish media after the 2000s, nationalism also increased among Iranian Azerbaijanis, with various Iranian government attempts at countering it. Tractor S.C. acted as a base for Azerbaijani nationalism, as well as racism particularly towards Persians and Kurds. Tractor S.C. supporters regularly carried flags of the Republic of Azerbaijan and the flag of Turkey inside the stadium. In 1992, Azerbaijan elected Abulfaz Elchibey, whose pro-Turkish and anti-Iranian rhetorics alienated Iran. Turkish and Azerbaijani support of Azerbaijani separatism in Iran had been the source of tensions between Azerbaijan, Turkey and Iran. During the Nagorno-Karabakh war in 2020, Iran arrested several pro-Azerbaijan activists in Iranian cities, including some Turkish citizens. In December 2020, Erdoğan recited a controversial poem that sparked a diplomatic crisis with Iran. Iran boycotted Turkish products due to the poem.

Pan-Turkism became a dominant political current in Azerbaijan and Turkey. Pan-Turkist networks did maintain connections with Iranian Azerbaijani separatists, although they were often exaggerated by the Iranian government.

The Republic of Azerbaijan had generally avoided direct support for Azerbaijani separatism in Iran, although pan-Turkist NGOs and media based in Azerbaijan played a major role in spreading nationalist narratives.

In March 2025, Iran and Turkey both summoned ambassadors after Hakan Fidan accused Iran of supporting Kurdish militias, causing outrage in Iran. Many interpreted the Turkish statements as threats to support Azerbaijani separatists in Iran if Iran continued with the alleged support for Kurdish militias.

== See also ==
- Separatism in Iran
