= Efat Ghazi =

Kurdish Swedish refugee and murder victim (1935–1990)

- Born: 2 November 1935; Mahabad, Imperial State of Iran
- Died: 6 September 1990 (aged 54); Västerås, Sweden
- Cause of death: Letter bomb
- Citizenship: Sweden (habitual residence, but no citizenship)
- Education: Law
- Occupation: Teacher
- Known for: Refugee status, murder victim
- Spouse: Emir Ghazi
- Children: Two daughters
- Parents: Qazi Muhammad (father); Mina Eskandary (mother)

Efat Ghazi (Persian: عفت قاضی; 2 November 1935 – 6 September 1990) was a Kurdish refugee from Iranian Kurdistan who was killed by a letter bomb in Västerås, Sweden, in 1990.

== Life ==
Efat Ghazi was born in a Kurdish family in Iranian Kurdistan. Her father, Qazi Muhammad, was the president of the Republic of Mahabad, which was proclaimed in East Kurdistan in 1946 and existed briefly. After studying law in Iran, Ghazi worked as a teacher, a profession she continued in Sweden where she later arrived as a refugee. She gained habitual residence in 1985 but never had Swedish citizenship.

In Sweden, she reunited with her husband, Emir Ghazi, with whom she had two daughters. Emir Ghazi was a former member of the politburo of the Kurdistan Democratic Party of Iran (PDK-I) and later leader of the Independence Party of Kurdistan. Efat Ghazi was not politically active.

== Death ==
On 6 September 1990, at about 12:45 p.m., Ghazi was seriously wounded after opening a letter bomb outside her family's house in Västerås. She was taken to a hospital where she died from her wounds three hours later. From the letter remainders which the police collected from the crime scene, it was confirmed that the letter bomb was addressed to her husband.

The Iranian government was quickly suspected by many of having ordered the assassination, which had many similarities to other assassinations and assassination attempts of Iranian political exiles around the world at this time. However, a few years after the assassination, the Swedish police closed the investigation citing lack of evidence.

Thousands of people showed up at Ghazi's funeral in Västerås, many of them from abroad. Among the speakers at the funeral was C.-H. Hermansson, former leader of the Swedish Left Party.

== See also ==
- Kamran Hedayati
- Karim Mohammedzadeh
