= Rahim Sultanov =

Iranian-born Azerbaijani Iranologist

Rahim Sultanov (1912–2000) was an Iranian-born figure, who moved to Baku after the Soviet takeover of the Azerbaijan Democratic Republic. In the dawn of the Soviet occupation of Iran (see also: Iran crisis of 1946), Sultanov was ordered to join the pro-Soviet Azerbaijani-language newspaper Vatan/Veten yolunda ("On the Path of the Motherland") and the Soviet Persian-language newspaper Dust-e Iran ("Iran's Friend"). Sultanov was born in Ardabil and was an Iranian Azerbaijani. He was educated within Soviet institutions in Baku, translated the classics of Persian literature into Azerbaijani and contributed to the training of the "first generation of Soviet Azerbaijan-born Iranologists".
