= United Nations Security Council Resolution 2 =

United Nations Security Council resolution

UN Security Council Resolution 2
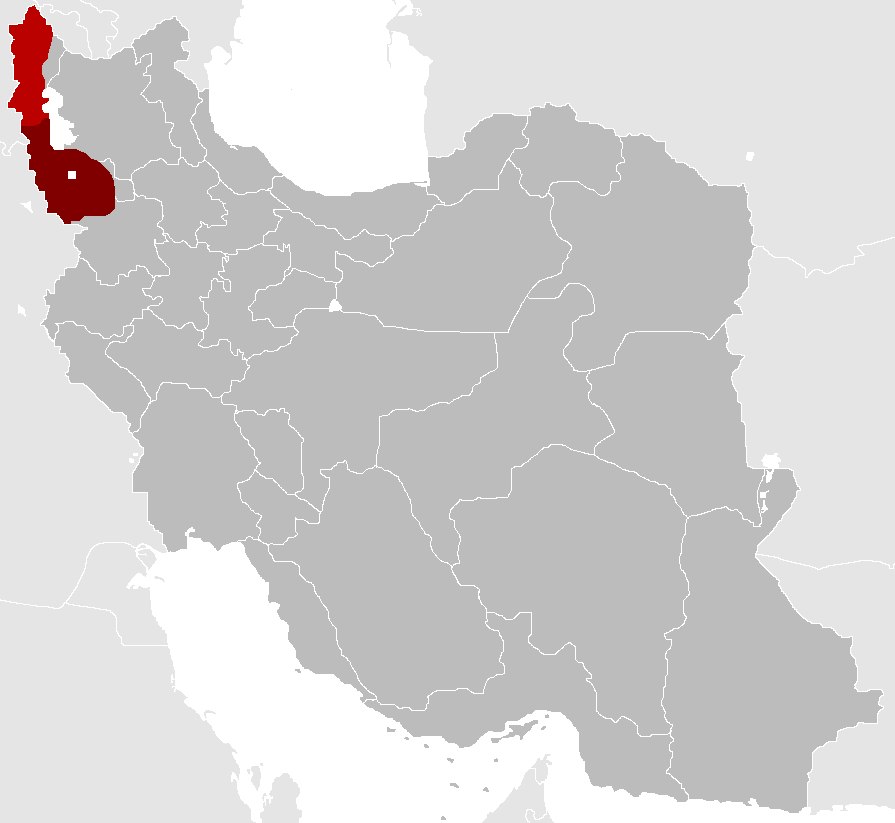
- Approximate extent of the Republic of Mahabad
- Date: 30 January 1946
- Meeting no.: 5
- Code: S/RES/2 (Document)
- Subject: Iran crisis of 1946
- Voting summary: 11 voted for; None voted against; None abstained
- Result: Adopted

Security Council composition
- Permanent members: China; France; Soviet Union; United Kingdom; United States
- Non-permanent members: Australia; Brazil; Egypt; Mexico; Netherlands; Poland

United Nations Security Council Resolution 2 was adopted unanimously on 30 January 1946. The Council urged Iran and the Soviet Union to resolve the crisis caused by the Soviet occupation of Iranian territory.

== Background ==
Soviet presence in Iran began in 1942 when Iran signed an agreement allowing British and Soviet troops to enter the country to defend its oil fields against a possible German attack. The treaty contained a specific provision that required all foreign troops to exit Iran within six months from the end of the war, but the Soviets remained past the withdrawal deadline.

Harry S. Truman's election signaled the beginning of a more hostile American foreign policy towards the Soviet Union. In line with this policy, the United States sent a telegram demanding the Soviet government to withdrawal from this territory and to uphold their agreement in the Tripartite Treaty.

== Aftermath ==
The immediate withdrawal of troops was pledged by the Soviet Union on 25 March 1946. In exchange for the withdrawal, Iran offered oil concessions to the Soviet government.

== See also ==
- Anglo-Soviet invasion of Iran
- Azerbaijan People's Government
- List of United Nations Security Council resolutions concerning Iran
- Republic of Mahabad
- United Nations Security Council Resolution 3
- United Nations Security Council Resolution 5
