= United Nations Security Council Resolution 5 =

United Nations Security Council resolution

UN Security Council Resolution 5
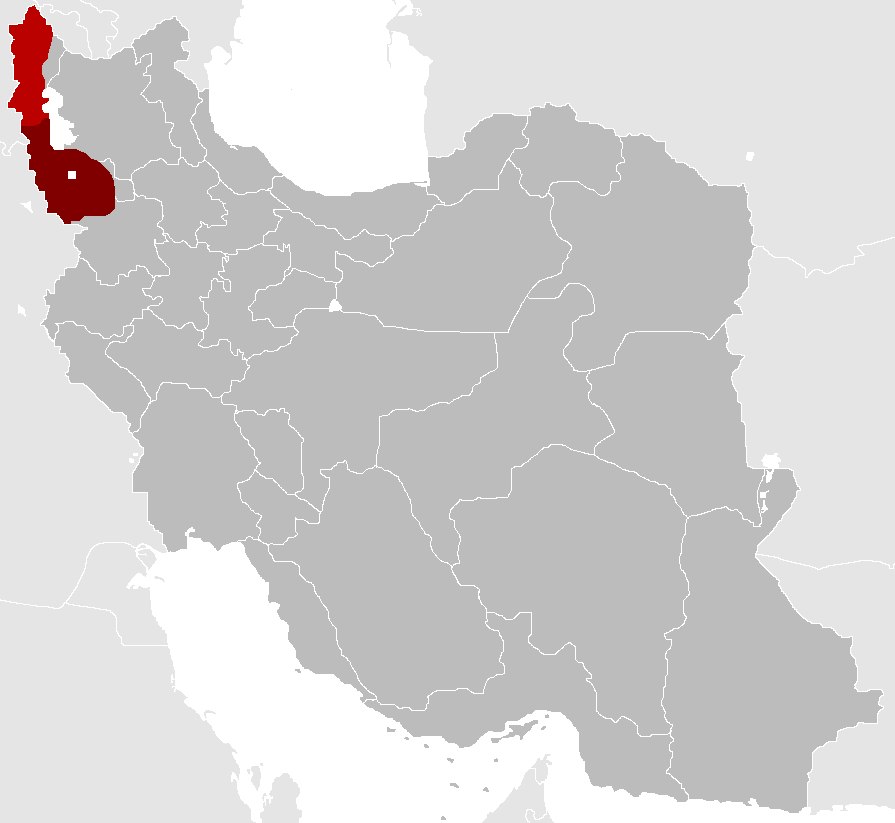
- Approximate extent of the Republic of Mahabad
- Date: May 8 1946
- Meeting no.: 40
- Code: S/RES/5 (Document)
- Subject: Iran crisis of 1946
- Voting summary: 10 voted for; None voted against; None abstained; 1 absent
- Result: Adopted

Security Council composition
- Permanent members: China; France; Soviet Union; United Kingdom; United States
- Non-permanent members: Australia; Brazil; Egypt; Mexico; Netherlands; Poland

United Nations Security Council Resolution 5 was adopted on 8 May 1946. The Council deferred further proceedings surrounding the Iranian crisis until Iran submitted a complete report on the subject.

Resolution 5 passed with ten votes to none. The Soviet Union was absent.

== See also ==
- Anglo-Soviet invasion of Iran
- Azerbaijan People's Government
- Republic of Mahabad
- United Nations Security Council Resolution 2
- United Nations Security Council Resolution 3
- List of United Nations Security Council resolutions concerning Iran
