= United Nations Security Council Resolution 3 =

United Nations Security Council resolution

UN Security Council Resolution 3
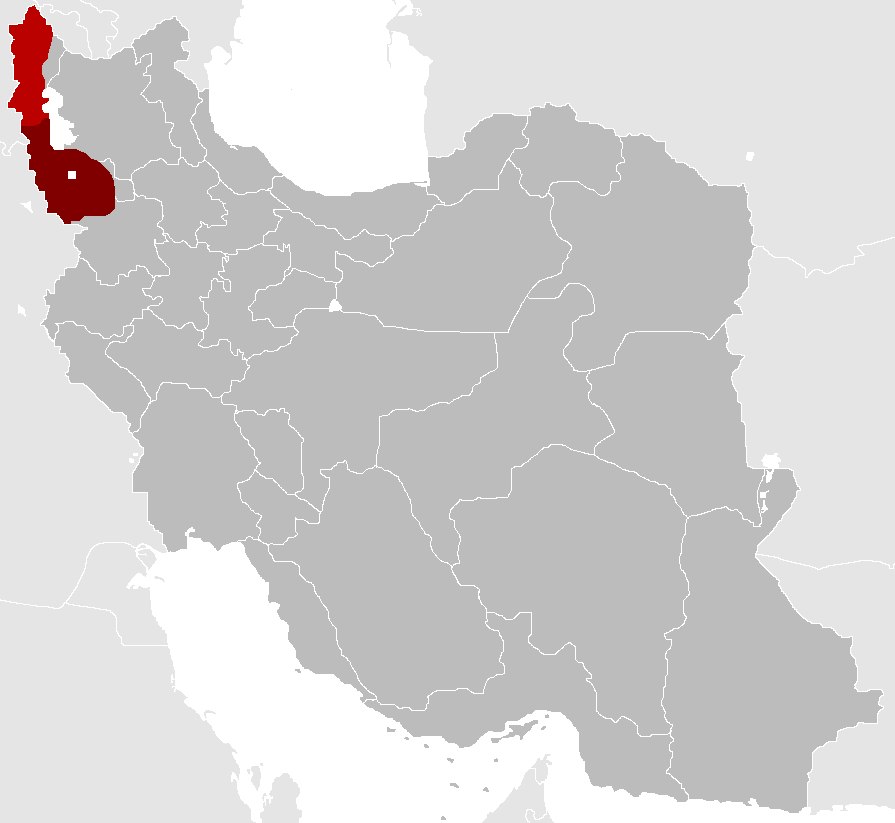
- Approximate extent of Soviet positions in the Republic of Mahabad.
- Date: April 4 1946
- Meeting no.: 30
- Code: S/RES/3 (Document)
- Subject: Iran crisis of 1946
- Voting summary: 9 voted for; None voted against; None abstained; 1 absent; 1 present not voting
- Result: Adopted

Security Council composition
- Permanent members: China; France; Soviet Union; United Kingdom; United States
- Non-permanent members: Australia; Brazil; Egypt; Mexico; Netherlands; Poland

United Nations Security Council Resolution 3 was adopted on 4 April 1946. The Council acknowledged that Soviet troops occupying Iran were not removed in accordance with the Tri-partite Treaty of 29 January. Further proceedings surrounding the Iranian crisis were deferred until 6 May, when Soviet withdrawal was to be complete.

The Council ordered that no member state should interfere with or prevent Soviet withdrawal from Iranian territory.

Resolution 3 passed with nine votes to none. Australia was present and not voting. The Soviet Union was absent.

== See also ==
- Anglo-Soviet invasion of Iran
- Azerbaijan People's Government
- Republic of Mahabad
- United Nations Security Council Resolution 2
- United Nations Security Council Resolution 5
