= Haji Baba Sheikh =

Former Prime minister of the Republic of Mahabad

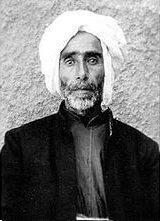
Haji Baba Sheikh

Haji Baba Sheikh (Kurdish: Hacî Baba Şêx – Bukan) was the Kurdish prime minister of the Republic of Mahabad. After the republic was conquered by the Imperial Iranian Army in 1947, unlike Qazi Muhammad, he was not executed. He was immune because of his religious standing. The journalist and lyric Hemin Mukriyani was his secretary during the republic.

== Biography ==
Haji Baba Sheikh was born in Mahabad in the late 19th century. He was a prominent and well respected tribal and religious leader in Mahabad. Qazi Muhammad appointed Haji Baba Sheikh as Prime Minister of the Republic of Mahabad. While Qazi Muhammad was executed in 1947, Haji Baba Sheikh was allowed to live, likely due to his respected status and lack of a major role in the establishment of the Republic of Mahabad. Haji Baba Sheikh later became a reminder for many Kurdish nationalists on how the Republic of Mahabad sought to integrate the Kurdish religious and tribal leadership into the modern political project.
