= Kamran Hedayati =

Assassinated Iranian Kurdish dissident (1949–1996)

Masoud Molavi Vardanjani
- Born: 1 April 1949; Hajji Kand, West Azerbaijan province, Imperial State of Iran
- Died: 4 July 1996 (aged 47); Stockholm, Sweden
- Cause of death: Assassination
- Citizenship: Iranian

Kamran Hedayati (Persian: کامران هدایتی, Kâmrân Hedâyati; 1 April 1949 – 6 July 1996) was an Iranian Kurdish dissident who was born in Iranian Kurdistan and was assassinated in Sweden in the 1990s.

In January 1994, Hedayati was seriously wounded after opening a letter bomb in his apartment in Bagarmossen, Stockholm, Sweden. He lost his hands and sight in the attack and died from his wounds two years later. The murder remains officially unsolved. However, the Iranian government is widely believed to have ordered the assassination, as it had many similarities with other assassinations and assassination attempts on eastern Kurdish dissidents around the world at this time. In 1990, a Kurdish refugee woman in Sweden named Efat Ghazi was killed in a similar attack through letter bombing in her apartment in Västerås.

== See also ==
- Efat Ghazi
- Karim Mohammedzadeh
