= Karim Mohammedzadeh =

Swedish Kurdish dissident (1963–1990)

- کریم محمدزاده
- Born: 1 July 1963; Qasemlu, West Azerbaijan province, Imperial State of Iran
- Died: 1 April 1990; Nynäshamn, Sweden
- Cause of death: Assassination
- Occupations: Dissident, Kurdish activist
- Known for: Iranian Kurdish dissident, assassination victim
- Movement: Kurdish independence movement

Karim Mohammedzadeh (Persian: کریم محمدزاده; 1 July 1963 – 1 April 1990) was an Iranian Kurdish dissident who was assassinated in Sweden in 1990.

== Life ==
Karim Mohammedzadeh was born in Iranian Kurdistan and came to Sweden as a political refugee in 1988 and immediately gained the right to asylum.

== Death ==
On 1 April 1990, he was assassinated in his apartment in the town of Nynäshamn south of Stockholm. The murder remains officially unsolved. However, the Iranian government is widely believed to have ordered the assassination as it had many similarities with other assassinations and assassination attempts on eastern Kurdish dissidents around the world at this time.

== Aftermath ==
In 2003, Sveriges Television showed a documentary film about the case by filmmaker Oscar Hedin. In the film, titled I nationens intresse ("In the Interest of the Nation"), an Iranian intelligence officer named Reza Taslimi was identified as the probable assassin. The Swedish Security Service (SÄPO) was severely criticised for having obstructed the criminal investigation carried out by the local Swedish police by withholding important information. For example, it was alleged that Taslimi had been identified by a taxi driver, who had driven him from Nynäshamn to Stockholm the day after the murder. However, this information was passed to the local police investigators three years after the assassination and by this time Taslimi had already left Sweden after having been arrested by SÄPO one year earlier on unspecified grounds and secretly deported back to Iran. Arne Nilsson, a retired police officer who was working on the case, said in the film: "It's terrible. One of the most vicious crimes has been committed and we didn't get the opportunity to hear a person of much interest for the investigation [...] When we see what they [SÄPO] have withhold from us, it feels very unsatisfactory".

== See also ==
- Efat Ghazi
- Kamran Hedayati
