= Qazi Muhammad =

Kurdish Islamic separatist leader (1893–1947)

- قازی محەممەد; Qazî Mihemed
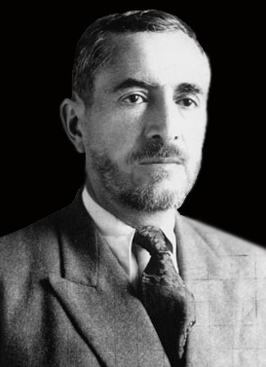

President of Republic of Mahabad
- In office 22 January 1946 – 15 December 1946
- Prime Minister: Haji Baba Sheikh
- Preceded by: Office created
- Succeeded by: Office abolished

Personal details
- Born: 1 May 1893 Mahabad, Sublime State of Iran
- Died: 31 March 1947 (aged 53) Mahabad, Imperial State of Iran
- Cause of death: Execution by hanging
- Citizenship: Iranian
- Party: PDKI
- Spouse: Mina Eskandary
- Children: 8
- Profession: Islamic judge at a Sharia court; Political leader

Qazi Muhammad (Kurdish: قازی محەممەد, romanized: Qazî Mihemed, Persian: قاضی محمد; 1 May 1893 – 31 March 1947) was an Iranian Kurdish Islamic cleric and political leader who founded the Democratic Party of Iranian Kurdistan (PDKI) and was the first president of the short-lived, Soviet-backed, though internationally unrecognized, secessionist Republic of Mahabad. He was hanged by the Iranian government for treason in 1947.

== Biography ==
Qazi Muhammad was born on May 1, 1893, into a prominent land-owning Sunni Kurdish family from Mahabad, and he was the son of Qazi Ali, a highly respected judge. His mother was from the Fayzullahbegi tribe, although he never claimed allegiance to it, and the family were described as "a quintessential example in the post-tribal order." He had one brother, Abdul Qasim Sadr-i Qazi, and three sisters. He received his primary education at a religious school (Kutubkhaneh) and received further education from his father. He spoke Kurdish, Persian, Turkish, Arabic, and a few Western languages. He married later in life and had a son and seven daughters. Qazi Muhammad served as the head of the Religious Endowment Department (Awqaf) of Mahabad before he succeeded his father as the Judge of Mahabad and was not only highly respected but also accepted as a nationalist leader. Before being involved in politics, he was already a leading citizen in Mahabad as a religious figure.

Mahabad had been effectively under Qazi Muhammad and his brother, Sadr-i Qazi, since the Soviet occupation of the city in 1941, although in 1942, Qazi Muhammad and several leaders from Mahabad mediated the return of Persian forces in Urmia. This allowed nationalist ideology to thrive in Mahabad, which gave way for the establishment the Society for the Revival of Kurdistan, founded in 1942 by 18 intellectuals and was overtly nationalist in its rhetoric and symbolism, although Qazi Muhammad never officially became a member, he nevertheless maintained close ties with its leaders. In October 1944, he was invited to join the group as its spiritual leader, but was never formally elected to the central committee. By 1945, the group reached out to the Soviets, who were uncomfortable with their nationalist orientation and unwillingness to establish ties with the Azerbaijani Democratic Party. Aiming to unite the Kurdish and Azeri groups, the Soviets invited a Kurdish delegation to Baku in September 1945 to meet with Mir Jafar Baghirov. The Kurdish delegation was headed by Qazi Muhammad and included Ali Rayhani and Saif Qazi. The Soviets also pressured them into closing the Society for the Revival of Kurdistan as the Kurdish movement grew too big for the group. Baghirov said that they needed a disciplined party with its own army to achieve independence and to transcend its parochialism so the Soviets would support them. Qazi Muhammad then established the Kurdistan Democratic Party in 1945. A year later, the Iraqi branch was established.

Qazi Muhammad was then joined by Mustafa Barzani along with thousands of his fighters who crossed into Iran on October 11, 1945. They were the backbone of the KDP. While Qazi had many disagreements with Barzani, he had to accept him due to his influence and numerous fighters. On December 17, the Kurdish flag was raised over the Ministry of Justice in Mahabad. Qazi Muhammad declared the formation of the Republic of Mahabad on January 22, 1946, stressing the religious and nationalist nature of the new administration. He was appointed president on February 11. The Republic of Mahabad had also established relations with the neighboring Azerbaijan People's Government.

Soviet forces had completed their withdrawal from Iran by May 9, 1946, leaving Ja'far Pishevari and Qazi Muhammad by themselves. By November 1946, the Iranian army began supporting local Kurds and Azeris against the two governments and also arranged for the defections of many Kurdish and Azeri fighters. The Army 4th Division led by General Homayuni became more aggressive against Qazi Muhammad after the Soviet withdrawal. Many Kurdish tribes had refused to fight against the Iranian army. The Mamash, Dehbokri and Mangur had always opposed Qazi Muhammad, and even the Shikak began distancing themselves from him, while the Barzanis were getting restive as they were no longer receiving free local provisions. Several Kurdish tribes, such as the Tilekuhis, actually supported the Iranian army against the KDP. The KDP negotiated a truce with Homayuni as the local Kurdish support for the Republic of Mahabad had progressively weakened and Qazi Muhammad only had around 1,000 tribal fighters by late 1946. The only tribes which Qazi counted on were the smaller tribes of Gawrik and Zerza.

Despite the efforts of the KDP and Soviets, "the [Kurdish] tribes almost all sided with the Iranian army." By mid-December, Qazi Muhammad sent his brother Sadr Qazi, a deputy in the National Consultative Assembly, to inform Homayuni on December 13, 1946 that the KDP would not resist the Iranian army. Homayuni asked that the Barzanis leave before his arrival. Qazi Muhammad warmly received the Iranian army after he heard of a planned offensive on Mahabad by government-backed Kurdish tribes, and the army peacefully entered the city on December 15, 1946. Qazi Muhammad, disheartened by the early surrender of the Azeris, went to Miandoab on December 16 to facilitate his own surrender, and Mahabad was handed to Iranian forces on December 17 without resistance. Qazi Muhammad was arrested just two days after the army arrived in Mahabad, where he and Hussein Saifi Qazi and Sadri Qazi were all judged by a military court-martial and charged with treason, instigating a revolt, and attempts to establish an autonomous government in Iran under the influence of a foreign power (the Soviet Union). They were hung at 5:00 a.m. on March 31, 1947.

His death made him a martyr among Kurdish nationalists. His grave also became a shrine for his supporters. The independence day of Mahabad, January 22, also became a celebration. His failures were explained by several factors, as the Kurds of Mahabad suffered severe economic hardships during his rule because they could not export tobacco to the rest of Iran, with food resources also becoming scarce by late 1946, and the few supplies having to be shared with the Barzanis. Furthermore, the Kurds of northwestern Iran had not forgotten the Russian atrocities committed there during World War I, and despite the Soviets keeping a low profile in Mahabad, the association of Qazi Muhammad with the Soviets was his greatest political liability, although it was later overshadowed by his status among Kurdish nationalists. The Kurdish nationalists in Mahabad, who had "nothing in common with the tribal chiefs", quickly gained support from non-tribal Kurds, although most Kurdish tribes ultimately sided with the government. The Iranian government condemned him as another separatist leader and accused the Qazi family of having Georgian origin.

== Family ==
One of his sons, Ali Qazi, was an active member in the Kurdish movement, he died in 2022 and was laid to rest in Kalar, Southern Kurdistan, close to the tomb of his sister Maryam and her husband Serdar Jaff, the famed lion of Kurdistan and his lifetime best friend. One of his daughters, Efat Ghazi, was killed by a letter bomb in Västerås, Sweden, in 1990. The bomb was addressed to her husband, the Kurdish activist Emir Ghazi. Some analysts speculated that the Iranian government might have been involved in the assassination.

== See also ==
- Timeline of Kurdish uprisings
- Abdul Rahman Ghassemlou
- Sadeq Sharafkandi
- Simko Shikak
