= Ahmad Kordary =

Azerbaijani politician

Ahmad Kordary served as Prime Minister of the short-lived unrecognized Azerbaijan People's Government from November 1945 to December 1946. The Chairman was Ja'far Pishevari.
