= Republic of Mahabad =

1946 unrecognised Kurdish state in Iran

Republic of Mahabad کۆماری کوردستان (Kurdish) جمهوری مهاباد (Persian)
- 1946
- Flag Coat of arms
- Anthem: ئەی ڕەقیب; Ey Reqîb "O Enemy!"
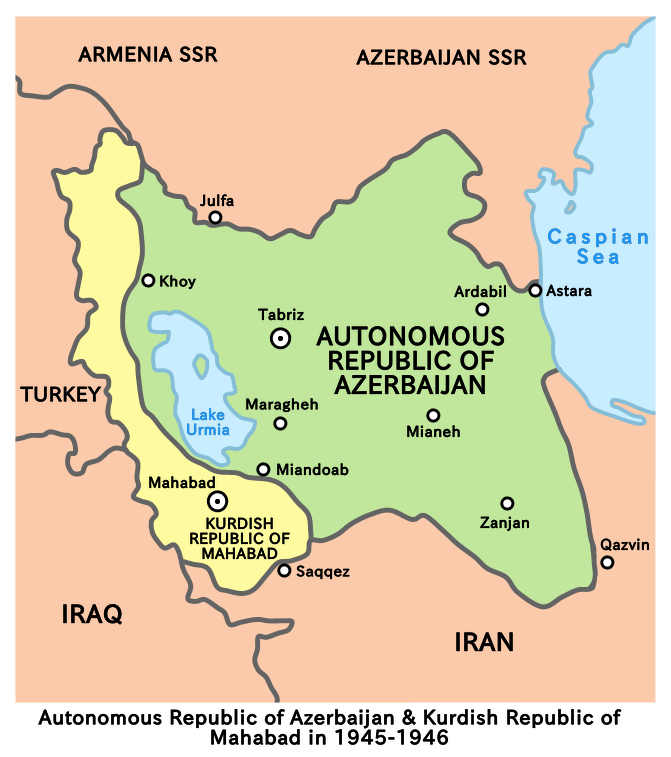
- The boundaries of the Republic of Mahabad
- Status: Unrecognized puppet state of the Soviet Union
- Capital: Mahabad
- Common languages: Kurdish
- Government: Socialist republic
- President
  - 1946: Qazi Muhammad (KDPI)
- Prime Minister
  - 1946: Haji Baba Sheikh (KDPI)
- Historical era: Cold War
  - Autonomy declared: 22 January 1946
  - Soviet withdrawal: June 1946
  - Iran reestablishes control: 15 December 1946
  - Leaders executed: 31 March 1947
- Currency: Soviet ruble
Preceded by	Succeeded by
Pahlavi Iran	Pahlavi Iran
- Today part of: Iran

The Republic of Mahabad, also referred to as the Republic of Kurdistan (Kurdish: کۆماری کوردستان, romanized: Komarî Kurdistan; Persian: جمهوری مهاباد, romanized: Jomhuriye Mahâbâd), was a short-lived Kurdish self-governing unrecognized state in present-day Iran, from 22 January to 15 December 1946. The Republic of Mahabad, sometimes described as a puppet state of the Soviet Union, arose in northwestern Iran alongside the Azerbaijan People's Government, a similarly short-lived and unrecognized Soviet puppet state.

The state encompassed a small territory, including Mahabad, the capital of the short-lived republic, and the adjacent cities of Bukan, Oshnavieh, Piranshahr and Naghadeh. The republic also claimed three cities—Urmia, Khoy and Salmas—held by the Azerbaijan People's Government.

== Background ==
Iran was invaded by the Allies in late August 1941, with the Soviets controlling the north. In the absence of a central government, the Soviets attempted to attach northwestern Iran to the Soviet Union, and promoted Kurdish nationalism. From these factors resulted a Kurdish manifesto that, above all, sought autonomy and self-government for the Kurdish people in Iran within the limits of the Iranian state. In the town of Mahabad, inhabited mostly by Kurds, a committee of middle-class people supported by tribal chiefs took over the local administration. A political party called the Society for the Revival of Kurdistan (Komeley Jiyanewey Kurdistan or JK) was formed. Qazi Muhammad, head of a family of religious jurists, was elected as chairman of the party. Although the republic was not declared until December 1945, Qazi's committee administered the area for more than five years until the republic's fall in 1946.

In 1946, the United Nations Security Council passed resolutions 2, 3 and 5, urging and eventually facilitating the removal of Soviet forces still occupying Iran.

== Foundation ==
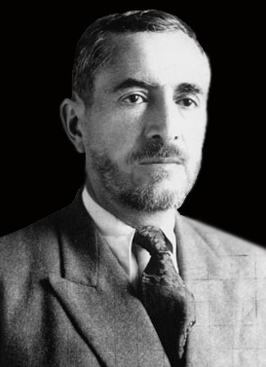
Qazi Muhammad

In the Iranian province of West Azerbaijan, the Soviet commander at Mīāndoāb summoned the Kurdish chieftains and transported them to Baku in Azerbaijan SSR. There, in late September, 1945, the Prime Minister of the Azerbaijan SSR told them that neither their own nationalist party, the Komala-ye Žīān-e Kordestān, nor the Tūda Party was looked on favorably, that they should seek their goals within Azerbaijani autonomy, and that they should call themselves the Democratic Party of Kurdistan. The Soviet Union's coercion tactics did not start the Azerbaijan movement entirely. Among other things, the Kurds opposed the government's detribalization efforts. So it made sense to both Kurds and Azeris in the years following the Soviet occupation in 1941 to be concerned with maintaining their sense of identity within their respective communal groups. On December 10, the Democratic Party took control of East Azerbaijan Province from Iranian government forces, forming the Azerbaijan People's Government. Qazi Muhammad decided to do likewise, and on December 15, the Kurdish People's Government was founded in Mahabad. On January 22, 1946, Qazi Muhammad announced the formation of the Republic of Mahabad. Some of the aims mentioned in the manifesto include:

- Autonomy for the Iranian Kurds within the Iranian state.
- The use of Kurdish as the medium of education and administration.
- The election of a provincial council for Kurdistan to supervise state and social matters.
- All state officials to be of local origin.
- Unity and fraternity with the Azerbaijani people.
- The establishment of a single law for both peasants and notables. [sic]

Qazi Muhammad had explicitly rejected independence and aimed for autonomy within the "Iranian empire".

== Military ==
=== Formation and command structure ===
The military force of the Republic of Mahabad, later known as the Peshmerga, grew out of the armed followers of Mustafa Barzani, who had led a tribal revolt against the Iraqi government in 1943–1945 before retreating across the border into Iranian Kurdistan with several thousand of his men following the Iraqi army's reoccupation of Barzan in October 1945. After Qazi Muhammad negotiated with Barzani for his support of the newly formed Democratic Party of Iranian Kurdistan, Barzani agreed to place himself and his fighters under the new administration in exchange for billeting and supplies, with around 3,000 of his followers stationed in and around Mahabad. The republic's government, proclaimed on 22 January 1946, included a Minister of War, Mohammad Hosein Khan Seif Qazi, who was nominally responsible for the new army, while operational command was distributed among several senior tribal and military figures—including Amar Khan Shikak, Hama Rashid, Khan Baney, Zero Beg Herki, and Mustafa Barzani, each of whom was given the rank of marshal and issued Soviet-style uniforms. A committee commissioned by Qazi Muhammad also standardized Kurdish military terminology during this period, including the term Peshmerga (Kurdish: پێشمەرگە, romanized: Pêşmerge) itself, meaning "one who faces death", to replace the Persian Serbaz.

=== Soviet assistance and training ===
The Kurdish forces were advised and organized by a Soviet officer, Captain Salahaddin Kazimov, and the Soviet Union sent at least 60 Kurdish officers to Soviet Azerbaijan for further military training. This assistance formed part of a broader Soviet effort to cultivate separatist movements in northern Iran, including the neighbouring Azerbaijan People's Government, as a means of pressuring Tehran during the wider Iran crisis of 1946. Soviet support for the Kurdish administration nonetheless remained limited and uneven, falling short of a permanent garrison or large-scale matériel commitment.

=== Organization ===
At its formal establishment, the Mahabad army consisted of approximately 70 officers, 40 non-commissioned officers, and 1,200 privates. By mid-May 1946, the total number of Kurdish forces in the field, drawing on tribal levies as well as Barzani's regulars, had grown to roughly 12,750, of whom about 1,800 formed dedicated infantry under Mustafa Barzani's direct command, with the remainder serving as cavalry. Barzani organized his own contingent into regiments under appointed commanders, including Major Bakr Abd al-Karim, Captain Mustafa Khoshnaw, and Captain Mir Haj Ahmad, many of whom had served with him since his earlier raids on Iraqi police posts in 1943. The relationship between this disciplined core and the wider tribal levies remained uneven: numerous smaller Kurdish tribes supplied auxiliary fighters whose readiness for combat was matched by a reputation for looting, and whose loyalty to Qazi Muhammad's government proved unreliable. Tribal disunity, rather than Iranian military strength alone, is considered to have been decisive in several engagements, as some tribal leaders withdrew their fighters from the field after accepting payments from Iranian or Soviet intermediaries.

Kurdish tribal forces facing south, mid-May 1946
No.	Tribe / faction	Commander(s)	Type	Strength
1	Barzanis	Mustafa Barzani	Infantry	1,200
2	Barzanis (not at the front)	Ahmed Barzani	Infantry	900
3	Shikaks	Amar Khan Shikak	Cavalry	800
4	Shikaks	Tahir Khan, son of Simko Shikak	Cavalry	500
5	Herkis and Begzadehs	Rashid Beg and Nuri Beg	Cavalry	1,000
6	Herkis	Zero Beg	Infantry	700
7	Jalalis and Milanis	—	Cavalry	400
8	Followers of Shaikh Abdullah Gilani's family	Sayyid Fahim	Cavalry	200
9	Zarza tribesmen	Musa Khan	Cavalry	300
10	Qarapapagh (Turkish tribe)	Pasha Khan and Khosravi Khan	Cavalry	500
11	Mamash	Kak. Abdullah Qaderi	Cavalry	400
12	Mamash	Kak. Hamza Nalos Amir al-Ashairi	Cavalry	500
13	Piran	Muhammad Amin Agha and Qarani Agha	Cavalry	300
14	Mangur	Abdullah Bayazidi	Cavalry	300
15	Mangur	Salim Agha Ojaq	Cavalry	200
16	Mangur	Ali Khan and Ibrahim Salari	Cavalry	400
17	Gewirks of Sardasht	Kak. Ala	Cavalry	200
18	Gewirks of Mahabad	Bayazid Aziz Agha	Cavalry	300
19	Gewirks of Saqqez	Ali Javanmardi, Mamand Agha, and Haji Ibrahim Agha	Cavalry	400
20	Miscellaneous Sardasht tribes	—	Cavalry	500
21	Suesni tribe	—	Cavalry	100
22	Dehbokris (Mahabad)	Jafar Karimi	Cavalry	400
23	Dehbokris (Bukan)	The Ilkhanizadeh Aghas	Cavalry	500
24	Faizullah Begis (Bukan and Saqqez)	—	Cavalry	800
25	Bedaghi family	—	Cavalry	200
26	Miscellaneous Mahabad and Shahin Dezh tribes	—	Cavalry	300
27	Followers of Hama Rashid Khan	—	Cavalry	300
28	Recruits from Javanrud and Hewraman	—	Cavalry	150
Total				12,750

This roster of tribal levies, drawn from across the republic's territory and beyond, is distinct from the regular Peshmerga regiments under Barzani's direct command; namely the First Kurdish Regiment, which fought at Qahrawa, and the Second Kurdish Regiment, which fought at Mamashah, both of which are counted within the Barzani entries above.

=== Military engagements ===
On 29 April 1946, the First Kurdish Regiment ambushed an advancing Iranian column of around 600 soldiers near Qahrawa, killing 21, wounding 17, and capturing 40 Iranian troops in what is regarded as the republic's first military success. A ceasefire negotiated on 3 May 1946 with Iranian general Ali Razmara temporarily curtailed further fighting and allowed both sides to reinforce their positions. This truce ended on 15 June 1946, when two Iranian battalions, supported by artillery, tanks, and aircraft, attacked positions held by the Second Kurdish Regiment at Mamashah. The defeat at Mamashah is generally treated as a turning point after which tribal support for the republic continued to erode, leaving Barzani's Peshmerga as effectively the sole.

=== Dissolution and aftermath ===
With Soviet forces withdrawn from northern Iran and promised reinforcements failing to materialize, the position of the Mahabad government became untenable by late 1946. Following negotiations to avoid civilian casualties, Barzani's forces withdrew from the capital toward Naqadeh on 15 December 1946, allowing Iranian troops to reoccupy Mahabad and bringing the republic's formal existence to an end.

Despite Iranian efforts to disarm them, the peshmerga succeeded in smuggling out a substantial quantity of weapons, including roughly 3,000 rifles, 120 machine guns, and two 75mm artillery pieces. Renewed fighting broke out in March 1947, during which Barzani's forces won several engagements, including the Battle of Nalos, where Kurdish artillery killed a number of Iranian soldiers, among them the Iranian regimental commander, Colonel Kalashi, and took further prisoners, and a separate ambush in which an Iranian column lost some 50 soldiers and an officer, Lieutenant Jahanbani, son of General Amanullah Jahanbani, was captured.

Facing continued Iranian pressure and the arrest of several officers who had attempted to return to Iraq, Barzani led a fighting retreat with his remaining Peshmerga toward the Soviet border, engaging Iranian forces along the way before crossing the Aras River into the Soviet Union with more than 500 fighters and their families on 18 June 1947, bringing the organized military history of the Mahabad Republic to a close.

== Education ==
Education was aimed to be provided for free and in Kurdish language. But at the beginning of the republic, the teachers had to translate from the textbooks in Persian language to the Kurdish language. Only at the end of the existence of the republic, textbooks in the Kurdish language were to be distributed to the schools. On the same day, the formation of high school for girls was also announced.

== Relationship to the Soviets ==
The Republic of Mahabad depended on Soviet support. Archibald Bulloch Roosevelt, Jr., grandson of the former U.S. President Theodore Roosevelt, wrote in 1947 in "The Kurdish Republic of Mahabad" that a major problem of the People's Republic of Mahabad was that the Kurds needed the assistance of the USSR; only with the Red Army did they have a chance. However, the Republic's close relationship with the USSR alienated it from most Western powers, causing them to side with Iran's central government. Qazi Muhammad did not deny that the Soviets funded and supplied his republic, but denied that the Democratic Party of Iranian Kurdistan (KDPI) was a communist party. He portrayed this notion as a lie fabricated by the Iranian military authorities, and added that his ideals differed greatly from those of the Soviets.

Contemporaries – both friends and foes – tended to exaggerate the Soviet role in the Republic of Mahabad. While Kurdish nationalist leaders Abdul Rahman Ghassemlou and Jalal Talabani stressed Soviet friendship and support, others like Robert Rossow, Jr., the American chargé d'affaires in neighboring Azerbaijan, and historian William Linn Westermann branded the republic a Soviet puppet state. This notion was also widespread amongst Kurdish tribal leaders, many of whom disagreed with Qazi's leadership.

The Soviets were however generally ambivalent towards the Kurdish administration. They did not maintain a garrison near Mahabad and also did not have any civil agent of sufficient standing to exercise any great influence. They encouraged Qazi's administration by practical benevolent operations such as providing motor transport, keeping out the Iranian army, and buying the whole of the tobacco crop. On the other hand, the Soviets initially did not like the Kurdish administration's refusal to be absorbed into the larger Democratic Republic of (Persian) Azerbaijan, and discouraged the formation of an independent Kurdish state. Following the fall of Mahabad, they however allowed for the safe passage of Mustafa Barzani and his followers into the Soviet Union.

== End ==
On 26 March 1946, due to pressure from Western powers including the United States, the Soviets promised the Iranian government that they would pull out of northwestern Iran. In June, Iran reasserted its control over Iranian Azerbaijan. This move isolated the Republic of Mahabad, eventually leading to its destruction.

Qazi Muhammad's internal support eventually declined, especially among the Kurdish tribes who had supported him initially. Their crops and supplies were dwindling, and their way of life was becoming hard as a result of the isolation. Economic aid and military assistance from the Soviet Union was gone, and the tribes saw no reason to support him. The townspeople and the tribes had a large divide between them, and their alliance for Mahabad was crumbling. The tribes and their leaders had only supported Qazi Muhammad for his economic and military aid from the Soviet Union. Once that was gone, many did not see any reason to support him. Other tribes resented the Barzanis, since they did not like sharing their already dwindling resources with them. Some Kurds deserted Mahabad, including one of Mahabad's own marshals, Amir Khan. Mahabad was economically bankrupt, and it would have been nearly impossible for Mahabad to have been economically sound without harmony with Iran.

Those who stayed began to resent the Barzani Kurds, as they had to share their resources with them.

On 5 December 1946, the war council told Qazi Muhammad that they would fight and resist the Iranian army if they tried to enter the region. The lack of Kurdish tribal support however made Qazi Muhammad only see a massacre upon the Kurdish civilians performed by the Iranian army rather than Kurdish rebellion. This forced him to avoid war at all cost.

Ten days later, on 15 December 1946, Iranian forces entered and secured Mahabad. Once there, they closed down the Kurdish printing press, banned the teaching of Kurdish language, and burned all Kurdish books that they could find. Finally, on 31 March 1947, Qazi Muhammad was hanged in Mahabad on counts of treason. At the behest of Archie Roosevelt, Jr., who argued that Qazi had been forced to work with the Soviets out of expediency, U.S. ambassador to Iran George V. Allen urged the Shah not to execute Qazi or his brother, only to be reassured: "Are you afraid I'm going to have them shot? If so, you can rest your mind. I am not." Roosevelt later recounted that the order to have the Qazis killed was likely issued "as soon as our ambassador had closed the door behind him," adding with regard to the Shah: "I never was one of his admirers."

== Aftermath ==
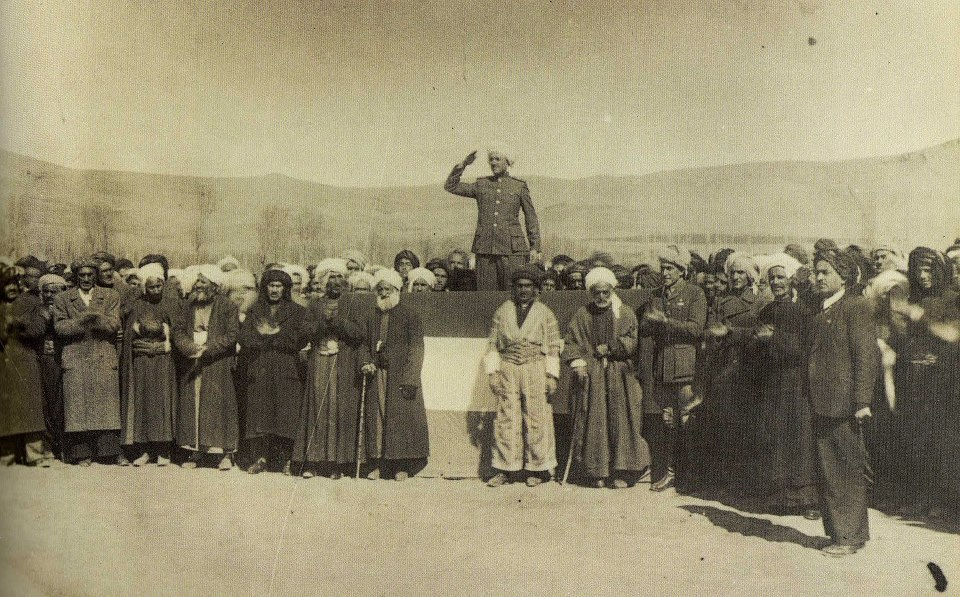
Qazi Muhammed establishing the Republic of Mahabad

Mustafa Barzani, with his soldiers from Iraqi Kurdistan, had formed the backbone of the Republic's forces. After the fall of the republic, most of the soldiers and four officers from the Iraqi army decided to return to Iraq. The officers were condemned to death upon returning to Iraq and are today honored along with Qazi as heroes martyred for Kurdistan. Several hundred of the soldiers chose to stay with Barzani. They defeated all efforts of the Iranian army to intercept them in a five-week march and made their way to Soviet Azerbaijan. From 1946, Barzani lived in the Soviet Union, and the Shah remained "eternally suspicious" of him. He returned to Iraq when Abdul-Karim Qasim came to power and his relationship with the government changed several times.

== See also ==
- Mukriyan
- Kurds in Iran
- Azerbaijan People's Government
- Persian Socialist Soviet Republic
- Autonomous Government of Khorasan
- Iran–Russia relations
- Iran crisis of 1946

== Bibliography ==
- "The Republic of Kurdistan: Fifty Years Later", International Journal of Kurdish Studies, 11, no. 1 & 2, (1997).
- The Kurdish Republic of 1946, William Eagleton, Jr. (London: Oxford University Press, 1963)
- (in German) Moradi Golmorad: "Ein Jahr autonome Regierung in Kurdistan, die Mahabad-Republik 1946–1947" in: Geschichte der kurdischen Aufstandsbewegungen von der arabisch-islamischen Invasion bis zur Mahabad-Republik, Bremen 1992, ISBN 3-929089-00-9
- (in French) M. Khoubrouy-Pak: Une république éphémère au Kurdistan, Paris u.a. 2002, ISBN 2-7475-2803-0
- Archie Roosevelt, Jr., "The Kurdish Republic of Mahabad", Middle East Journal, no. 1 (July 1947), pp. 247–269.
- William Linn Westermann, "Kurdish Independence and Russian Expansion", Foreign Affairs, Vol. 24, 1945–1946, pp. 675–686
- Kurdish Republic of Mahabad, Encyclopedia of the Orient.
- "The Kurds: People without a country", Encyclopædia Britannica
- Voller, Yaniv (2014). The Kurdish Liberation Movement in Iraq: From Insurgency to Statehood. Routledge. pp. 45–47. ISBN 978-0-415-70724-4.
- Yassin, Burhaneddin A., "A History of the Republic of Kurdistan", The International Journal of Kurdish Studies, 11, nos. 1–2 (1997): 115–240.
- Yassin, Burhaneddin A., Vision or Reality: The Kurds in the Policy of the Great Powers, 1941–1947, Lund University Press, Lund/Sweden, 1995. ISSN 0519-9700, ISBN 91-7966-315-X Lund University Press. ou ISBN 0-86238-389-7 Chartwell-Bratt Ltd.
- (in Russian) Масуд Барзани. Мустафа Барзани и курдское освободительное движение. Пер. А. Ш. Хаурами, СПб, Наука, 2005.
- (in Russian) М. С. Лазарев. Курдистан и курдский вопрос (1923–1945). М., Издательская фирма «Восточная литература» РАН, 2005.
- (in Russian) Жигалина О. И. Национальное движение курдов в Иране (1918–1947). М., «Наука», 1988.
- (in Russian) История Курдистана. Под ред. М. С. Лазарева, Ш. Х. Мгои. М., 1999.
- (in Russian) Муртаза Зарбахт. От Иракского Курдистана до другого берега реки Аракс. Пер. с курдск. А. Ш. Хаурами. М.-СПб, 2003.
- Eagleton, William (1963). The Kurdish Republic of 1946. London: Oxford University Press.
- Hasanli, Jamil (2006). At the Dawn of the Cold War: The Soviet–American Crisis over Iranian Azerbaijan, 1941–1946. Lanham, MD: Rowman & Littlefield.
- Lortz, Michael G. (2005). Willing to Face Death: A History of Kurdish Military Forces – the Peshmerga – from the Ottoman Empire to Present-Day Iraq (PDF) (MA thesis). Florida State University.
- McDowall, David (2004). A Modern History of the Kurds (3rd ed.). London: I.B. Tauris.
- Roosevelt, Archie (1947). "The Kurdish Republic of Mahabad". Middle East Journal. 1 (3): 247–269.
