= Kak (title) =

Kurdish honorific title

Kak (Kurdish: کاک) (Note: Other forms: کاکا (Kaka), کەکە (Keke), کاکۆ (Kako), کەک (Kek), کاکم (Kakim), or کاکە (Kake)) (Note: In colloquial speech, kak is sometimes shortened to Ka by speakers.) is a traditional honorific title in Kurdish society, commonly used to address or refer to men with respect. The term literally translates to "elder brother", "brother", or mister and is often used to convey familiarity, respect, or social status. It can also be used to refer to an "uncle".

Several prominent leaders of Kurdish movements in both Iraqi Kurdistan and Iranian Kurdistan have been known by the title kak. Notable examples include Masoud Barzani, Nawshirwan Mustafa and Foad Mostafa Soltani. Within the Kurdish Peshmerga forces, the title kak is commonly used to address any Peshmerga fighter, regardless of rank.

== Etymology ==
The word kak is of Iranian origin and is etymologically related to similar forms in other Indo-Iranian languages. It is also thought to descend from the ancient Median language. The Kurdish "kâk(a)" corresponded to the Luri and Persian "kâkâ", but not exactly to the Mazandarani "gaga". During the Median period, it was used for important or noble individuals, including historical figures such as Kuaxarēs. More generally, the term reflects a Kurdish system of religious and social hierarchy, analogous to titles such as Sheikh, Khawaja, or Mawla in neighboring regions. In Romani, for example, the word káko means "uncle" and is considered a Kurdish loanword, likely derived from Kurdish kak, which carries the same meaning.

The term is also related to the Kakais, (also spelled Kakeyi) a religious group in Kurdistan Region, which derives from the kak, and literally translates to "belonging to the brotherhood", as well as the tribe of Kakavand.

== Usage ==
As a title, kak functions similarly to other Kurdish honorifics and does not accept grammatical affixes when used in this way. In Kurdish language, titles can appear in two positions relative to a proper name:

1. Immediately before the name, (like kak) e.g.: Mr. or Şêx (Sheikh).
2. Immediately after the name, e.g.: Xanim (Ms.).
