= Barzanji =

Barzanji (transliteration from Iranian برزنجي) or Berzenci (Turkish spelling) may refer to:

- Barzanji Kurds, a Kurdish clan
- Mahmud Barzanji (1878–1956), Kurdish leader during the Mahmud Barzanji revolts
- Baba Ali Shaikh Mahmood (1912–1996), Kurdish Iraqi politician
- Jalal Barzanji (born 1953), Kurdish writer, poet, and activist
- Al-Barzanjī (1716–1764), Shafi'i mufti of Medina
- Kamal Barzanji, Iraqi Air Force commander

== See also ==
- Barzan (disambiguation)
- Barzani (disambiguation)
