= Kurdish state =

Kurdish state may refer to:

- The Kurdish state (1918–1919), a historical polity in southern Kurdistan.
- A hypothetical state spanning all of Kurdistan. See Kurdish nationalism and Kurdistan.
- List of Kurdish dynasties and countries
