= Jaliyat al-Kadr =

Supplicatory poem

Removal of Distress
- Author: Ja’far Al-Barzanjī
- Original title: Jāliyat al-Kadr (Arabic: جالية الكدر)
- Translator: Abdul Aziz Ahmed
- Language: Arabic
- Subject: Intercession and Supplication
- Publisher: Manaqib Press
- Publication date: 18th century
- Publication place: Hejaz
- English publication date: 1 July 2015
- Pages: 128
- ISBN: 978-0-9563109-1-0

Jāliyat al-Kadr (Arabic: جالية الكدر, English: Removal of Distress) is a supplicatory poem in which God is implored through the Islamic prophet Muhammad and his companions who fought alongside him in the Battles of Badr and Uhud. It was written by Ja’far b. Ḥasan b. ‘Abd al-Karīm b. al-Sayyid Muḥammad b. ‘Abd al-Rasūl al-Barzanjī, the Shafi'i Mufti of Medina and author of the Mawlid al-Barzanjī. The Jāliyat al-Kadr was written in the 18th century when the Ottoman empire was in decline and the Muslim world was in a state of political and intellectual upheaval. It is an example of a Sunni devotional work on intercession.

== Structure ==
The Jāliyat al-Kadr has four sections:

1. Muqaddimah (Opening)
2. Asmā’ Ahl al-Badr (Names of the People of Badr)
3. Asmaā’ Shuhadā’ Uhud (Names of the Martyrs of Uhud)
4. Khatimah (Closing)

== Commentary ==
A known commentary of Jāliyat al-Kadr is al-ʿArā’is al-Wāḍiḥa al-Gharar fī Sharḥ al-Manẓūma al-Badriyya by ‘Abdul Hādi Najā al-Abyārī (d. 1888).

== Annotation ==
Al-Sayyid Muhammad Alawi al-Maliki (d. 2004) annotated and released an edition of the Jāliyat al-Kadr in the 80s.

== Translation ==
In 2015, Manaqib Press published the first English translation of Jāliyat al-Kadr. It was translated by Abdul Aziz Ahmed and redacted by Amjad Mahmood.

== Popular Devotion ==
Traditionally, Jāliyat al-Kadr is recited on the 17th of Ramadan, at the completion of the Qur'an and at general gatherings of remembrance. In Dar al-Mustafa, it is recited at `Aṣr on the 17th of Ramadan.

== See also ==
- Al-Barzanjī
- Mawlid al-Barzanjī
