= Barda Qaraman =

Town in the Kurdistan Region, Iraq

Barda Qaraman بەردە قارەمان
- Town
- Interactive map of Barda Qaraman
- Location in Iraq Barda Qaraman (Iraqi Kurdistan)
- Coordinates: 35°38′54″N 45°4′0″E
- Country: Iraq
- Region: Kurdistan Region
- Governorate: Sulaymaniyah
- District: Sulaymaniyah
- Subdistrict: Barda Qaraman
- Time zone: UTC+3 (AST)

Barda Qaraman (Kurdish: بەردە قارەمان, romanized: Berde Qareman, lit. 'Rock of the Hero'), also spelled Bardaqaraman, is a town and subdistrict in the Sulaymaniyah Governorate of the Kurdistan Region in Iraq. The town is approximately 35 kilometers west of Sulaymaniyah. The name of the town means "Rock of the Hero" in Kurdish, referring to a large boulder Sheikh Mahmud and his forces used. Under the Ba’athist regime of Saddam Hussein, the town was created and given a derogatory name meaning "eggplant" to insult and belittle the Kurds. After the 2003 Iraq invasion, the KRG renamed the town to Barda Qaraman. The town today has also been converted into a center for tourism.

== History ==
The Ba'athist Iraq state pursued a policy of Arabization in Kurdish regions to aid in the erasure of the Kurdish people's history and culture. Barda Qaraman was originally one of several encampments of displaced Kurdish people established by the Ba’athist regime in the 1970s and 1980s that developed into towns. At the time of its establishment by the Ba'athist regime, it was given a derogatory name meaning "eggplant" by the Saddam Hussein regime; the name was intended to "insult, belittle, and mock [the] Kurdish people".

After the 2003 invasion of Iraq, the Kurdistan Regional Government (KRG) moved to reverse Arabization policies, and the town was officially renamed to Barda Qaraman in honor of the Kurdish fighters in the 1919 rebellion. The name Barda Qaraman means "Rock of the Hero" in English. The name refers to a large boulder near the Bazyan Pass where Sheikh Mahmud and the Kurdish fighters made their stand against the British Army in 1919. After the renaming, the KRG developed Barda Qaraman into a tourist destination, constructing a large park and a monument depicting the actions of Sheikh Mahmud’s army. Local residents and tourists visit the site to learn about Kurdish history.

In October 2025, Nechirvan Barzani, the president of the Kurdistan Region, issued a decree officially establishing Barda Qaraman as a sub-district within the Sulaymaniyah Governorate.

== See also ==
- Kurdistan Region
- Sulaymaniyah Governorate
- Kurdistan Regional Government
- Sheikh Mahmud Barzanji
- Mahmud Barzanji revolts
