= Baba Ali Shaikh Mahmood =

Kurdish politician (1912–1996)

Sheikh Baba Ali Shaikh Mahmood
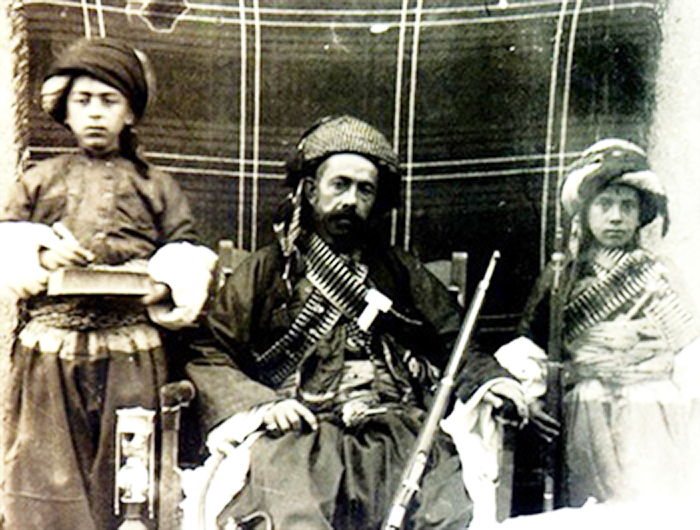
- Sheikh Mahmud Barzanji with his son
- Born: 1912; Sulaymaniyah, Mosul Vilayet, Ottoman Iraq, Ottoman Empire
- Died: 1996 (aged 84); London, Great Britain
- Family: Barzanji

Baba Ali Shaikh Mahmood (1912, in Sulaymaniyah – 1996, in London) was an Iraqi-Kurdish politician. He served as minister of finance from 1946 to 1947, minister of transport from 1958 to 1959, and minister of agriculture from February to August 1963.

== See also ==
- Mahmud Barzanji
- Mahmud Barzanji revolts
