= Flag of Kurdistan =

Kurdistan
- Alaya Rengîn (lit. 'The Colourful Flag')
- Proportion: 2:3
- Adopted: c. 1927 by Republic of Ararat; 1992 by Kurdistan Region
- Design: A red, white, and green tricolour, with a yellow 21 rayed sun in the center (Kurdish Sun).

The flag of Kurdistan (Kurdish: ئاڵای کوردستان, Alaya Kurdistanê), also called Ala Rengin, is the flag of Kurds and was created by the Society for the Rise of Kurdistan in 1920. It would later be adopted as the national flag of different Kurdish states including Republic of Ararat, Republic of Mahabad, and most recently by Kurdistan Region in 1992. (Note: In different variants.) Moreover, the Kingdom of Kurdistan used a crescent flag (shown below) which was also considered a Kurdish flag.

== History ==
=== Simko's flag ===
Flag of the Simko Shikak revolt.

During the Simko Shikak revolts (1918–1922), this flag was utilized by his forces, as documented in his contemporary newspaper, Kurd. The banner featured a Quranic verse inscribed across the top, while the central text read "کردستان سربخوە" (lit. 'Independent Kurdistan').

=== Union Jack ===
In October 1918, near the end of World War I, Mahmud Barzanji broke away from the Ottoman Empire and established the Kurdish state. As it was initially subordinate to Britain, the polity flew the British Union Jack until it revolted in May 1919.

=== Crescent flag ===
Second flag of the Kurdish state (during the 1919 anti-British revolt), also the flag of the Kingdom of Kurdistan (1921–1925).

In May 1919, the Kurdish State revolted against the British Empire, and adopted a crescent flag. The British Empire conquered the Kurdish state in June 1919.

After the establishment of the Kingdom of Kurdistan in 1921, the crescent flag was again hoisted in Sulaymaniyah by Mahmud Barzanji. According to historian Rafiq Hilmi, the Kingdom of Kurdistan considered the crescent flag as the national flag of Kurds. He wrote: "A big meeting was held at the house of Şêx Qadir, the Speaker of the National Assembly, and with official permission, the official Kurdish flag was raised. On the day of the meeting, about 10,000 people gathered in front of the Grand Mosque."

=== CTK flag ===
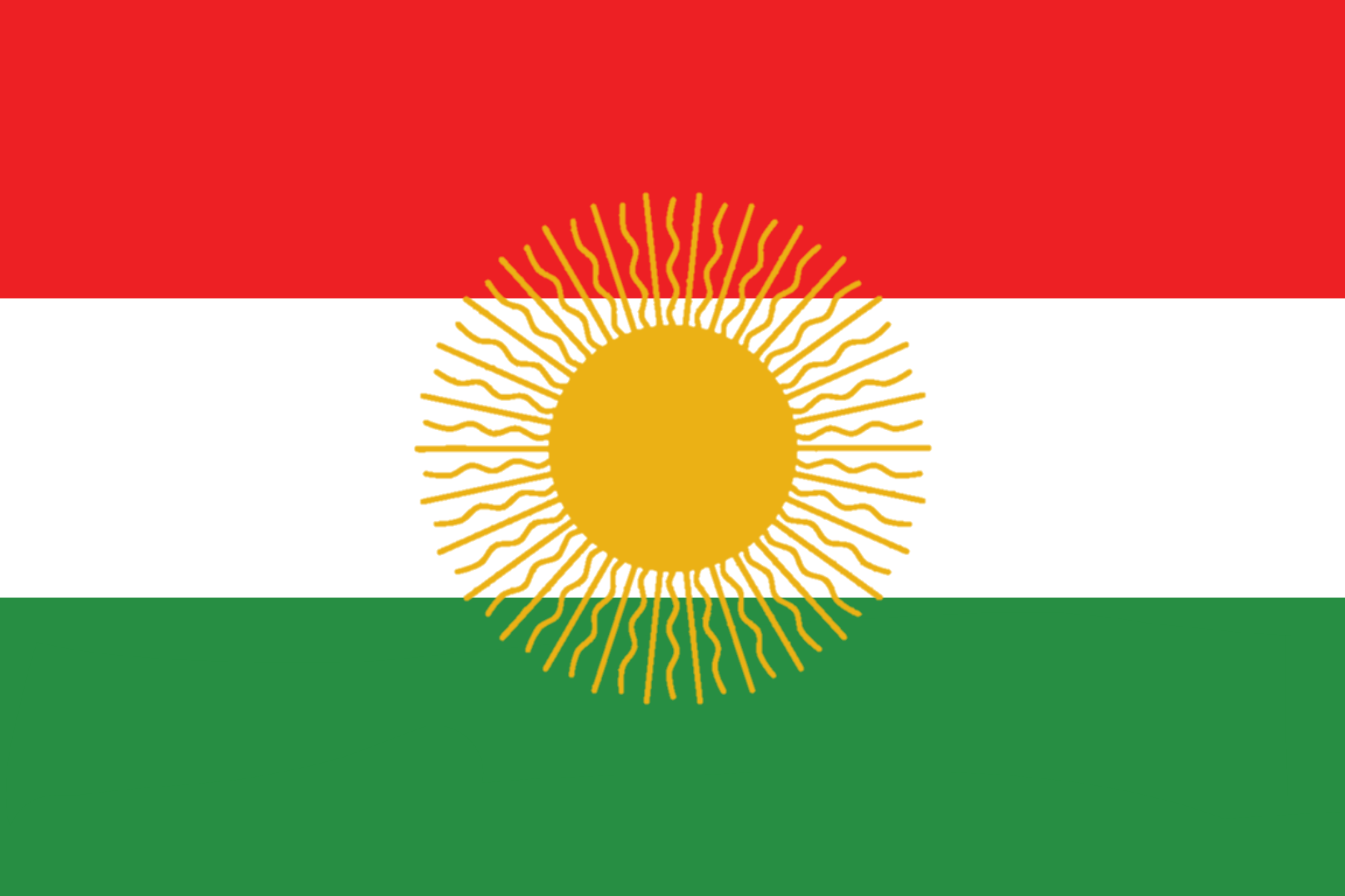
Flag of the Republic of Ararat (1927–1930) adopted by Xoybûn.

This flag was created in 1920 by the Society for the Rise of Kurdistan (CTK). Shortly after, it was used by the nationalist party Xoybûn who hoisted the flag over the city of Ağrı during the Ararat rebellion. In his memoir Doza Kurdistan, Kurdish politician Kadri Cemilpaşa of the CTK declared that this flag was the national Kurdish flag whose colors and shape had now been defined. In 1925, during the trial of CTK politicians in Turkey, they stated that the Ottoman flag was dead and that the Kurdish flag would shine like a sun.

=== Republic of Mahabad (1940s) ===
Flag of the Republic of Mahabad

Along with the Soviet-style flag, the Mahabad Republic also used the traditional Kurdish sunburst flag based on the flag sewn by Fatima Assad Shahin, held by founder Qazi Muhammad during the declaration of the republic on 22 January 1946.

Before the declaration of the Republic of Mahabad from Iran in 1946, Kurdish leaders in Iran from Democratic Party of Iranian Kurdistan (KDPI) with support from Kurds in Iraq, had prepared the flag to be used as the national flag of the Mahabad Republic. The prepared flag was altered and approved by the KDPI who went on to hoist it in the official office of the Iranian government in Mahabad on 17 December 1945. When the republic was declared on 22 January 1946, the flag was hoisted at the main square while Ey Reqîb was being sung. In his speech, President Qazi Muhammad declared the flag as "flag of Kurdistan" and it was hoisted in all towns which was under his control. Days before the collapse of the republic, President Muhammad handed over the flag on his desk to Mustafa Barzani, leader of Kurdistan Democratic Party, who had fled to Mahabad after the 1943 Barzani revolt.

== Symbolism ==
The Kurdish flag is the most important symbol of cohesive Kurdish identity. Since it was first hoisted in 1946 to represent the concept of an independent Kurdistan (called the Republic of Mahabad and founded in Iranian territory) it has become a symbol of the national identity of Kurds.

The main characteristic of the flag is the blazing golden sun emblem (Roj in Kurdish) at its center. The emblem's sun disk has 21 rays, equal in size and shape, with the single odd ray at top and the two even rays on the bottom.

The symbolism of the colours is:

Colour	Meaning
Red RGB: (235,35,35) HEX: #ED2024	Symbolizes the blood of the martyrs and the continued struggle for freedom and dignity.
Green RGB: (39,138,65) HEX: #278E43	Expresses the beauty and landscapes of Kurdistan. Life and vitality.
Yellow RGB: (250,185,20) HEX: #FEBD11	Represents the source of life and light of the people. The sun is an ancient symbol and the number of its rays, 21, which holds religious and cultural importance in Yazidism, Yarsanism and Alevism, symbolizes the rebirth of the Kurdish nation, identity, and dignity.
White RGB: (255,255,255) HEX: #FFFFFF	Represents peace and equality.

In the fall of 2006, the Iraqi Kurdish leadership gave orders for Kurdish officials to stop flying the Iraqi flag under decree number 60 "to hoist the flag of Iraqi Kurdistan". Masoud Barzani issued orders that the Ba'athist flag should be lowered and all regions in Iraqi Kurdistan should "hoist only the Kurdistan flag" because the symbols of Ba'athism were associated with the Anfal genocide where 180,000 people died. When the Ba'athist symbols were removed from the Iraqi flag in 2008, the KRG hoisted the Iraqi flag to fly alongside the Kurdish flag, reported to still be the practice as of March 2013. Flying the Iraqi flag side by side with the Kurdish flag is symbolic of their acceptance of Iraqi federalism.

== Modern adaptation to international flag standards ==
The flag appeared in Kurdish media throughout the 1990s with MED TV, Kurdsat, Kurdistan TV and their affiliates broadcasting with the flag appearing frequently in their programming allowing it to become a symbol of Kurdish statehood.

== Other flags used by Kurds ==
The tricolor flag of TEV-DEM, adopted c. 2012 for the Democratic Autonomous Administration of North and East Syria

== Kurdistan Region's flag day ==
Since 1993, the Kurdish Flag Day is celebrated on 17 December.

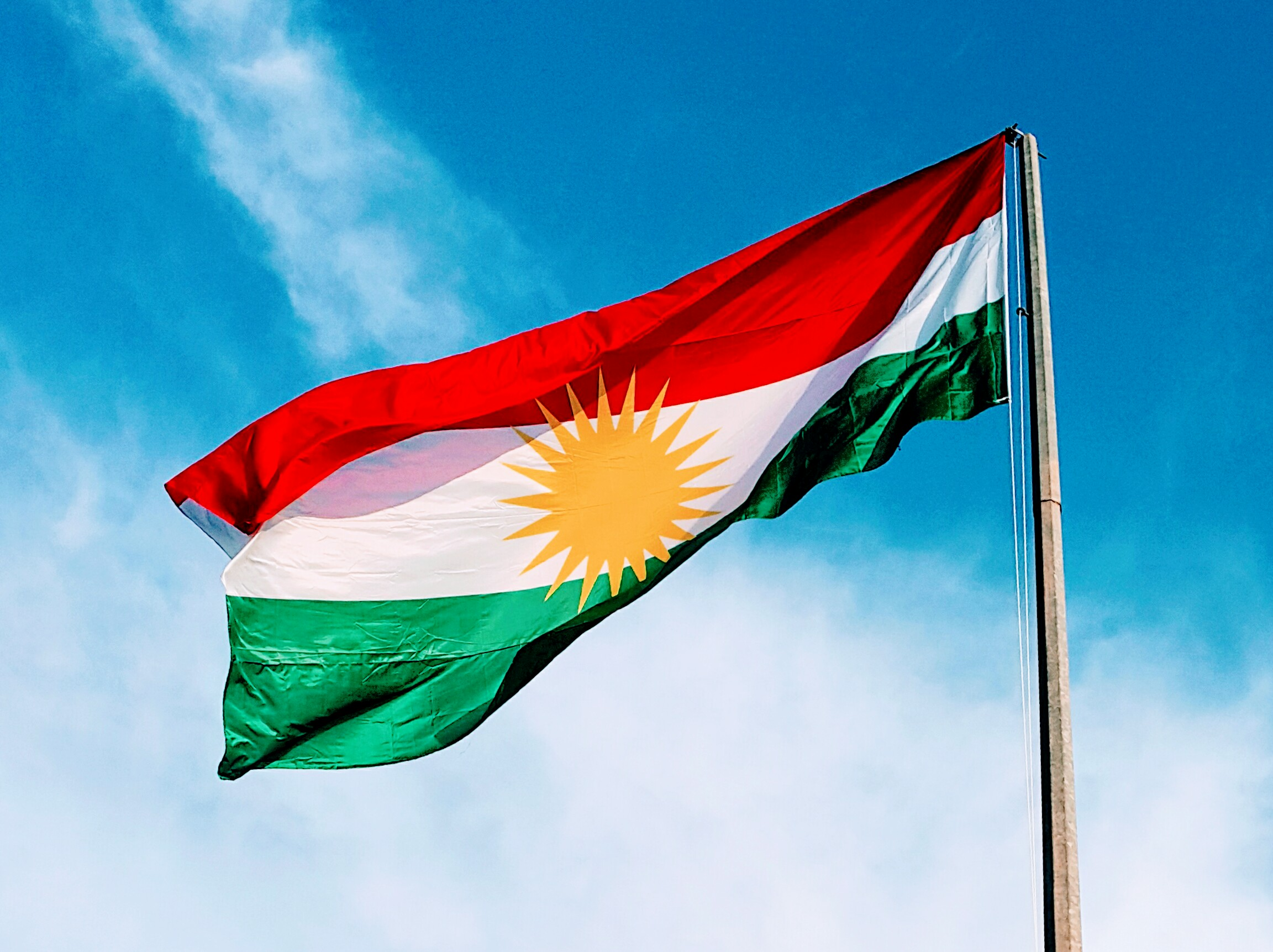
Flag of Kurdistan

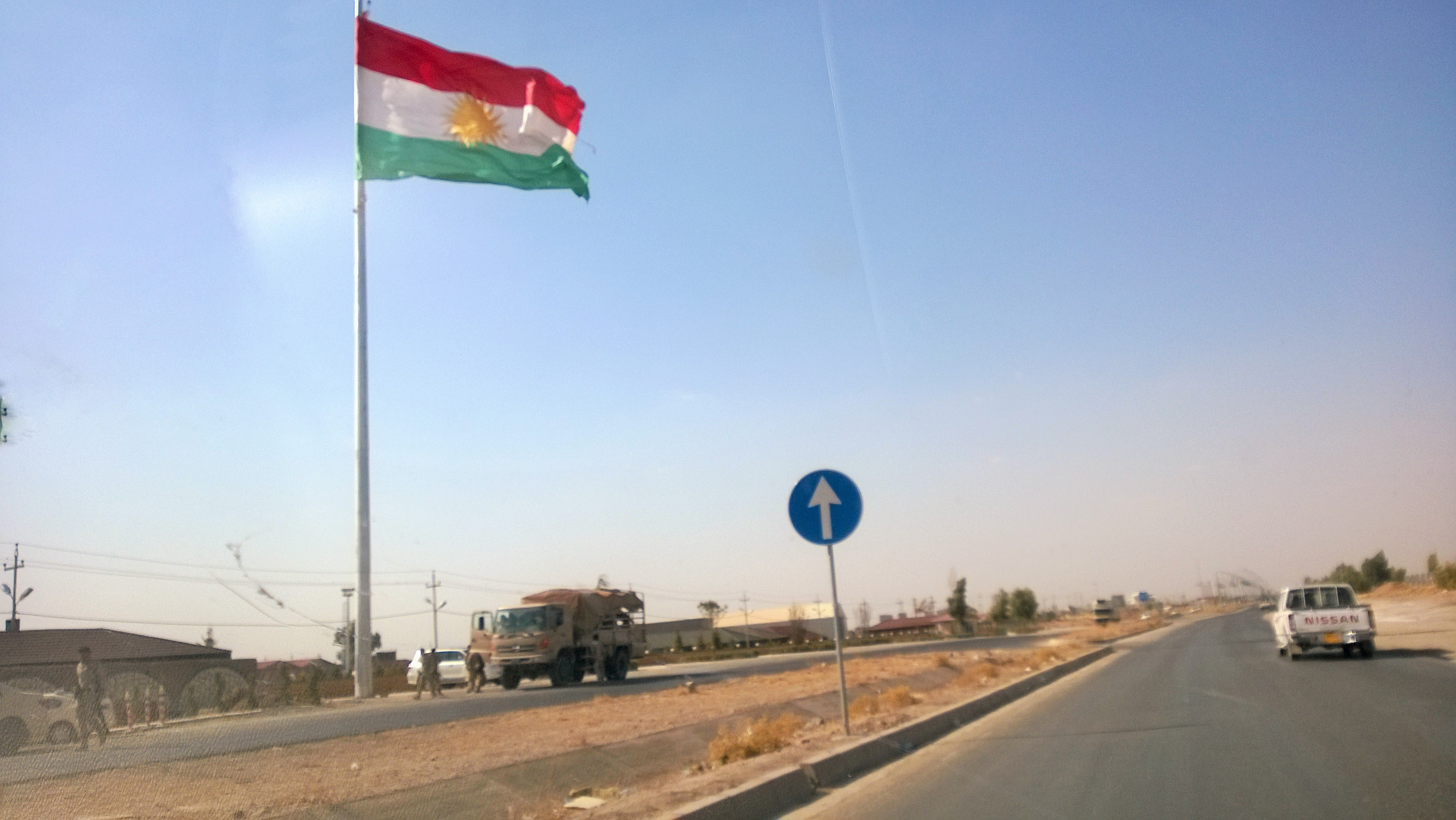
The flag of Kurdistan flies over the disputed city of Kirkuk after it was abandoned by Iraqi forces in June 2014 as the ISIS militant group approached.
