= Kurdish nationalism =

Political movement

Flag of Kurdistan

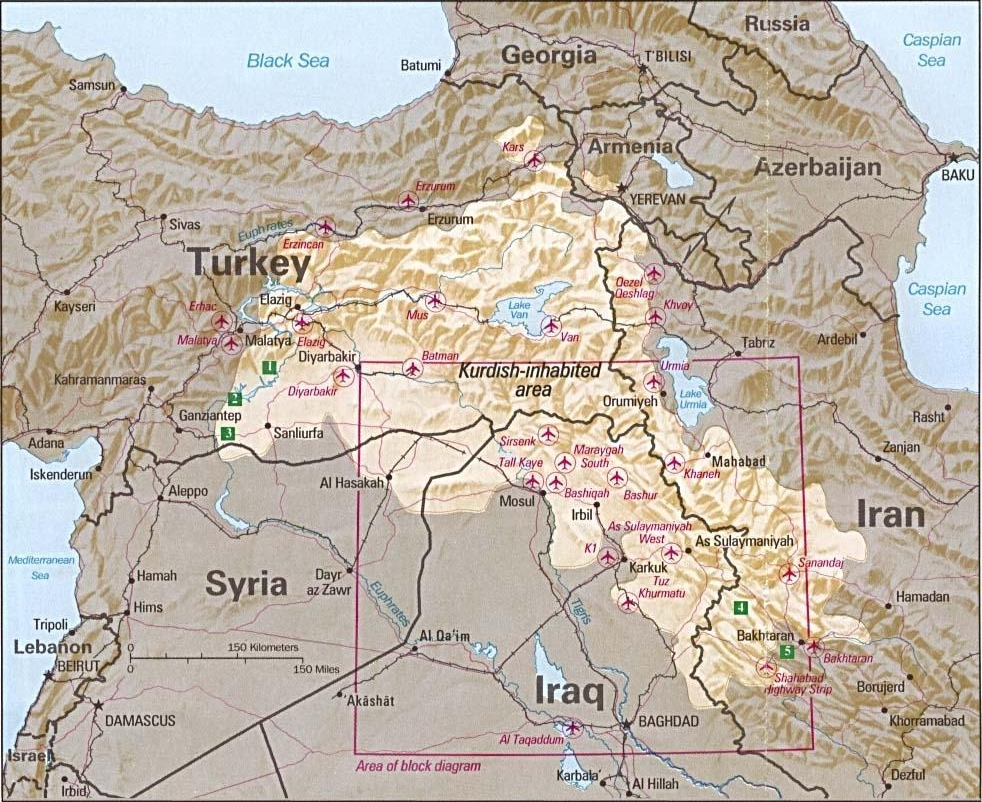
Kurdish-inhabited areas according to the CIA (1992)

Kurdish nationalism (Kurdish: کوردایەتی, romanized: Kurdayetî, lit. 'Kurdishness or Kurdism') is a nationalist political movement which asserts that Kurds are a nation and espouses the creation of an independent Kurdistan from Iran, Iraq, Syria, and Turkey.

Early Kurdish nationalism had its roots in the Ottoman Empire, within which Kurds were a significant ethnic group. With the partitioning of the Ottoman Empire, its Kurdish-majority territories were divided between the newly formed states of Turkey, Iraq, and Syria, making Kurds a significant ethnic minority in each state. Kurdish nationalist movements have long been suppressed by Turkey and in the states of Iran, Iraq, and Syria.

Since the 1970s, Iraqi Kurds have pursued the goal of greater autonomy and even outright independence against the Iraqi nationalist Ba'ath Party regimes, which responded with brutal repression, including the massacre of 50,000–100,000 Kurds in the Anfal campaign. The Kurdish–Turkish conflict, where Kurdish armed groups have fought against the state, has been ongoing since 1984. After the 1991 uprisings in Iraq, the United Nations enforced the Iraqi no-fly zones under Security Council Resolution 688, which included much of Iraqi Kurdistan, facilitating autonomy and self-government outside the control of the Iraqi government. After the 2003 invasion of Iraq that ousted Saddam Hussein, the Kurdistan Regional Government was established, enjoying a great measure of self-governance but stopping short of full independence.

== History ==
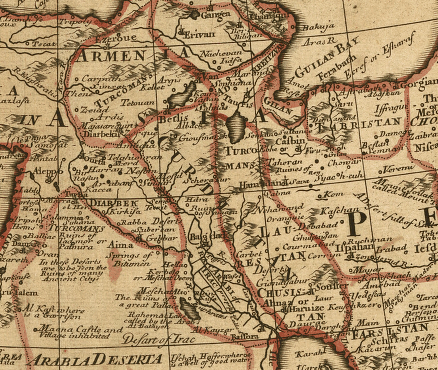
Kurdistan in an antique map.

Devastation from the war, as well as "looting and destruction of crops by Russian, Ottoman, and British [troops]... caused severe famine in the area". In such dire conditions, it was the central focus of all tribal leaders to rebuild their village/tribal infrastructure in order to provide for their own people. Major nationalist or political movements were not foremost in their minds; survival was the necessity.

The only chance that a Kurdish state would be formed was the revolt against the newly emerged Turkish Republic was Sheikh Ubeydullah but this was short lived, because the revolt was never strategic nor unified in a Kurdistan sense.

The Kurdish nationalist struggle first emerged in the late 19th century when a unified movement demanded the establishment of a Kurdish state. Revolts occurred sporadically, but only decades after the Ottoman centralist policies of the 19th century began did the first modern Kurdish nationalist movement emerge with an uprising led by a Kurdish landowner and head of the powerful Shemdinan family, Sheikh Ubeydullah. " In 1880 Ubeydullah demanded political autonomy or outright independence for Kurds and the recognition of a Kurdistan state without interference from Turkish or Persian authorities." The uprising against Qajar Persia and the Ottoman Empire was ultimately suppressed by the Ottomans, and Ubeydullah, along with other notables, was exiled to Istanbul. The Kurdish nationalist movement that emerged following World War I (1914-1918) and the 1922 end of the Ottoman Empire largely reacted to the changes taking place in mainstream Turkey, primarily the radical secularization (which the strongly Muslim Kurds abhorred), centralization of authority (which threatened the power of local chieftains and Kurdish autonomy), and rampant Turk ethnonationalism in the new Turkish Republic (which obviously threatened to marginalize Kurds). Western powers (particularly the United Kingdom) fighting the Turks promised the Kurds that they would act as guarantors for Kurdish freedom, a promise they subsequently broke. One particular organization, the Society for the Elevation of Kurdistan (Kürdistan Teali Cemiyeti) was central to the forging of a distinct Kurdish identity. It took advantage of period of political liberalization in during the Second Constitutional Era (1908–1920) of Turkey to transform a renewed interest in Kurdish culture and language into a political nationalist movement based on ethnicity. Around the start of the 20th century Russian anthropologists encouraged this emphasis on Kurds as a distinct ethnicity, suggesting that the Kurds were a European race (compared to the Asiatic Turks) based on physical characteristics and on the Kurdish language (which forms part of the Indo-European language-group). While these researchers had ulterior political motives (to sow dissent in the Ottoman Empire) their findings were embraced and still accepted today by many.

== Ottoman Empire ==
Partitioning of Ottoman Turkey according to the aborted Treaty of Sèvres called for a Kurdistan state in southeastern Anatolia

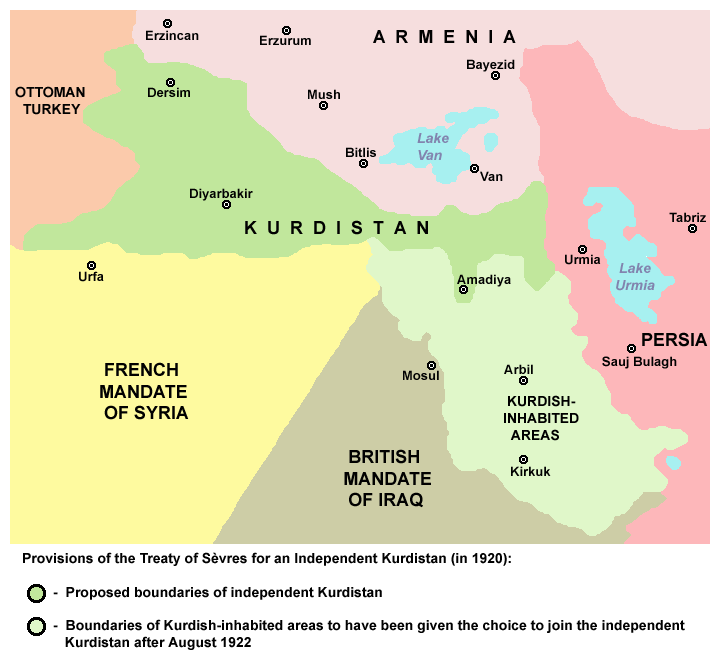
Provisions of the Treaty of Sèvres for an independent Kurdistan (in 1920). The Green territory representing a Kurdistan state with Diyarbakir (Amed) the capital of the Kurdish state.

Under the millet system, Kurds' primary form of identification was religious with Sunni Islam being the top in the hierarchy (millet-i hakimiye). While the Ottoman Empire embarked on a modernization and centralization campaign known as the Tanzimat (1829–1879), Kurdish regions retained much of their autonomy and tribal chiefs their power. The Sublime Porte made little attempt to alter the traditional power structure of "segmented, agrarian Kurdish societies" – agha, beg, sheikh, and tribal chief. Because of the Kurds' geographical position at the southern and eastern fringe of the empire and the mountainous topography of their territory, in addition to the limited transportation and communication system, agents of the state had little access to Kurdish provinces and were forced to make informal agreements with tribal chiefs. This bolstered the Kurds' authority and autonomy; for instance, the Ottoman qadi and mufti as a result did not have jurisdiction over religious law in most Kurd regions. In 1908, the Young Turks come to power asserting a radical form of Turkish ethnic identity and closed Ottoman associations and non-Turkish schools. They launched a campaign of political oppression and resettlement against ethnic minorities – Kurds, Laz people, and Armenians, but in the wartime context they could not afford to antagonize ethnic minorities too much. At the end of World War I, Kurds still had the legal right to conduct their affairs in Kurdish, celebrate unique traditions, and identify themselves as a distinct ethnic group. The Treaty of Sèvres signed in 1920 "suggested" an independent Kurdish and Armenian state but after the establishment of the Turkish Republic by a Turk ethnonationalist government which balked at the treaty, the 1923 Lausanne Treaty was signed which made no mention of the Kurds. The once politically unified Ottoman Kurdistan was then divided into the different administrative and political systems in Iraq, Turkey and Syria.

== The Paris Peace Conference and Treaty of Sèvres ==
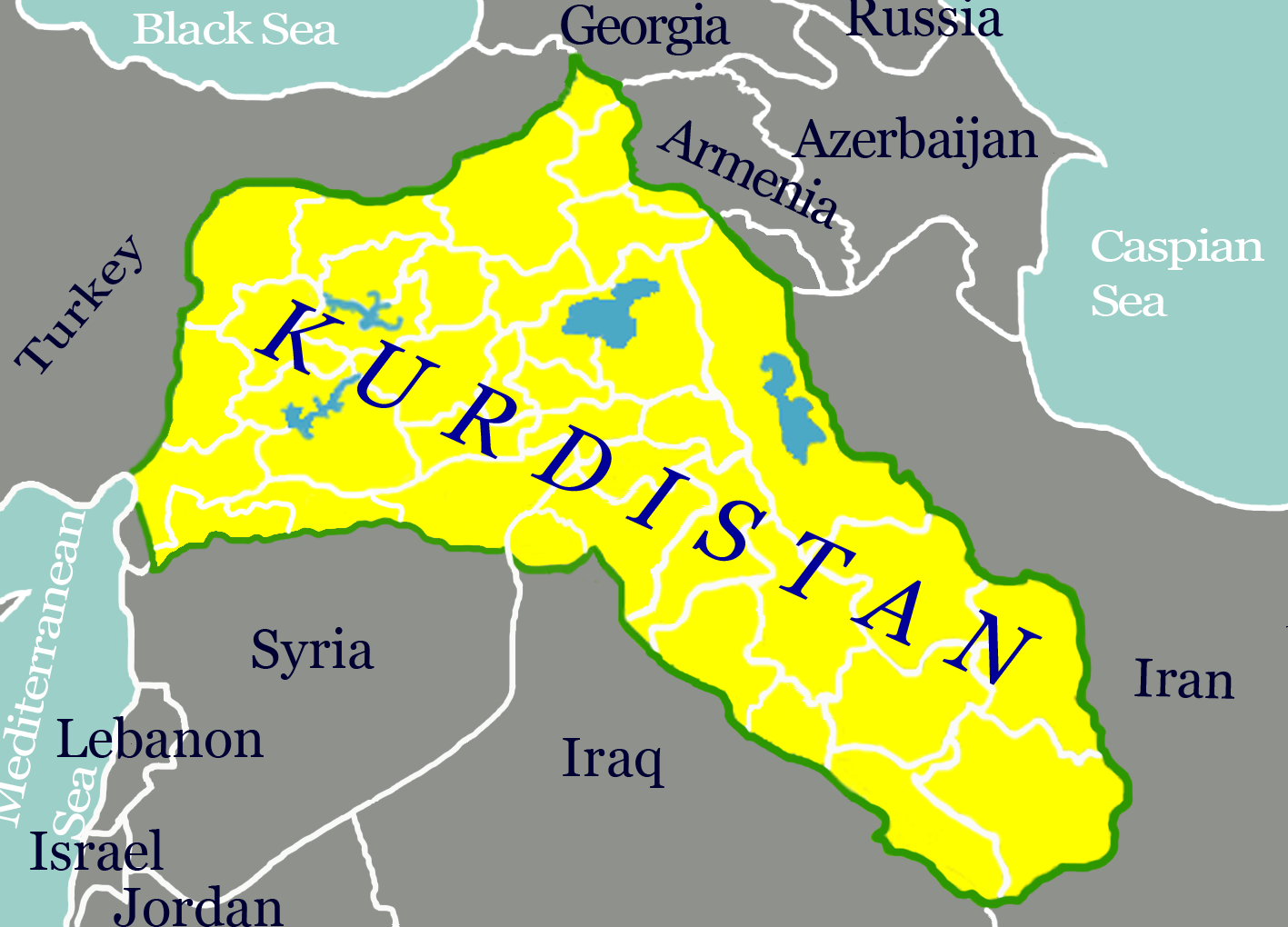
Maximum extent of the territories envisioned by Kurdish nationalists as part of a future state of Kurdistan

The first Kurdish political party originated in the Kurdish diaspora rather than from within Kurdistan. The organization known as Khoybun or in Kurdish Xoybûn (also known as the Kurdish League), or "Independence," was founded by a group of Kurdish intellectuals in Paris in 1918. These intellectuals saw the period following World War I as ripe for organizing a movement aimed at securing a Kurdish nation-state out of the ruins of the recently defeated Ottoman Empire.

After the cataclysm of World War I, the Paris Peace Conference offered the opportunity for a new world. The optimism and idealism promoted by U.S. President Woodrow Wilson aimed for a lasting peace reinforced by an international framework and fraternity of states. The principle of self- determination from Point Twelve of Wilson's Fourteen Points instilled false confidence in minority populations of the Ottoman Empire that they would soon be able to choose their own paths as independent nation-states.

The British found the Ottoman theater of the war much more difficult than they had imagined. At war's end, the British had a hard time maintaining troop concentrations in the Ottoman Empire. The cost of the war was enormous, and the politicians and population back in Britain sought to hasten troops' return home. The Allies' plans to carve up the Ottoman Empire were equally challenging to execute because the different peoples of the empire were seeking their own futures, rather than leaving outsiders or their old overlords to decide for them.

During the war, more attention was paid to the Armenians than to the Kurds. This was likely because the Armenians were primarily Christian, and thereby more prone to identify with the West and vice versa. The Kurds were considered complicit in the atrocities committed against the Armenians within the Ottoman Empire during the early stages of the war. Little attention was given to Kurdistan until after the war when the prevailing thought was a realignment of the Ottoman territories along the European model of nation-states in which Ottoman minorities each would govern their own people in their own territories. British Foreign Office documents of the time indicate a certainty of a future Armenian state, but leave out other parties such as the Kurds and the Assyrians. A sketch of the Draft Treaty of Peace between Turkey and the Allied Governments by Middle-Eastern Political Section of British Delegation and a map of the "Proposed Settlement of Turkey in Asia" depict various boundaries for Armenia, but make no mention of Kurdistan.

U.S. President Woodrow Wilson went so far as to order a draft of boundaries for an Armenian state. This was the atmosphere going into the end of the war and into the peace conference. The horrors of the war pushed idealism to its extreme in the minds of some negotiators and some heads of states, while the reality on the ground was starkly different from their grand visions of a new world. Other statesmen, particularly Lloyd-George and Clemenceau, had imperial interests in mind rather than the international peace and reconciliation that Wilson professed.

After the surrender of the Ottoman Empire and the close of World War I, plans for the lands, resources, and people under former Ottoman jurisdiction were negotiated. While the U.K. and France were drawing their lines on the map of the Middle East, the Americans, whom they invited to take up mandates in Armenia and Kurdistan, refused to become involved on the ground. U.S. foreign policy appeared hesitant because policymakers feared the U.S become entangled in a colonial-style scheme that ran counter to U.S. ideals and taxpayer wishes. According to Tejirian, "the internationalism of the 1910s, which followed the first acquisitions of the 'American empire' after the Spanish-American War and led to U.S. entry into World War I, was followed by the isolationism of the 1920s, emphasized most dramatically by U.S. refusal to join the League of Nations." Lack of international sponsorship was a problem that would plague the Kurds.

The Foreign Office's Political Intelligence Department presented British negotiators with a thorough study of the Ottoman Empire's lands and peoples before they attended negotiations in Paris. This document placed heavy emphasis on Armenia and commitments to the French and Arabs. The situation of Kurdistan was addressed with the statement, "We are thus committed to the partition of Kurdistan into three sections, in the two largest of which certain rights are secured to ourselves, the French, and the Arabs, but none to the Kurds." The study noted the strategic value of Kurdistan thus:

The Power paramount in this country will command the strategic approaches to Mesopotamia and control the water supply of the eastern affluents of the Tigris, on which the irrigation of Mesopotamia largely depends. It is therefore essential that the paramount Power in Kurdistan and Mesopotamia should be the same; in other words, that Great Britain should have an exclusive position in Kurdistan as opposed to any other outside power. At the same time, the arguments against annexation apply even more strongly to Kurdistan than to Mesopotamia. It is desirable that the county (sic) should form an independent confederation of tribes and towns, and that His Majesty's Government should assume functions intermediate between the administrative assistance, amounting to direct responsibility for the conduct of government, which they intend to undertake in Mesopotamia, and the mere control of external relations, to which they propose to limit themselves in the case of the independent rulers of the Arabian Peninsula. In the hills British control should be exerted with the least direct intervention possible. In the lowlands bordering on Mesopotamia, where there are important oil-fields and other natural resources, it may have to approximate to the Mesopotamian pattern.

The Kurdish representative at the Paris Peace Conference was General Muhammad Sharif Pasha. After the Young Turk Revolution deposed Sultan Abdulhamid II and sentenced Sharif Pasha to death, he fled the Ottoman Empire. Sharif Pasha had offered his services to the British at the beginning of the war, but his offer had been refused because the British did not anticipate their being engaged with operations in Kurdistan. He spent the war years in Monte Carlo waiting for another opportunity. Despite his disappointment with the British, Sharif Pasha reestablished his contact with the British near the end of the war. In 1918, he began communicating with Sir Percy Cox, the head of British forces in Mesopotamia, to discuss establishing British protection over an autonomous Kurdistan. He argued for similar arrangements in Mesopotamia and elsewhere, describing something akin to the mandate system. He also argued for a British sponsored committee aimed at reconciling relations between the Kurds and the Armenians. Kurdish nationalist organizations nominated Sharif Pasha as their representative at the Paris Peace Conference because of his strategic views and high level contacts within the British government.

At Paris, Sharif Pasha carefully laid out Kurdish claims to territory and constructed an argument for Kurdish independence. His claims were based on areas where Kurds constituted the dominant population. He included the Persian Empire's Kurdish territories in addition to Ottoman lands. His inclusion of the Persian Kurdish lands was merely to make a point that the Kurds were a large nation spanning a large area, thereby worthy of a homeland free from the outside interference that had often plagued Kurdistan.

Delegates representing the Kurds, the Armenians, and the Assyrians presented claims to territory and independence. Bughos Nubar, the chief Armenian delegate, had confided to Sir Louis Mallet of the British Delegation fears that the Allies were "abandoning Armenia to her fate." He worried about French ambition in Armenia, and sought British and US recognition for Armenian independence.

Sharif Pasha and Bughos Nubar agreed to support each other's bid for independence even if there were disagreements as to the particulars of territory. The two presented overlapping claims and criticized each other's demands, but the scheme worked. The negotiators were convinced that both the Kurds and the Armenians deserved homelands in the new Middle East, and granted provisions for statehood and self-determination in the resulting Treaty of Sèvres.

Sharif Pasha grew frustrated with the Allies over his sidelining in negotiations and with the Kurdish League over his agreement with the Armenians, and eventually resigned his post. Following his marginalization, Sharif produced a pamphlet outlining the justification for Kurdistan's territories. He began with historical claims to the lands, noting many academic works on the geography of Kurdistan and taking care to distinguish between Kurdish and Armenian lands. His argument against the Armenian claims in Kurdistan is that greater Armenia is not "the ethnical cradle of their race." In an unusual turn in his case, Sharif asserts that the Armenians in Kurdistan came as émigrés, abandoning agriculture in Armenia for urban life in Kurdistan. Sharif further accuses the European powers and Turkey of conspiracy against the Kurds by inventing Armenian history in Kurdish lands. He likely made this last statement out of anger from being sidelined at the conference. Nevertheless, Sharif Pasha made a difference in that his case for a Kurdish homeland was written into the peace treaty. The "Kurdistan" specified in the treaty did not include all of the Kurdish territories, but it contained a large portion of Ottoman Kurdistan.

Some groups formerly under Ottoman dominion desired reclamation of lands they perceived as their own. Greek irredentism gained the support of the British, thus enabling them to land Greek forces at Izmir. However, the Greeks became too covetous toward the Turks, and found themselves on the retreat before Turkish retaliation near the plateau of Ankara. The Turks had found a new nationalist leader. The fall of the Ottoman Empire and its Sultanate was certain.

== Kurds in Turkey (Bakur) ==
The Treaty of Sèvres represented to the Turks. This new treaty made no direct mention of the Kurds or Kurdistan, rather Ottoman Kurdistan was divided among Turkey and the two Arab states to the south, Iraq and Syria, which were under British and French mandates respectively. The following sections are a brief glimpse of the Kurds' activities in Turkey and Iraq after the division of territories between the two states.

By the enforcement of laws such as Article 57 of the Turkish Constitution of 1982 which outlaws "any activity harmful to national unity and territorial integrity of the Turkish Republic", Kurdish civic rights can be constrained within the context of a Constitution guaranteeing equality without acknowledging them as a distinct group. Equal citizenship rights were enshrined in Turkey's 1920 Provisional Constitution. Article 8 asserted that the country was composed of both Turks and Kurds but under the law they would be treated as common citizens. However, the 1923 formation of the Republic of Turkey marked the beginning of continuing period of reduced civic rights for Kurds. The Caliphate was abolished a year later as well as all public expressions and institutions of Kurdish identity. Kurdish madrasas, newspapers, religious fraternal organizations, and associations were shut down.

To give an example of the early republican government's attitude towards the citizenship rights of Kurds, Law No. 1850 was introduced after popular revolts, giving after-the-fact legal sanction to civilians and military personnel who killed Kurds during the revolt.

Kurdish regions were placed under martial law and the use of the Kurdish language, dress, folklore, and names prohibited. It was this continued repression that led to reemergence of Kurdish nationalism in the 1960s and 1970s. During this period the primary goal of the movement was to resolve its grievances with the Turkish government through legitimate channels. These attempts were heavily suppressed.

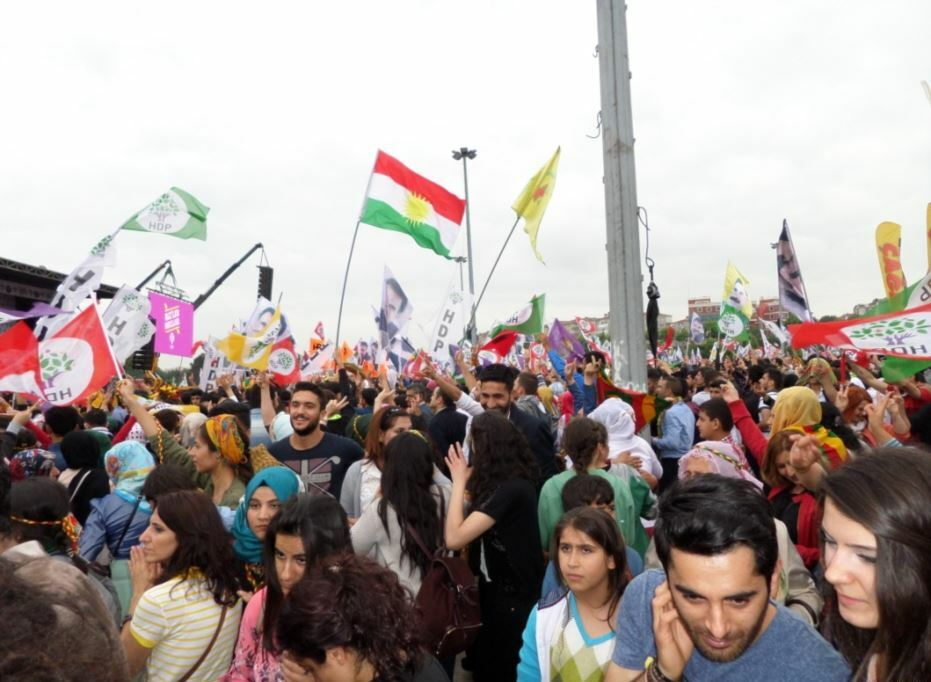
Pro-Kurdish HDP supporters celebrating election results in Istanbul, 8 June 2015

Civic rights were temporarily improved with the Turkish Constitution of 1961 which allowed freedom of expression, the press, and association for Kurds. The 1964 Political Parties Act criminalized Kurdish political parties and the acknowledgment of the existence of different languages and races in Turkey. The 1972 Law of Association further restricted rights to association and political organization.

The failure to address the Kurdish grievances throughout the 1960s and 1970s led to alternate avenues of resolution. In 1984 the Kurdistan Workers Party (PKK) started a guerrilla insurgency against the Turkish Republic. The PKKs insurgency continued to be a violent insurgency until the lasting ceasefire in 1999. Throughout this period there was a significant loss of life in addition to many social and political changes.

In 1991, Law 2932 was repealed and the Kurdish language was allowed for informal speech and music but not for political or education purposes or in the mass media. The same year a new Anti-Terror bill was passed which defined terrorism as "any kind of action with the aim of changing characteristics of the Republic" essentially criminalizing Kurdish political activism and many basic forms of expression. In 2004 laws were further liberalized allowing Kurdish-language broadcasts and other restrictions, including the giving of Kurdish names to infants have been removed.

== Kurds in Iraq (Bashur) ==
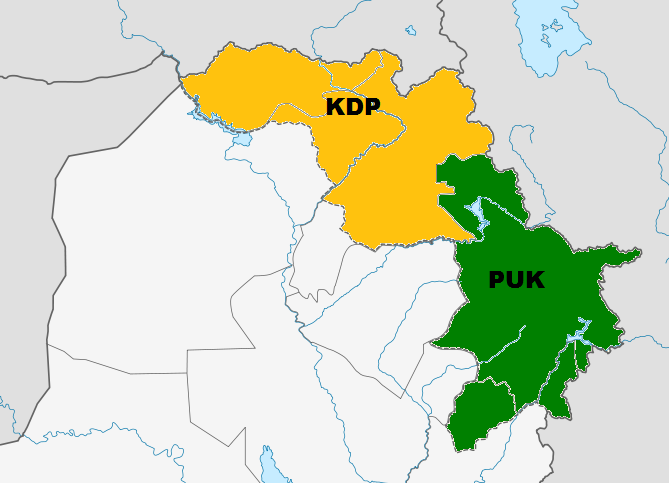
KDP and PUK controlled areas of Kurdistan after the Iraqi Kurdish Civil War.

=== British Mandate after World War I ===
After World War I Iraq came under a British mandate. Many Kurds did try to establish an independent Kurdish state but they failed, declaring the unrecognized, failed Kingdom of Kurdistan. Later, the British granted the Kurds in Iraq some regional self-administration. There was an attempt to guarantee Kurdish ethnic identity in the 1921 Provisional Iraqi Constitution which stated that Iraq was composed of multiple different ethnic groups with equal rights, and enshrined the equal legal status of the Kurdish language with Arabic, however, the recognition of Kurdish appeared to be more symbolic. Two informal policies emerged regarding Kurds in Iraq: one for non-tribal urban dwellers and one for rural tribal population meant to discourage urban migration. The government institutionalized advantages for rural Kurds – tribes had special legal jurisdiction, tax benefits, and informally guaranteed seats in parliament. In addition, the rural Kurds were exempt from two of the strongest facets of the modern state; they had their own schools and were outside the jurisdiction of national courts. This privileged position lasted into the 1950s. Kurdish rights were further entrenched in 1932 by the Local Languages Law, a condition of the League of Nations (Headed by the United Kingdom) being that to join, Iraq had to enact constitutional protection for the Kurds. Political rights were fairly open in the interwar years as continued British internal interference and a series of weak government prevented any one movement from dominating national politics prevented the creation of a formal exclusionary citizenship. However, later the central governments nation-building strategy centered around a secular conception of national identity based upon a sentiment of Iraqi unity (al-wadha al-iraqiyya) with the government dominated by Sunni Ba'athists Within this new framework, as non-Arabs, the status of the Kurds would decline.

=== After World War II ===
The 1960s and 1970s demonstrated a pattern. The new Arabist leader would assert his belief in the Kurds as distinct and equal ethnic group in Iraq with political rights. For instance, the Constitution of 1960 claims "Kurds and Arabs are partners within this nation. The Constitution guarantees their rights within the framework of the Iraqi republic". Once successful at consolidating their power they would repress Kurdish political rights, militarize Kurdish regions, ban nationalist political parties, destroy Kurdish villages, and forcibly impose resettlement (especially in petroleum-rich areas). As a result, from late 1961 onwards there was near constant strife in Iraqi Kurdistan. A major development was made when the Iraqi government and Kurdish leaders signed the 1970 Peace Agreement. It promised Kurdish self-rule, recognition of the bi-national character of Iraq, political representation in the central government, extensive official language rights, the freedom of association and organization, and several other concessions aimed at restoring full civic rights to the Kurdish population. It was to come into effect within four years.

=== After the Gulf War ===
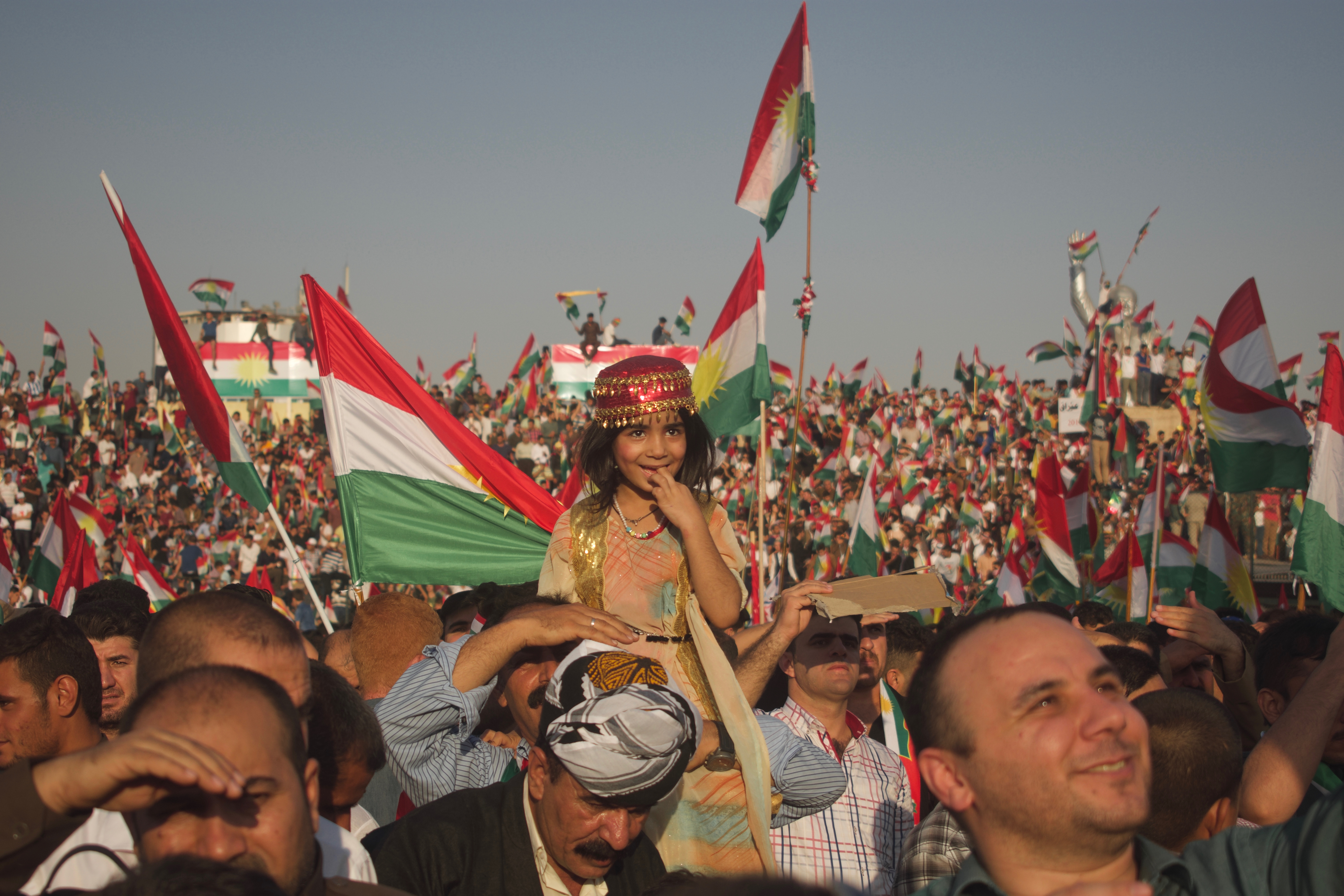
Pro-independence rally in Erbil, Iraqi Kurdistan, 22 September 2017

After the Gulf War an autonomous "safe haven" was established in Northern Iraq under UN with U.S. Air Force and British Royal Air Force air protection. Under the democratically elected Kurdistan Region, citizens experienced civic rights never previously enjoyed. Student unions, NGOs, and women's organizations emerged as forces in a new civic society and institutionalized tolerance for the region's own ethnic, religious, and language minorities. Since the 2003 invasion of Iraq and the downfall of Saddam Hussein, the Kurdish population has found itself drawn back into Iraq with promises of autonomy and citizenship based on a federal, ethnically inclusive model with strong minority rights and guarantees against discrimination. Coming after the 2005 Kurdistan Region independence referendum voted 98.98% in favor of independence, the new Iraqi Constitution adopted in 2005 grants governmental autonomy to the Kurdistan Region, establishes Kurdish as an official language alongside Arabic, acknowledges the national rights of the Kurdish people, and promises equality of citizens regardless of race or religion. Kurdish military forced helped defeat ISIL during the Iraqi Civil War (2014–2017) and gained territory, including Kirkuk and surrounding oil fields. The 2017 Kurdistan Region independence referendum took place on September 25, with 92.73% voting in favor of independence. This triggered a military operation in which the Iraqi government retook control of Kirkuk and other areas once held by the KRG after the war against ISIS, and forced the KRG to annul the referendum.

=== Modern history ===
The Kurds represent a minority people of Iraq, with a language, culture and identity distinct and separate from the Arab majority. For much of the past century those traditions have been marginalized and the interests of the Kurds sidelined.

In the Saddam years there was a deliberate process of persecution and "Arabisation" of Kurdish areas, culminating in the late 1980s with the Anfal campaign that destroyed thousands of villages and killed huge numbers of civilians. The chemical weapons attack on Halabja in March 1988 killed as many as 5,000 in a day.

In 1974 the weaker Law of Autonomy in the Area of Kurdistan was actually implemented with much weaker citizenship protections and conflict soon resumed. The 1980s, especially during the Iran–Iraq War, were a particularly low point for Kurdish rights within Iraq. Approximately 500,000 Kurdish civilians were sent to detention camps in southern and eastern Iraq and the Iraqi armed forces razed villages and hamlets in and near the battle area. It is also during this time that the Iraqi military used chemical weapons on Kurdish towns.

== Kurds in Syria (Rojava) ==
Many Kurds consider the Kurdish-majority regions of northern and northeastern Syria to be Western Kurdistan (Kurdish: Rojavaye Kurdistane) and seek political autonomy within Syria (akin to Iraqi Kurdistan in Iraq) or outright independence as part of an independent Kurdistan.

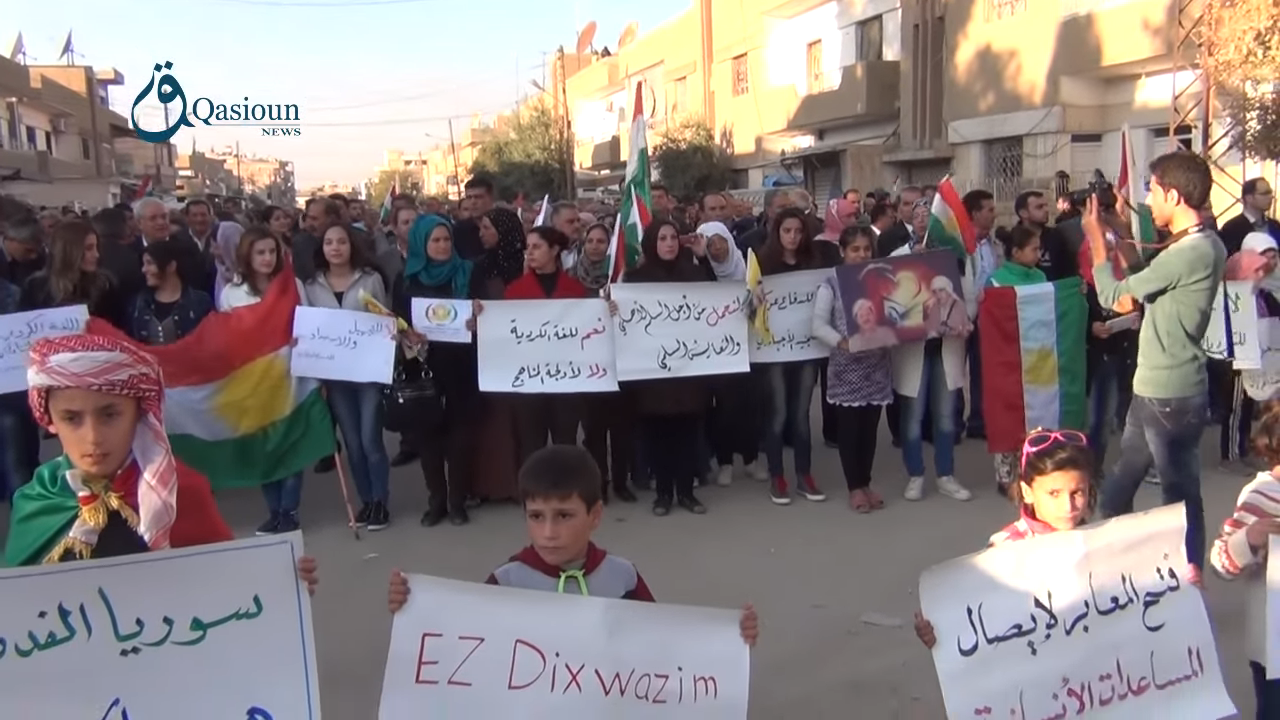
Supporters of the nationalist Kurdish National Council demonstrate against the education policy of the Autonomous Administration of North and East Syria, Qamishli, November 2015

After the failed Sheikh Said rebellion, thousands of Northern Kurds fled their homes to live among the Syrian Kurds of Western Kurdistan in the French Mandate of Syria. Under the Mandate, Kurds and other minorities enjoyed privileges denied to the Sunni Arab majority. The French authorities facilitated minority independence movements, as well as recruited and trained minorities for its local militias, as part of a divide and rule strategy. The repression of Kurdish civic rights began with the independence of the Syrian Arab Republic in 1946. It escalated with the short-lived unification of Syria and Egypt as the United Arab Republic in 1958, partly in response to more vocal Kurdish demands for democracy, recognition as an ethnic group, and complaints that the state police and military academies were closed to Kurds. 120,000 Kurds (40% of the Syrian Kurd population) were stripped of their citizenship in the 1962 Census when the government claimed they were, in fact, Turks and Iraqis illegally residing in the country. Stripped of their nationality, these now stateless Kurds still found themselves subject to its obligations through conscription in the military. The Kurdish language and cultural expressions were banned. In 1962, the Syrian government announced its Arab Belt plan (later renamed "plan for establishment of model state farms"), intended to forcibly expel the Kurdish population from a 350 km long, 10 to 15 km deep strip of land along Syria's northeast border and replaced them with Arab settlers, and which was partially implemented. There was no change in policy under the new Ba'athist regime post-1963. It refused to implement its program of land reforms that was benefiting Arab peasants in areas Kurds would predominantly benefit until 1971. From the 1970s on there was a relaxation of official treatment of Kurds, but the late 1980s saw renewed widespread denial of Syrian citizenship status to Syrian Kurds, especially in refusing national identity documents such as passports.

Since the beginning of the Syrian Civil War, Syrian government forces have abandoned many Kurdish-populated areas, leaving the Kurds to fill the power vacuum and govern these areas autonomously. While the Autonomous Administration of North and East Syria (AANES) was originally based in predominantly Kurdish areas, it has come to encompass much of Arabistan to the south. The AANES disavows nationalism, seeking the federalisation of Syria instead. The most influential Kurdish nationalist group in Syria is the Kurdish National Council, which is affiliated with the Kurdistan Democratic Party in Iraqi Kurdistan.

== Kurds in Iran (Rojhalat) ==
The similarity between Kurdish and Persian language and culture compared to the Turks and Arabs, the more equal population balance between the ethnic majority Persians and ethnic minorities like the Kurds has resulted in a somewhat different citizenship experience for Iranian Kurds, as such most seek autonomy rather than independence.

=== Under the Qajar Empire ===
Iranian group identification and social order was based on religious identification with Islam, specifically Shia Islam, the dominant sect. While the majority of Kurds are Sunni, in Iran they were roughly evenly split between Sunnis, Shias, and Shia splinter groups like the Sufis. Because of this preoccupation with religion over ethnicity, in practice Kurds were treated as part of the majority and enjoyed extensive citizenship rights. Unlike the Ottoman Empire, this social order was maintained while the imperial system declined and modern Iranian identity was forged by a reform movement in the late 19th century to the benefit of Kurds.

Under this regime, Sunni and Shia Kurds held a privileged position as Muslims. Unlike the other minorities, Christian Armenians, Jews, Zoroastrians and others, they had the right to work in food production and buy crown land. They also benefited from the tuyal land tenure system which favoured Muslims. This advantage allowed Kurds to establish strong control over food production and land. The notable absence of ethnic restrictions on holding government office allowed Kurdish tribal leaders and notables to purchase office and establish a strong Kurdish presence in Iranian politics without having to culturally assimilate or deny ethnicity. This political presence was bolstered because the Qajars appointed many tribal chiefs to government positions in exchange for internal security assurances. Within this system many Kurds reached prominent military, political, and diplomatic positions. Exceptional in Iran during the 19th century and early 20th was that the nationalist reform movement did not develop a radical, exclusionary, ethnic-based conception of nationality but developed an Iranian identity that did not define itself as ethnically Persian.

=== Constitutional monarchy ===
The existing beneficial social framework changed with the establishment of a constitutional monarchy by Reza Shah in 1925. Similar to other states, he tried to nation-build by creating an exclusionary nationality based on a secular, ethnically Persian Iranian identity and repress the cultural expressions and equal status of ethnic minorities. These minorities, including the Kurds were coerced into accepting Persian culture and many were arrested for speaking the Kurdish language. However, Kurds were afforded a special position in the official state ethnic-based nationalism because of their cultural similarity to the Persians and their non-Arab ethnicity. Also, the distribution of seats in the Majlis (parliament) was based on religion, not ethnicity, the Kurds were able to exercise greater political power than non-Muslim minorities like the Armenians and Jews. The state's system of military conscription and centralized education served to integrate urban Kurdish populations but the majority remained rural. After World War II with the Soviet withdrawal from Kurdish regions (where they had encouraged autonomous Kurdish government as the Mahabad Republic), the Shah banned some Kurdish political parties, expressions of cultural identity ended the open political party system and ruled by firman. In 1958 there was a marked liberalization which allowed the activities of Kurdish cultural organizations and student associations but still limited political parties. Unlike other countries the Kurds were free to publish cultural and historical information in their own language. However, with massive investment and military aid from the western world, in the 1950s and 1960s Iran became a police state which clamped down on many civil rights.

=== Post-Revolutionary Iran ===
After the Iranian Revolution, some Kurdish groups (chiefly the Democratic Party of Iranian Kurdistan) allied with Iranian leftist and communist groups against Ayatollah Khomeini's government. The Kurdish rebellion for autonomy in 1979 was forcibly suppressed by Tehran, with thousands of Kurdish rebels and civilians killed as a result.

The new theocratic government developed a new exclusionary conception of nationalism based on very conservative Shia Islam. Once Khomeini consolidated power he expelled Sunni Kurds from government office, placed restrictions on freedom of expression, and militarized Kurdish regions as part of the war with Iraq. Still compared to other countries Kurds were still allowed limited publications, to celebrate holidays, wear traditional dress, and use Kurdish (except as a language of instruction). Significant improvements were made in 1997 whereby the government allowed a profusion of Kurdish language in media, although some of these publications were later restricted.

=== PJAK insurrection ===
The Iranian government has been facing a low-level guerrilla warfare against the ethnic secessionist Kurdish guerrilla group Party for a Free Life in Kurdistan (PJAK) since 2004. PJAK is closely affiliated with the Kurdish militant group Kurdistan Workers' Party (PKK) operating against Turkey.

== Women and nationalism ==
Kurdish women have been at the forefront of resistance, participating in armed struggles, grassroots organizing, and civil society initiatives. Their contributions have been instrumental in building a cohesive and inclusive nationalist movement that acknowledges the intersectionality of struggles and recognizes the need for an equitable society. Women have actively engaged in the nationalist struggle, demanding not only Kurdish rights but also challenging the patriarchal structures within their own communities. Kurdish women have consistently advocated for gender equality, emphasizing the need to address both national and gender-based oppressions simultaneously. Their activism has reshaped the understanding of nationalism, intertwining it with feminist perspectives and emphasizing the importance of inclusivity and empowerment for all.

=== Historical background ===
It has been documented by Western travellers and historians that Kurdish women historically have experienced greater freedoms than other women in the Middle East. Kurdish women would ride on horseback, wield swords, wear colorful clothes, have their hair uncovered, and dance hand in hand with men. Kurdish society was mostly patriarchal before the late 20th century, however many cases of women rising to prominence, and power which has been attributed to their relative freedom and respectability in society.

Some examples of women in positions of power include Asenath Barzani, Khanzade Sultan, Black Lady Fatima, Perikhan Khatun, and Adela Khanim amongst others. Asenath Barzani was the first female rabbi in pre-modern Jewish history who became the first female head of Yeshiva. Khanzade Sultan commanded an army of forty to fifty thousand in the 17th century. Black Lady Fatima, as the chief of her tribe, commanded her four thousand horsemen into war on her Arabian thoroughbred in the 1850s. Perikhan Khatun was the renowned chieftain of the Raman tribe, whose son Émin, who was also a chieftain, was known by his mother’s name as Émin ê Perikhan (Émin of Perikhan), rather than his father’s name. Adela Khanum was the ruler of Halabja, and the chieftain of the Jaff tribe, one of the most powerful Kurdish tribes at the beginning of the 20th century. Even Osman Pasha Jaff was referred to as Adela Khanim’s husband. She has many contributions to Halabja, but also to foreign diplomacy that she is remembered by. Not only did she revitalize Halabja economically and established law and order, but she is also known as the “Princess of the Brave” by the British for accepting British captives as refugees within her house. Adela Khanim was unchallenged until her death. In some districts of Kurdistan, it was fairly common for women to rule, to the point where it was explicitly referred to in the records of Ottoman customary law. The historical openness to female leaders in Kurdish societies has been attributed as a catalyser for the contemporary standing of Kurdish women as equals in society and their feminist revolution.

=== 20th century ===
Throughout the 20th century, Kurdish women actively participated in nationalist movements, advocating for the rights and recognition of the Kurdish people. They played vital roles in various aspects against state oppression, including military and guerrilla movements, cultural preservation, social mobilization and political activism.

During the 20th century, Kurdish women actively participated in cultural and social organizations that aimed to promote Kurdish identity and nationalism. Examples are the "Society for the Advancement of Kurdish Women, that was formed in 1919 in Istanbul, and was the first organization formed by Kurdish women. Or in the context of the Republic of Mahabad, a short-lived Kurdish state established in Iran in 1946, where women were encouraged to participate in public life. The Republic promoted women's active involvement in political activities and education, fostering greater gender equality within the Kurdish nationalist movement.

=== Present day ===
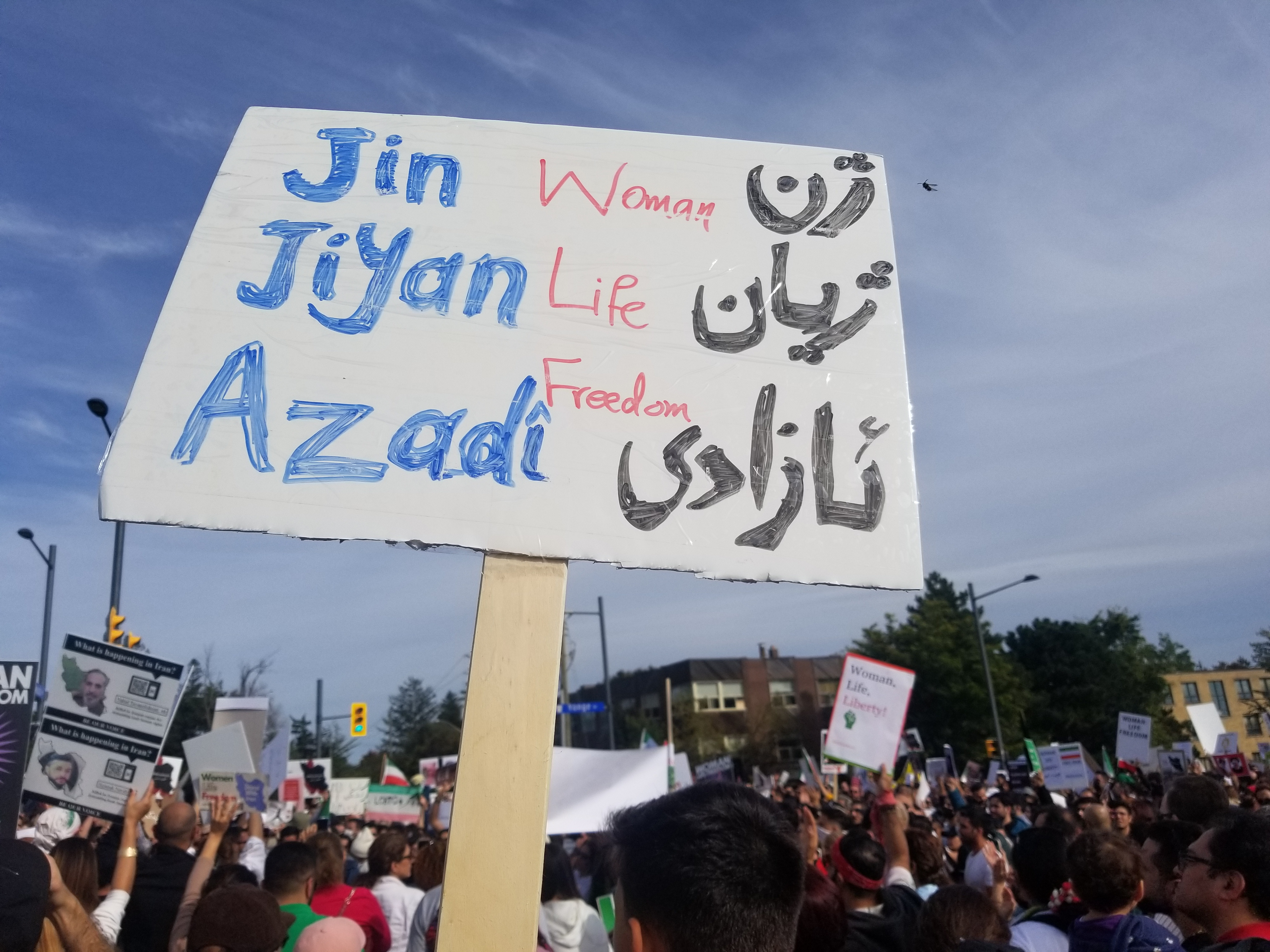
"Jin Jiyan Azadi" protest sign

In today's Kurdish nationalism, women have powerful positions in both politics and the military. They oppose gender stereotypes and promote gender equality. Women have key roles and make up a sizeable share of the PKK and Kurdish political organizations' ranks thanks to their adoption of inclusive policies. Kurdish women actively participate in politics, serve in the armed forces, and fight for progressive laws in places like Rojava (Syria). Their participation represents a fundamental shift in public attitudes as well as a persistent battle for women's rights within the Kurdish nationalism movement. According to Amnesty International's yearly human rights report, the enduring problem of pervasive discrimination faced by Iranian ethnic minorities, including Kurds, limits their opportunities for education, employment, and adequate housing. For this reason Kurdish identity and women's rights have become central to the resisting movement, with Kurdish women in Iran bravely challenging oppressive conditions, state violence, and the hijab regulations. They demand freedom from repression, patriarchy, and the right to determine their own choices. The protests feature chants such as "Women, life and freedom" ("Jin Jiyan Azadi"), echoing the Kurdish Freedom Movement's call for women's liberation.

== Notable Kurdish dynasties and countries ==
In the realm of Kurdish nationalism, the term "Kurdistan" refers back to the 11th-century Seljuk chronicles. Spanning various eras, a multitude of influential Kurdish dynasties, emirates, principalities, chiefdoms, and regions associated with the Kurdish state emerged, shaping the narrative of Kurdish nationalism.

=== Early ===
- Marwanid dynasty (985/990–1085)
- Shaddadids (951–1199)
- Anazids (990/91–1117)
- Ayyubid dynasty (1171–1341)

=== 20th-21st century ===
- Kurdish State (1918–1919)
- Kingdom of Kurdistan (1921–1924 and 1925)
- Kurdistansky Uyezd "Red Kurdistan" (1923–1929)
- Republic of Ararat (1927–1931)
- Republic of Mahabad (1946–1947)

== Kurds in the diaspora ==
An academic source published by the University of Cambridge has stated: "Kurdish nationalists in the diaspora, as long-distance nationalist actors, have played a crucial role in the development of Kurdish nationalism both inside and outside the region. They strongly hold on to a Kurdish identity and promote the territoriality of this unified nation. In line with the contemporary international normative framework, they use the rhetoric of suffering, the incidents of human rights abuses and their right to statehood to influence the way host states, other states, international organizations, scholars, journalists and the international media perceive their case and the actions of their home states. They promote the idea that Kurdistan is one country artificially divided among regional states and that this dividedness is the source of Kurdish suffering."

== Kurdish population ==
Accurate population figures for the Kurds are hard to establish for several reasons: several countries in the region do not break out Kurdish population in their censuses; competing political agendas seek to either maximize or minimize the size of the Kurdish population; different counting methods may include or exclude groups such as Zazas; both Iraq and Syria have suffered war and civil disturbance in recent years; and high population growth among Kurdish communities means that figures become outdated quickly.

The figures below are the best recent estimates available from apparently independent sources.

- Turkey: Research in 2010 indicated a population of 13.26 million Kurds living in Turkey, 18.3% of the overall population of 72.553 million.
- Iran: Approximately 6.7–8.2 million Kurds live in Iran.
- Iraq: 5.6–8.5 million
- Syria: 1.6 million-2.5 million

== See also ==
- History of the Kurdish people
- Kurdish Islamism
- Kurdification
- Human rights of Kurdish people in Turkey
- Rise of nationalism under the Ottoman Empire
- Biji Kurdistan
- A Modern History of the Kurds by David McDowall
- Sykes–Picot Agreement
