= Barzan =

Barzan can refer to:

== Geography ==
- Barzan, Kurdistan Region, Iraq, a town in Erbil Governorate, Kurdistan Region, Iraq
- Barzan, Iran, a village in Lorestan Province, Iran
- Barzan, alternate name of Sevaldi, a village in North Khorasan Province, Iran
- Barzan, Charente-Maritime, a town in France
- Bârzan, a village in Lupșa Commune, Alba County, Romania
- Barzan Palace, a destroyed palace in Ha'il, Saudi Arabia
- Barzan souq, a market in Ha'il, Saudi Arabia

== Other uses ==
- Barzan Ibrahim al-Tikriti, executed Iraqi politician and half-brother of Saddam Hussein (1951–2007)
- Barzan (Star Trek), a humanoid species in the Star Trek universe (see "The Price")
- MV Barzan, the longest container ship in the world in 2015

== See also ==
- Tarzan
