= Mahmud Barzanji revolts =

1919–24 Kurdish revolts in Iraq

- Part of the Iraqi–Kurdish conflict
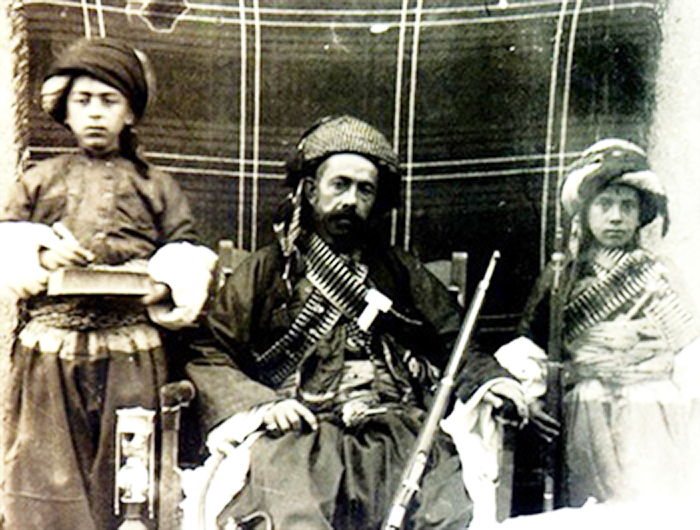
- Mahmud Barzanji as Kurdish warlord (prior to 1919)
Date	May–June 1919; November 1922 – July 1924; 1930
Location	Occupied Enemy Territory Administration and Mandatory Iraq
Result	Revolts suppressed: Kingdom of Kurdistan abolished in 1924; Sheykh Mahmud retreats to underground; Iraqi Kurdistan merged into Mandatory Iraq (1926); Sheykh Mahmud calls for another uprising in the spring of 1931 that caused him to once again get defeated and get put into house arrest
Territorial changes	Kingdom of Kurdistan reconquered by the British

Belligerents
Mandatory Iraq (United Kingdom) RAF Iraq Command; Iraq Levies (1924)	Kurdish state: Barzinja tenantry and tribesmen; Hamavand tribe; Sections of the Jaf, Jabbari, Sheykh Bizayni and Shuan tribes; Kingdom of Kurdistan: Kurdish National Army

Commanders and leaders
(Iraq) Faisal I	Mahmud Barzanji (surrendered)

Strength
(United Kingdom) Two British brigades	500

The Mahmud Barzanji revolts were a series of armed uprisings by Kurdish Sheykh Mahmud Barzanji against the Iraqi authority in newly conquered British Mesopotamia and later the British Mandate in Iraq. Following his first insurrection in May 1919, Sheykh Mahmud was imprisoned and eventually exiled to India for a year. When returning, he was once again appointed a governor, but shortly revolted again declaring himself as the ruler of the Kingdom of Kurdistan. The Kingdom of Kurdistan lasted from September 1922 – July 1924. With British forces greatly exceeding his in ammunition and training, the defeat finally subdued the region to central British Iraqi rule in 1924. Sheykh Mahmud retreated into mountains, and eventually reached terms with the independent Kingdom of Iraq in 1932, over his return from the underground. Sheykh Mahmud revolts are considered the first chapter of the modern Iraqi–Kurdish conflict.

== Background ==
Shortly after the final accords of World War I, the Sheykh of the Qadiriyya order of Sufis, the most influential personality in Iraqi Kurdistan, was appointed Governor of the former sanjak of Duhok.

== 1919 Kurdish revolt ==
On 23 May 1919, a few months after being appointed governor of Sulaymaniyah, Barzanji raised 300 tribal fighters, expelled British supervisors, and proclaimed himself "Ruler of all Kurdistan", initiating the first of the Mahmud Barzanji revolts. Early on in the rebellion, the Kurds saw some success with the ambushes on small British columns that strayed beyond Chamchamal. On both sides of the border, tribes proclaimed themselves for Sheikh Mahmud.

Using his authority as a religious leader, Sheikh Mahmud called for a jihad against the British in 1919 and thus acquired the support of many Kurds indifferent to the nationalist struggle. Although the intensity of the struggle was motivated by religion, Kurdish peasantry seized the idea of "national and political liberty for all" and strove for "an improvement in their social standing".

Tribal fighters from both Iran and Iraq quickly allied themselves with Sheikh Mahmud as he became more successful in opposing British rule. According to McDowall, the Sheikh's forces "were largely Barzinja tenantry and tribesmen, the Hamavand under Karim Fattah Beg, and disaffected sections of the Jaf, Jabbari, Sheykh Bizayni and Shuan tribes". The popularity and numbers of Sheikh Mahmud's troops increased steadily after their ambushes on British military columns.

Among the supporters of Sheikh Mahmud was also the 16-year-old Mustafa Barzani, who was to become the future leader of the Kurdish nationalist cause and a commander of the Peshmerga forces. Barzani and his men, following the orders of Barzani tribal Sheikh Ahmed Barzani, crossed the Piyaw Valley to join Sheikh Mahmud Barzanji. Even though they were ambushed several times on the way, Barzani and his men managed to reach Sheikh Mahmud's location, but were too late to provide serious help in the revolt. The Barzani's fighters were only a small part of the Sheikh's 500-people strong force.

As the British became aware of the Sheikh's growing political and military power, they were forced to respond militarily. Two brigades were sent out, which defeated the Kurdish force in the Bazyan Pass, which is close to the town of Barda Qaraman, on 18 June, and occupied Halabja on the 28th, ending the Kurdish state and defeating the rebellion.

== 1922 Kurdish revolt ==
After the Treaty of Sèvres, which settled some territories, Sulaymaniyah still remained under the direct control of the British High Commissioner. After the subsequent penetration of the Turkish "Özdemir" Detachment into the area, an attempt was made by the British to counter this by appointing Sheykh Mahmud, who was returned from his exile, as Governor once again, in September 1922.

The Sheykh revolted again and in November declared himself King of the Kingdom of Kurdistan. Members of his cabinet included:. The army of the Kingdom of Kurdistan was called the Kurdish National Army.

Barzanji was defeated in July 1924 when the British had sent out the Assyrian Levies who captured Sulaymaniyah. After the British government finally defeated Sheykh Mahmud, they signed Iraq over to King Faisal I and a new Arab-led government. In January 1926, the League of Nations gave the mandate over the territory to Mandatory Iraq, with the provision for special rights for Kurds.

== Aftermath ==
Following the defeat Sheykh Mahmud retreated into the mountains. In 1930–1931, Sheykh Mahmud Barzanji made his last unsuccessful attempt to gain power.

He later signed a peace accord with the new Iraqi government, returning from the underground to the independent Iraq in 1932.

== See also ==
- RAF Iraq Command
- List of modern conflicts in the Middle East

== Sources ==
- Eskander, Saad (1999). "Britain's Policy Towards The Kurdish Question, 1915-1923" (PDF). etheses.lse.ac.uk.
- Kilic, Ilhan (2018). Britain's Kurdish Policy and Kurdistan 1918 -1923 (PDF). School of History of the University of East Anglia.
- McDowall, David (1997). A Modern History of the Kurds. Bloomsbury Academic. ISBN 978-1-86064-185-5.
- McDowall, David (2007) [1996]. "The Kurds, Britain and Iraq". A Modern History of the Kurds (3rd ed.). I.B. Tauris. ISBN 978-1-85043-416-0.
- Lortz, Michael G. (2005). "Chapter 1: Introduction: The Kurdish Warrior Tradition and the Importance of the Peshmerga" (PDF). Willing to Face Death: A History of Kurdish Military Forces — the Peshmerga — from the Ottoman Empire to Present-Day Iraq (Thesis). Florida State University. p. 11. Archived from the original (PDF) on 29 October 2013.
