= Kurdish state (1918–1919) =

Autonomous government

- 1918–1919
- Flags (left: until May 1919, right: May–June 1919)

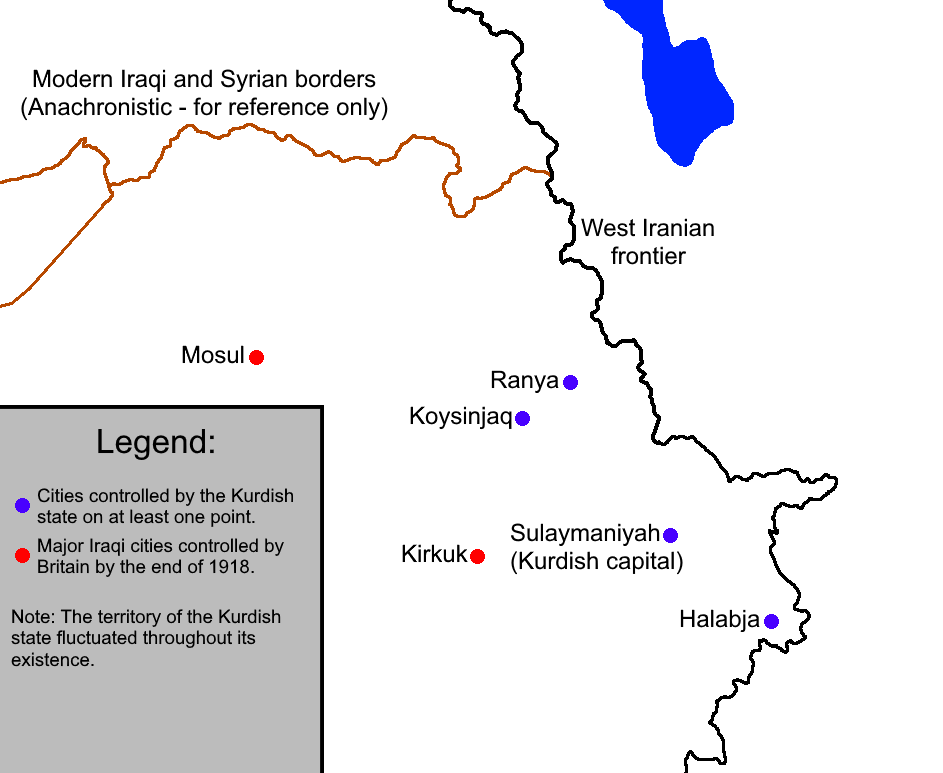
- Capital: Sulaymaniyah
- Official languages: Kurdish
- Demonym: Kurd
- hukumdar (governor), then "Ruler of all Kurdistan"
  - 1918-1919: Mahmud Barzanji
- Political officer
  - 1918-1919: Edward Noel
- History
  - Established: 25 October 1918
  - Barzanji designated as governor of Area B: 1 December 1918
  - Anti-British Rebellion: 23 May 1919
  - Disestablished: 28 June 1919
Preceded by	Succeeded by
Ottoman Empire	British Empire; Kingdom of Kurdistan
- Today part of: Kurdistan Region, Iraq

The Kurdish state was an autonomous government in Southern Kurdistan that existed from October 1918 to June 1919. Though it was initially subordinate to Britain, it was eventually dissolved following an anti-British rebellion.

== Name ==
"Kurdish state" is an exonym that was used by British officials in London and the Middle East to describe this polity during its existence. Saad Eskander argues that this term is incorrect, as it was not fully independent.

== History ==
=== Establishment ===
With the collapse of the Ottoman Empire in October 1918, Mahmud Barzanji sought to break away from the Ottomans and to create an autonomous Kurdish region under British supervision. He was elected as the head of government by a council of Kurdish nobles in the Sulaimaniya region. As soon as the British captured Kirkuk (25 October 1918), Barzanji attacked and captured Ottoman troops, declaring the end of Ottoman rule and pledging allegiance to Britain. Other Kurdish regions followed suit, such as Ranya and Koy Sanjaq.

From the Ottomans' view the region was still de jure theirs. (Further information: Mosul Question) They did not recognize the Kurdish state. In contrast, British officials chose to accept cooperation with the Kurds, despite officially lacking a well-defined policy on southern Kurdistan, and also because they were not in a position either militarily or politically, to ignore the existence of Kurdish nationalistic sentiments at the time.

Mahmud Barzanji was designated by the British as governor of Area B, which extended from south of the Lesser Zab River to the old Ottoman-Persian frontier. Barzanji attempted to expand his influence outside the designated region, and used British subsidies to provide salaries for his soldiers and to assist in the recovery from the ravages of war. Barzanji hoped to consolidate his power base by buying the loyalty of chieftains. This led to deteriorating relations with the British, setting the stage for an eventual revolt.

=== May 1919 rebellion ===
On 23 May 1919, a few months after being appointed governor of Sulaymaniyah, Barzanji raised 300 tribal fighters, expelled British supervisors, and proclaimed himself "Ruler of all Kurdistan", initiating the first of the Mahmud Barzanji revolts. Early on in the rebellion, the Kurds saw some success with the ambushes on small British columns that strayed beyond Chamchamal. On both sides of the border, tribes proclaimed themselves for Sheikh Mahmud.

Using his authority as a religious leader, Sheikh Mahmud called for a jihad against the British in 1919 and thus acquired the support of many Kurds indifferent to the nationalist struggle. Although the intensity of the struggle was motivated by religion, Kurdish peasantry seized the idea of "national and political liberty for all" and strove for "an improvement in their social standing".

Tribal fighters from both Iran and Iraq quickly allied themselves with Sheikh Mahmud as he became more successful in opposing British rule. According to McDowall, the Sheikh's forces "were largely Barzinja tenantry and tribesmen, the Hamavand under Karim Fattah Beg, and disaffected sections of the Jaf, Jabbari, Sheykh Bizayni and Shuan tribes". The popularity and numbers of Sheikh Mahmud's troops increased steadily after their ambushes on British military columns.

Among the supporters of Sheikh Mahmud was also the 16-year-old Mustafa Barzani, who was to become the future leader of the Kurdish nationalist cause and a commander of the Peshmerga forces. Barzani and his men, following the orders of Barzani tribal Sheikh Ahmed Barzani, crossed the Piyaw Valley to join Sheikh Mahmud Barzanji. Even though they were ambushed several times on the way, Barzani and his men managed to reach Sheikh Mahmud's location, but were too late to provide serious help in the revolt. The Barzani's fighters were only a small part of the Sheikh's 500-people strong force.

As the British became aware of the Sheikh's growing political and military power, they were forced to respond militarily. Two brigades were sent out, which defeated the Kurdish force in the Bazyan Pass, which is close to the town of Barda Qaraman, on 18 June, and occupied Halabja on the 28th, ending the Kurdish state and defeating the rebellion.

== Government ==
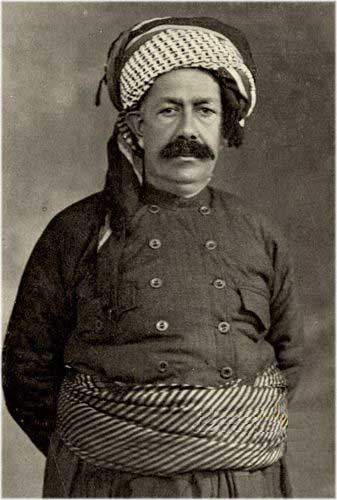
Mahmud Barzanji, head of government.

Mahmud Barzanji was the head of government when the Kurdish state was established. On 1 December 1918, British authorities recognized him as hukumdar (governor) of Sulaymaniya division.

British involvement was restricted to a role of supervision until the rebellion, and the local government retained autonomy in regards to matters relating to judiciary and revenue. Edward Noel was appointed by Arnold Wilson as the political officer responsible for supervision.

=== Language ===
The government gave Kurdish the status of being an official language.

=== Flag ===
This government used the flag of the United Kingdom until May 1919.

Ilhan Kilic states that the government "raised the Kurdish flag" upon rebellion on 23 May 1919, though he does not provide any details about its design. However, the authors of From Enemies to Allies: Turkey and Britain, 1918–1960 go in more detail about its design, stating "The flag designed in 1919 was green with a red circle and white crescent inside the circle." flaglog.com, an online index of flags, likewise corroborates that "Mahmud Barzanji revolted against the British under a green Kurdish flag. The revolt was suppressed in June but Barzanji would return in 1922 to declare an unrecognized Kingdom of Kurdistan under the same flag."

== See also ==
- Kingdom of Kurdistan - new attempt at a Kurdish state a few years later.
- Mahmud Barzanji revolts
