= David McDowall =

David McDowall may refer to:

- David McDowall (British Army officer) (1954–2025), British Army officer
- David McDowall (criminologist) (born 1949), American criminologist
- David McDowall (author) (born 1945), British author
- David McDowall-Grant (1761–1841), Scottish naval officer, collector of customs, and member of parliament

== See also ==
- David McDowell (1963–2014), American psychiatrist and author
- David McDowall Hannay (1853–1934), naval historian
