= Mawlid al-Barzanjī =

Verse written in praise of Muhammad

Calligraphy of the title adorning the cover of a recently released Arabic-English edition of Mawlid al-Barzanji in the United Kingdom.

Mawlid al-Barzanjī (Arabic: مَولِد الْبَرزَنجِي) is the widely known name of a verse written in praise of the Islamic prophet Muhammad by Kurdish Islamic jurist Jaʿfar b. Ḥasan al-Barzanjī. Its complete title is Iqd al-Jawhar fī Mawlid al-Nabiy al-Azhar (عقد الْجَوهر في مَولِد الْنَبِي الْأزهَر; The Jeweled Necklace of the Resplendent Prophet's Birth), and it was written in the Arabic vernacular.

The work has a central place during Mawlid, the annual commemoration of the birth of the Muhammad, which occurs on the 12th day of the Islamic month of Rabī al-Awwal in the Islamic calendar, a date recognized by most Sunni Muslims, however, some Twelver Shia Muslims observe it on the 17th of Rabi’ al-Awwal. In Muslim households of Asia and Africa, it is recited to solicit divine blessings on special occasions such as the birth of a child, moving into a new house, and the opening of a new business. It is also recited at death, under the belief that one should rejoice in God's blessing (i.e. the birth of Muhammad) rather than lament a loss (of a loved one). It also serves to remind the believer that no loss is greater than the loss of Muhammad.

== Scholarly commentaries ==
Scholars, such as the author's descendant, Ja’far ibn Ismā’īl al-Barzanjī (d. 1317 AH / 1899 CE) have composed commentaries on the work. Other prominent commentators include Muhammad ‘Ulaysh (d. 1299 AH/1881 CE), the Highest Juridical Authority (Muftī) of the Malikites in Egypt, and the Sundanese scholar, Muḥammad Nawawī al-Bantānī (d. 1316 AH/1898 CE), a Shāfi’ī jurist and sūfi who settled in Mecca. The titles of some of the commentaries are as follows:

- al-Barzanji, al-Kawkab al-anwār ‘alā ‘iqd al-jawhar fī mawlid al-nabī al-azhar;
- ‘Ulaysh, al-Qawl al-munjī ‘alā mawlid al-Barzanjī;
- al-Bantānī, Madārij al-ṣu‘ūd ilā iktisā’ al-burūd.

== Popular refrain ==
The work is the source of the popular refrain chanted in Mawlid gatherings around the globe:

عَطِّرِ ٱللّٰهُمَّ قَبْرَہُ ٱلْكَرِيمْ ، بِعَرْفٍ شَذِيٍّ مِنْ صَلاَةٍ وَتَسْلِيْم
ٱللّٰهُمَّ صَلِّ وَسَلِّمْ وَبَارِكْ عَلَيْهِ وَعَلَى آلِهِ

‘Aṭṭir Allāhumma qabrahu l-karīm / bi-‘arfin shadhiyyin min ṣalātin wa-taslīm
Allāhumma ṣalli wa-sallim wa-bārik alaihi wa-‘alā ālihi

O Allah, perfume his noble grave / with the fragrant scent of blessings and peace
O Allah, honor, bestow peace, and shower blessings upon him and his family

== Contents of Mawlid al-Barzanjī ==
The contents of the Mawlid al-Barzanjī in English are as follows:

1. The Prophet's Lineage
2. Before His Birth
3. Preternatural Occurrences
4. His Childhood
5. ʿAbd al-Muṭṭalib and Abū Ṭālib
6. Adulthood
7. His Marriage
8. Resolving a Dispute
9. The Beginning of Prophethood
10. The First Believers
11. The Year of Sadness
12. The Night Journey
13. The Prophet Presenting Himself to the Tribes
14. The Emigration
15. The Cave
16. Surāqa
17. The Story of Umm Maʿbad
18. Medina
19. His Inward and Outward Perfection and Beauty
20. The Seal of Prophethood
21. His Love for the Poor
22. Closing Supplication
