= Barzan, Iran =

Barzan برزان
- Village
- Location within Iran
- Coordinates: 33°29′47″N 49°08′05″E
- Country: Iran
- Province: Lorestan
- County: Dorud
- Bakhsh: Central
- Rural District: Heshmatabad

Population (2006)
  - Total: 360
- Time zone: UTC+3:30 (IRST)
  - Summer (DST): UTC+4:30 (IRDT)

Barzan (Persian: برزان, also Romanized as Barzān and Berzān) is a village in Heshmatabad Rural District, in the Central District of Dorud County, Lorestan Province, Iran. At the 2006 census, its population was 360, in 89 families.
