= Al-Barzanjī =

Kurdish Shafi'i Mufti of Medina (1716–1764)

Abd al-Karīm al-Barzanjī

Personal life
- Born: 1716
- Died: 1764 (aged 47–48)
- Notable work: Mawlid al-Barzanjī
- Known for: Shafi'i Mufti of Medina

Religious life
- Religion: Islam
- Denomination: Sunni
- Jurisprudence: Shafi'i
- Tariqa: Qadiri

Abd al-Karīm al-Barzanjī (1716–1764) was a Kurdish Sunni Shafi'i jurist who served as the Shafi'i Mufti of Medina. He hailed from the Shahrizor region and was from the Kurdish Barzanji tribe.

== Biography ==
Al-Barzanji was born around 1716 CE (~1128 AH) in Shahrizor, located in modern day Iraqi Kurdistan. In particular, he was born into the Barzanji tribe which has been historically known for its religious and intellectual leadership among the Kurds. Hailing from the Barzan region, the family became renowned for producing a long line of Sufi masters, scholars and jurists, particularly of the Shafi'i school and Qadiri sufi order.

His early education consisted of intensive exposure to the Islamic ulum (sciences) including Quranic studies, Hadith, and the basics of Shafi'i fiqh.

A turn in Al-Barzanji's life came when he departed Shahrizor for Medina al-Munawwara, one of the two holiest cities of Islam. Al-Barzanji dedicated himself to advanced Islamic studies upon his arrival in Medina. His studies consisted of the study of core texts (mutun), commentaries (shuruh) and supercommentaries (hawashi) of the Shafi'i school, studying under some of the most prominent scholars of the 18th century. During his studies he encountered scholars from the Hijaz, Egypt, the Levant and the Indian subcontinent.

The pinnacle of Al-Barzanji's career came with his appointment as the Shafi'i Mufti of Medina (a government position under the Ottoman administration), effectively becoming the chief legal interpreter for a significant portion of the city's populace.

== Sources ==
- R, Daniel (22 December 2025), "The Legacy of Abd al-Karīm al-Barzanjī: A Kurdish Sunni Jurist in Medina", Kurdish History
- Dehqan, Mustafa (2016). "A Gūrānī Mawlid". Jimar. 5.
