= Kingdom of Kurdistan =

Former unrecognized state in British-ruled Iraq

Coordinates: 35°33′N 45°25′E

Kingdom of Kurdistan Keyaniya Kurdistanê شانشینی کوردستان
- 1921–1924/1925
- Flag
- Status: Unrecognized state
- Capital: Sulaymaniyah
- Common languages: Kurdish
- Religion: Sunni Islam
- Government: Monarchy
  - Malik: Mahmud Barzanji
  - Prime Minister: Qadir Barzanji
- Historical era: Interwar period
  - Treaty of Sèvres: 10 August 1920
  - Proclaimed: September 1921
  - Treaty of Lausanne: 24 July 1923
  - Disestablished: July 1924/1925
  - British Mandate of Mesopotamia ends: 3 October 1932
- Currency: Kurdish notes
Preceded by	Succeeded by
Kurdish state (1918–1919)	Mandatory Iraq

The Kingdom of Kurdistan was a short-lived and self-proclaimed Kurdish state declared in the city of Sulaymaniyah following the collapse of the Ottoman Empire. It lasted from September 1921 until July 1925. Officially, the territory involved was under the jurisdiction of the British Mandate of Mesopotamia.

== Sheikh Mahmud revolts ==
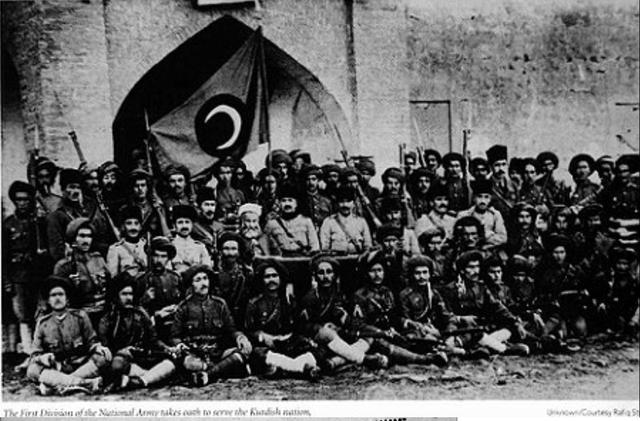
Mahmud Barzanji with his soldiers in Slemani

During the collapse of the Ottoman Empire, the Kurds attempted to establish an independent state.

Mahmud Barzanji, the Shaykh of the Qadiriyyah order of Sufis, the most influential personality in Southern Kurdistan, was appointed governor of the former sanjak of Duhok, but rallied against the British and declared an independent Kurdistan in May 1919. He was defeated in June.

On 10 October 1921, a statement was issued in Suleymanyah, the capital of Kurdistan, to establish a Kurdish government. Sheikh Mahmud Barzanji declared himself as the King of the Kingdom of Kurdistan.

After the Treaty of Sèvres, which settled some territories, Sulaymaniya still remained under the direct control of the British High Commissioner. After the subsequent penetration of the Turkish "Özdemir" Detachment into the area, an attempt was made by the British to counter this by appointing Shaykh Mahmud governor again, in September 1922. The Shaykh revolted again, and in November declared himself King of the Kingdom of Kurdistan. Members of his cabinet included:

- Shaikh Qadir Hafeed – Prime Minister
- Abdulkarim Alaka, a Christian Kurd – Finance Minister
- Ahmed Bagy Fatah Bag – Customs Minister
- Hajy Mala Saeed Karkukli – Justice Minister
- Hema Abdullah Agha – Labour Minister
- Mustafa Pasha Yamolki – Education Minister
- Shekh Mohammed Gharib – Interior Minister
- Zaky Sahibqran – Defence Minister of the Kurdish National Army

Barzanji was defeated when the British sent out an Assyrian force to capture Sulaymaniyah in July 1924, and in January 1926 the League of Nations gave the mandate over the territory back to Iraq, with the provision for special rights for Kurds. In 1930–1931, Shaykh Makhmud Barzanji made his last unsuccessful attempt.

The British Royal Air Force's Iraq Command acting on behalf of the Iraqi government in Baghdad played a part in bringing the Kingdom of Kurdistan to an end.

== See also ==
- List of Kurdish dynasties and countries
- Republic of Ararat
- Republic of Mahabad
- Kurdistan Regional Government
