= Kurds in World War II =

The history of the Kurdish people during the Second World War

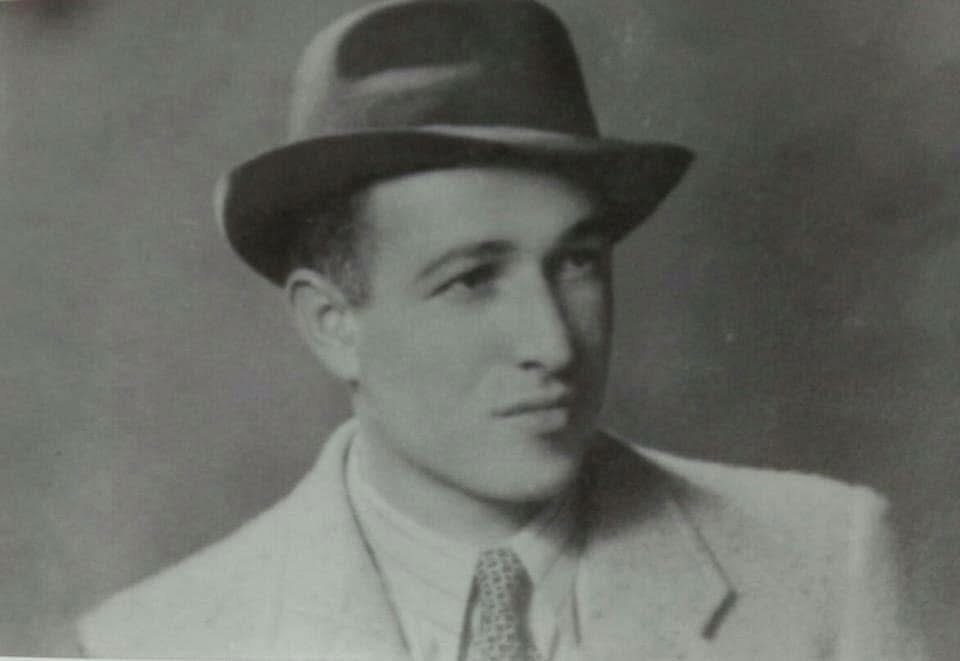
Ramzi Nafi is the most controversial Kurdish figure to come out of WW2

Kurds were involved in the political and military events of the Second World War in Europe, Asia and the Caucasus. Kurds participated on both the Axis and Allied powers. The Kurdish nationalist movement developed during the war and in the immediate post-war years.

== Kurds and Nazi Germany ==
=== Nazi Germany's perception of Kurds ===
On 22 January 1942, during a meeting with Heinrich Himmler, Hitler reportedly referred to Kurds as part of groups he considered “lost Germanics,” alongside Berbers of North Africa. Nazi racial theorist Hans F. K. Günther stated that Nordic blood was still common among Iranian Kurds, especially in certain neighborhoods.

In 1933, a law was passed that limited certain rights to those Germans classified as Aryans. Defining “Aryan” for the purposes of this law, Nazi official Albert Gorter wrote: “The Aryans are... divided into the western (European), that is the German, Roman, Greek, Slav, Lett, Celt [and] Albanesen, and the eastern (Asiatic) Aryans, that is the Indian and Persian, Afghan, Armenian, Georgian, Kurd.

=== Kurdish perception of Nazi Germany and Fascist Italy ===
There were Kurds who sympathized with the Nazis, seeing them as an anti-colonial alternative to the British or French.

The Kurdish nationalist Hîwa party, founded and led by Rafiq Hilmi in 1937, openly acknowledged its great paragons, Italian fascism under Mussolini and the German National Socialism under Hitler. Later, as the opinions and political views within the party became more polarized, the Hîwa Party eventually fragmented. It was divided into two factions: a radical pro-German wing and a more moderate, pro-British wing. Earlier in 1928, Süreyya Bedir Khan, a leader of Xoybûn, was reportedly invited to meet Benito Mussolini and stayed as his guest in Rome for fifteen days. When Bedir Khan left he believed that Mussolini was willing to offer support to the Kurds.

=== Military history ===
Insignia of the Caucasian-Mohammedan legion

The Caucasian-Mohammedan legion was a volunteer unit of the German army, it included Kurds alongside several other ethnic groups from the Caucasus and It was formed on 13 January 1942.

=== Operation Mammoth ===
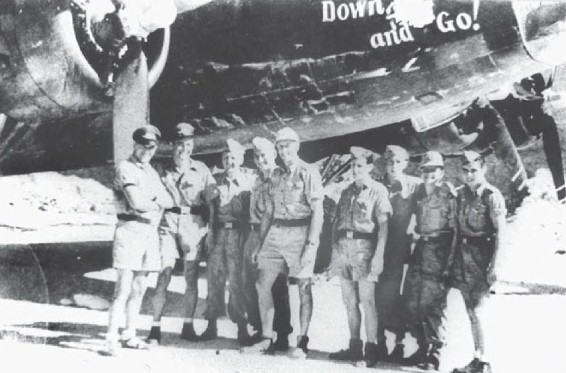
Crew members of the German Kampfgeschwader 200 whom took part in Operation Mammoth

In late 1942, the German Abwehr began planning a sabotage mission in Iraqi Kurdistan, led by Gottfried Johannes Müller. The operation, initially codenamed “Said Schahswar” and later renamed “Mammut,” was developed between December 1942 and January 1943 and approved by senior German command, including Wilhelm Keitel. During February and March 1943, Kurdish and Iraqi individuals were evaluated as potential agents, and Ramzi Nafi Rashid Agha was identified as a possible collaborator. In March 1943, German authorities arranged his entry into Germany, and he travelled via Sofia and Vienna, arriving at a training facility in Bodental (Slovenia) in April. Between May and June 1943, he underwent training in sabotage and intelligence work and agreed to take part in the mission. The operation officially departed Berlin in mid-June 1943 and travelled via Crimea toward Kurdistan. On 17 June 1943, the group was dropped by parachute near Mosul, but the drop went off target and supplies were largely lost. The operatives moved toward Erbil and the Turkish border, hiding in mountains and caves while attempting to make contact with locals. Ramzi moved between Erbil and their hideout gathering intelligence and seeking assistance, but by late June 1943 the German operatives were captured by Iraqi authorities, and Ramzi later surrendered in Erbil following the arrest of his relatives.

== Kurds and the Soviet Union ==
In 1939, 387 Kurds lived in the Russian SFSR, the same year the war began. Kurds all across the Soviet Union like other repressed nationalities in the USSR fought in the ranks of the Red Army and the pro-Soviet partisans in Ukraine against Nazi Germany. They also took part in the occupation of northern Iran in 1941. On 1 October 1941, the Kurdish soldier Samand Siabandov was awarded the title Hero of the Soviet Union. During the Battle of Sevastopol, the Kurdish sniper Akhmedov from Azerbaijan killed 17 German soldiers in ten days, while another Kurdish sniper from Azerbaijan, Navrozov, killed 80 enemy soldiers during 1942. Kurdish officers including Nadirov, Jafarov, and Chatoev took part in the defence of Leningrad, and Kurds from Armenia and Azerbaijan fought at the Battle of Stalingrad. Soviet Kurds such as Karasev, received both the Hero of the Soviet Union and the Partisan of the Fatherland War medal for organising guerrilla forces in Volhynia. Soviet Kurds later participated in the Soviet advance into Hungary and in the Soviet–Japanese War in Manchuria in 1945. Even Soviet Marshal Ivan Baghramyan praised the patriotic attitude of the Kurds.

=== Persecution of Kurds ===
Some Kurds had their internal Soviet passports altered to list them as Azeri. Those who retained Kurdish as their nationality suffered discrimination.

The participation in the defense of the USSR against Nazi Germany by Soviet Kurds, did not save the Kurds of Meskheti and Adzharia from the forced Resettlement as special settlers in Central Asia. The NKVD sent thousands of Kurds from Georgia to Central Asia in November 1944 and from the Caucasus in 1937. This new wave of deportees totaled 8,694 people and was part of the much larger forced resettlement of Meskhetian Turks. Joseph Stalin displaced a majority of the Kurds of the Soviet Caucasus, relocating them in Central Asia, Kazakhstan, and Siberia. Many Kurds died during the deportations. Those who survived were settled in villages with less than 10 Kurdish families in any one village. Their right to migrate freely was severely restricted, and visits to relatives were allowed only after obtaining special permits. Oppression of the Yazidis, among other things, reached its peak in 1938. When evaluating the data, Yazidis can appear in the records as either Kurds or Yazidis (distinct). According to Junge et al, Yazidis were persecuted by the NKVD almost ten times more often than Georgians. In 1926, 10,397 people were registered as Kurds in Georgia, of whom 2,301 (22%) were Yazidis, the remainder (78%) being Kurdish Sunnis.

== Legacy ==
=== Hawpa ===
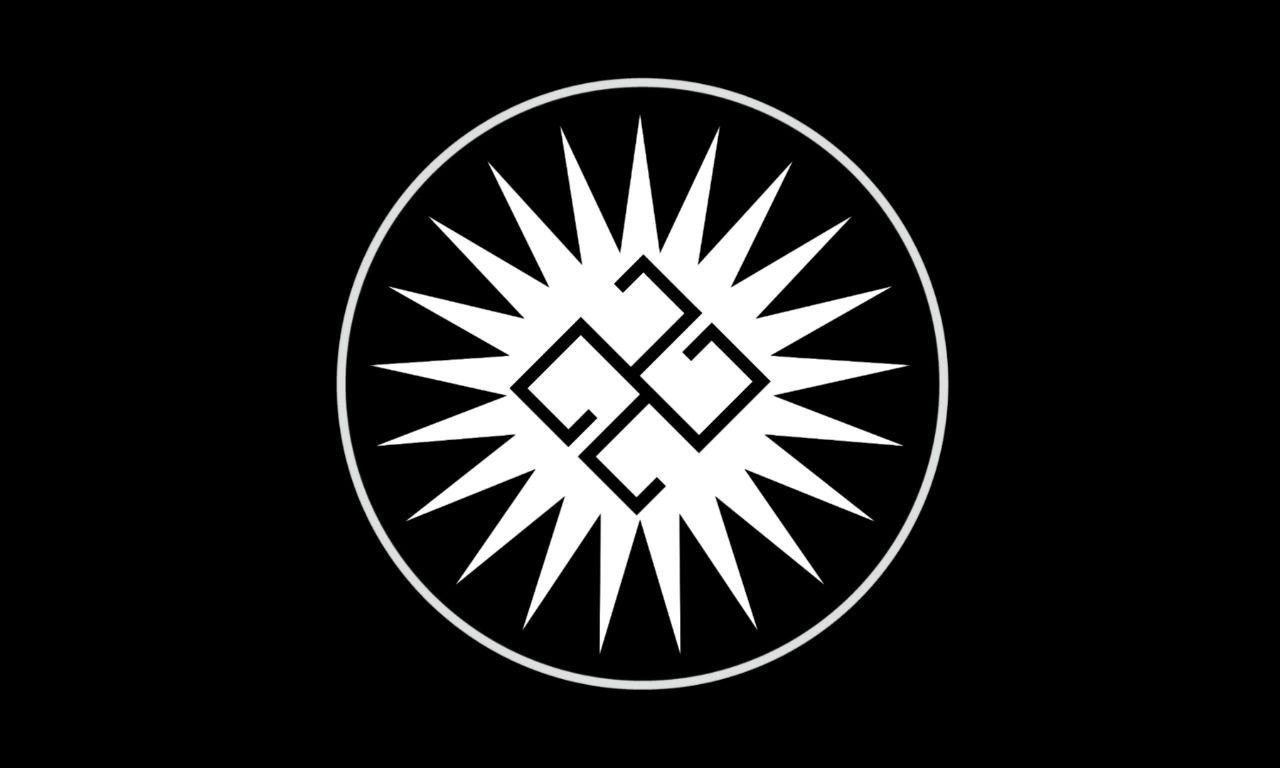
Flag of Hawpa

The Kurdish Neo-Nazi organization Hawpa, is heavily inspired by Ramzi Nafi, it has adopted 1943 as its founding date, the year that coincides with Operation Mammoth. Their flag has a white Kurdish Sun on a black background with a swastika inside it, similar to the flag of Nazi Germany. In 2023 the group was present at Nowruz celebrations in Istanbul, where they made headlines in Turkish media for performing the Nazi salute.

=== Denial of Kurdish involvement ===
In 2019 president Donald Trump announced that the US will be pulling its troops out of the Kurdish parts of Syria, and made a bizarre claim for defending his choice; “the Kurds didn't help us in the Second World War, they didn't help us with Normandy.” Kurdistan is roughly 4,000 kilometers (2,500 miles) from Normandy, France. Several Kurdish families have come forward with photographs of their fathers and grandfathers proving they were on America’s side in World War Two. Nevertheless, Kurds did help the British, US, and Allied efforts in Normandy, albeit obliquely. Kurds played a key role in the British occupation of Iraq during the Second World War, fighting alongside British troops to block a pro-Nazi coup.

== Notable people ==
- Ramzi Nafi
- Samand Siabandov
- Rafiq Hilmi
- Bakir Mustafayev

== See also ==
- World War II
- Kurds in Kazakhstan
- Kurds in Georgia
- Deportations of Kurds from Transcaucasia
