= Gertrude (code name) =

Invasion plan for Turkey by Germany

Operation Gertrude (planned)
- Part of World War II
- Rough reconstruction of the proposed partition of Turkey after Operation Gertrude, according to Abramian and Perinçek
Date	1942
Location	Turkey

Belligerents
(Nazi Germany) Germany (Kingdom of Italy) Italy; Axis Greece (Tsardom of Bulgaria (1908–1946)) Bulgaria; Armenian Legion; Georgian Legion; Kurdish nationalists	Turkey

Commanders and leaders
(Nazi Germany) Adolf Hitler (Kingdom of Italy) Benito Mussolini; Georgios Tsolakoglou (Tsardom of Bulgaria (1908–1946)) Boris III of Bulgaria; Drastamat Kanayan; Shalva Maglakelidze; Ramzi Nafi	(Turkey) İsmet İnönü (Turkey) Fevzi Çakmak (Turkey) Fahrettin Altay

Gertrude or Gertrud was the code name of the joint plan for the invasion of Turkey by Germany, Italy, Bulgaria and Axis-controlled Greece, alongside Armenian and Georgian legions and Kurdish separatists.

Gertrude was prepared during Case Blue, in the summer of 1942, and was scheduled to begin in late 1942; it would be completed in five weeks, as Turkey was to be thoroughly encircled. Turkey would then be divided between the forces involved.

The project was abandoned because of the rapid advance of the Red Army in the Caucasus region, the Allied invasion of Sicily and Erwin Rommel's loss in the Second Battle of El Alamein.
