= Hawpa =

Dissolved Iraqi Kurdish Neo-Nazi political party

Hawpa ڕێکخراوی هاوپایی نەتەوەیی کوردستان Organîzasyonî Hawpayî Neteweyî Kurdistan
- Leader: Sarhoz Rabaty
- Founded: 20 March 2020
- Dissolved: February 2026
- Headquarters: Erbil, Kurdistan Region
- Ideology: Kurdish nationalism Anti-Arabism; Anti-Iranian sentiment Anti-Turkish sentiment Anti-Assyrian sentiment Antisemitism; Irredentism; Neo-Nazism
- Political position: Far-right
- Colors: Black White
- Slogan: "Kurdistan for Kurds" (Sorani Kurdish: "کوردستان بۆ کورد")

Party flag
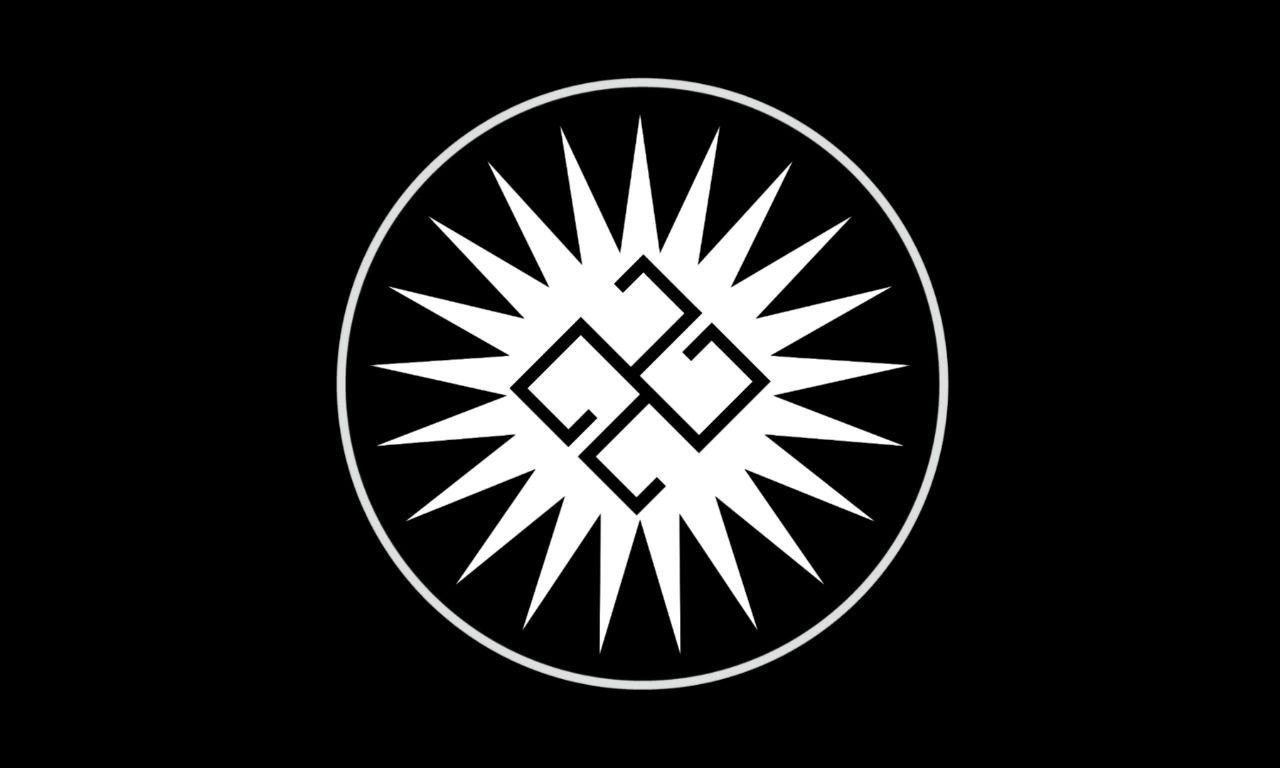

Website
- Archived 2025-01-14 at the Wayback Machine

Hawpa (Kurdish: ھاوپا, romanized: Hāwpa), (Note: lit. 'accomplice or person of same type'), also known as the Kurdish National Socialist organization (PSNK),) was a Kurdish neo-Nazi organization based in the Kurdistan Region of northern Iraq. The party was established during Nowruz in 2020 and is headquartered in Erbil. In 2023 Hawpa legally registered in the Kurdish government, however in February 2026 the head of Human Rights Commission of the Kurdistan Region announced the dissolution of Hawpa. The dissolution came after legal action was taken against it.

Hawpa has undertaken a campaign promoting their belief that Arabs should be expelled from the Kurdistan Region, and also advocating for a genocide of Turkmens and Assyrians. The group has previously been criticized by Assyrian organizations for spreading hatred against ethnic minorities in Iraq fueling intimidation campaigns and land grabbing.

== Etymology ==
In Sorani Kurdish, the word "Hawpa" translates to "accomplice".

== History ==
Hawpa was first established on the first day of Nowruz in 2020. In 2023, Hawpa was officially registered by the Government of the Kurdistan Region; the group had no legal recognition prior. The group has also met with high-profile figures in the Kurdish Regional Government such as Omed Khoshnaw, the governor of Erbil. In the same year, the group was present at Nowruz celebrations in Istanbul, where they made headlines for performing the Nazi salute.

On June 12, 2025, the Assyrian Federation in Germany (ZAVD) and the Assyrian Youth Federation of Central Europe (AJM) issued a joint appeal condemning Hawpa. The organizations urged the EU and international actors to condemn Hawpa and engage Kurdish authorities on the matter. In the same month, the group posted a video on social media calling for the extermination of Assyrians. In September, a Telegram group linked to the organization, "Kurdish Youth", called for violence against Christian places of worship on the grounds of being "meeting places of the Nestorians" and being anti-Kurdish.

The group has also communicated and met with "Kurden Nasyonalist", another far-right Kurdish organization.

In 2026, Mona Yaqo, head of the Independent Human Rights Commission in Erbil, announced the initiation of legal proceedings against the organization in January of this year due to its incitement activities. On 9 February, she announced the revoking of the groups legal status after it was proven to have deviated from the civil framework and transformed into an extremist ideological platform.

== Ideology ==
Hawpa's ideology belongs to the Third Position and strives for the establishment of a corporatist state under Kurdish unity. It has its origins in the Hiwa Party (1939–1946) of Rafiq Hilmi and the Kajik Party (1959–1975), both of which were founded on the basis of fascist and Nazi ideas.

Hawpa is openly anti-government and is against most political parties in the Kurdistan Region. Part of the group's stated ideology, “Hawpaism” seeks to eliminate the backward post-1946 Kurdish nationalism of the KDP and PUK. “Hawpaism” rejects the modern intellectualism of the Kurdish Populace, since the ideology holds that today's intellectuals in Kurdistan are nihilists and leftists. Much of the group's ideology is inspired by Ramzi Nafi, an Iraqi Kurd who led Operation Mammoth in 1943 in collaboration with two German Army officers. The group has previously listed their year of founding as 1943, the year when Nafi led Operation Mammoth.

The group primarily reaches an audience through the use of propaganda on social media. Through its platforms, the group has promoted the belief that Arabs should be expelled from the Kurdistan Region, while Turkmens and Assyrians should be subject to genocide. In particular, the group has previously posted offensive material against Assyrians, including denial of Assyrian continuity and mislabeling the community as Nestorians, as well as calling for the disbandment of Assyrian political parties and preventing cultural celebrations. The group has also been criticized for falsifying Assyrian history.

=== Symbolism ===
The party's flag consists of a black banner with a white circle in the middle; inside of the white circle is the Kurdish Sun with a Swastika in the middle. The party has claimed to reject the belief of Neo-Nazism, stating that the swastika in its flag is based on an ancient Kurdish symbol, that the Nazi salute is a Kurdish greeting, and that posts of Nazism and Adolf Hitler are aimed at clearing misconceptions of its ideology.

== See also ==
- List of neo-Nazi organizations
- Anti-Arabism in Kurdistan
