= Ramzi Nafi =

Kurdish nationalist (1917–1949)

Remzî Nafî ڕەمزی نافیع
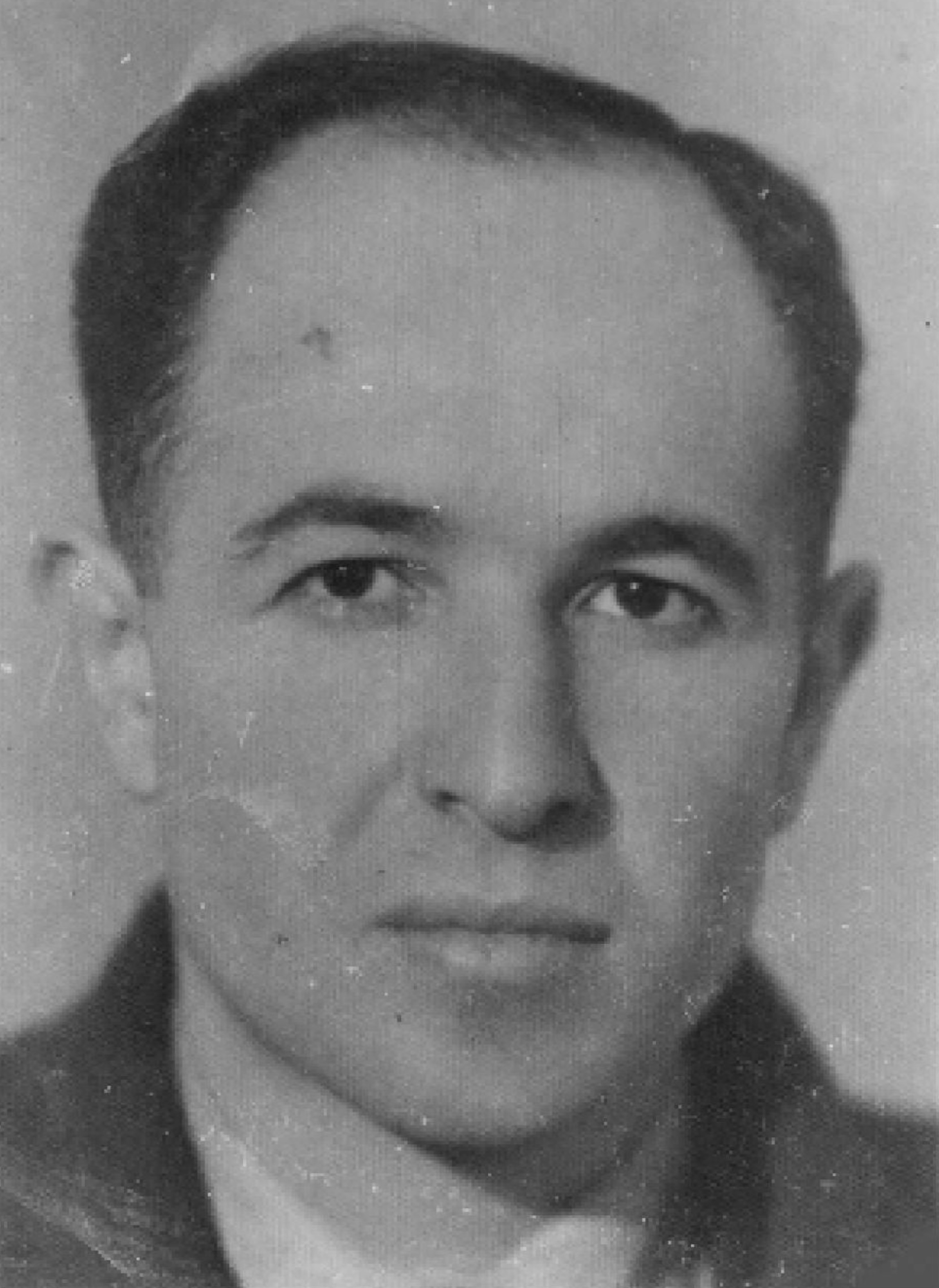
- Portrait of Ramzi

Personal details
- Born: 1917 Erbil, Ottoman Empire
- Died: 1949 (aged 31–32) Erbil, Kingdom of Iraq
- Citizenship: Nazi Germany (Note: 24 Mar 1943, German authorities arrange Ramzi’s entry into Germany a passport along side other things were prepared for him.)
- Party: Hîwa; Xoybûn
- Education: American University of Beirut

Military service
- Allegiance: (Nazi Germany) Abwehr (1942-1943)
- Battles/wars: World War 2; Operation Mammoth

Ramzi Nafi (Note: Full name: Ramzi Nafi Rashid Agha (Kurdish: ڕەمزی نافیع ڕەشید ئاغا, romanized: Remzî Nafî' Reşîd Axa)) (1917–1949) was a Kurdish nationalist who joined Nazi Germany’s military intelligence in 1942 for an unsuccessful operation aimed at overthrowing British governance in Iraq during World War II in 1943. In return the Germans, would establish an autonomous Kurdish state, under his leadership. There is ongoing debate regarding whether he followed National Socialist ideology or whether collaboration with the Nazi regime was purely opportunistic in the pursuit of Kurdish independence. Due to his pivotal role in the failed Operation Mammoth, Ramzi remains an extremely polarizing figure who is revered by some yet reviled by others in recent Kurdish history.

== Early life ==
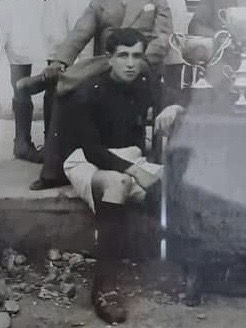
A young Ramzi Nafi posing with a football team in Kirkuk

Ramzi was born in 1917 to a prominent family from Erbil. He attended primary school and secondary school in Erbil. At the time, there were no high schools in Erbil, so as a result he went to a high school in Kirkuk for a year. In Kirkuk, Ramzi joined the far-right Hîwa party led by Rafiq Hilmi.

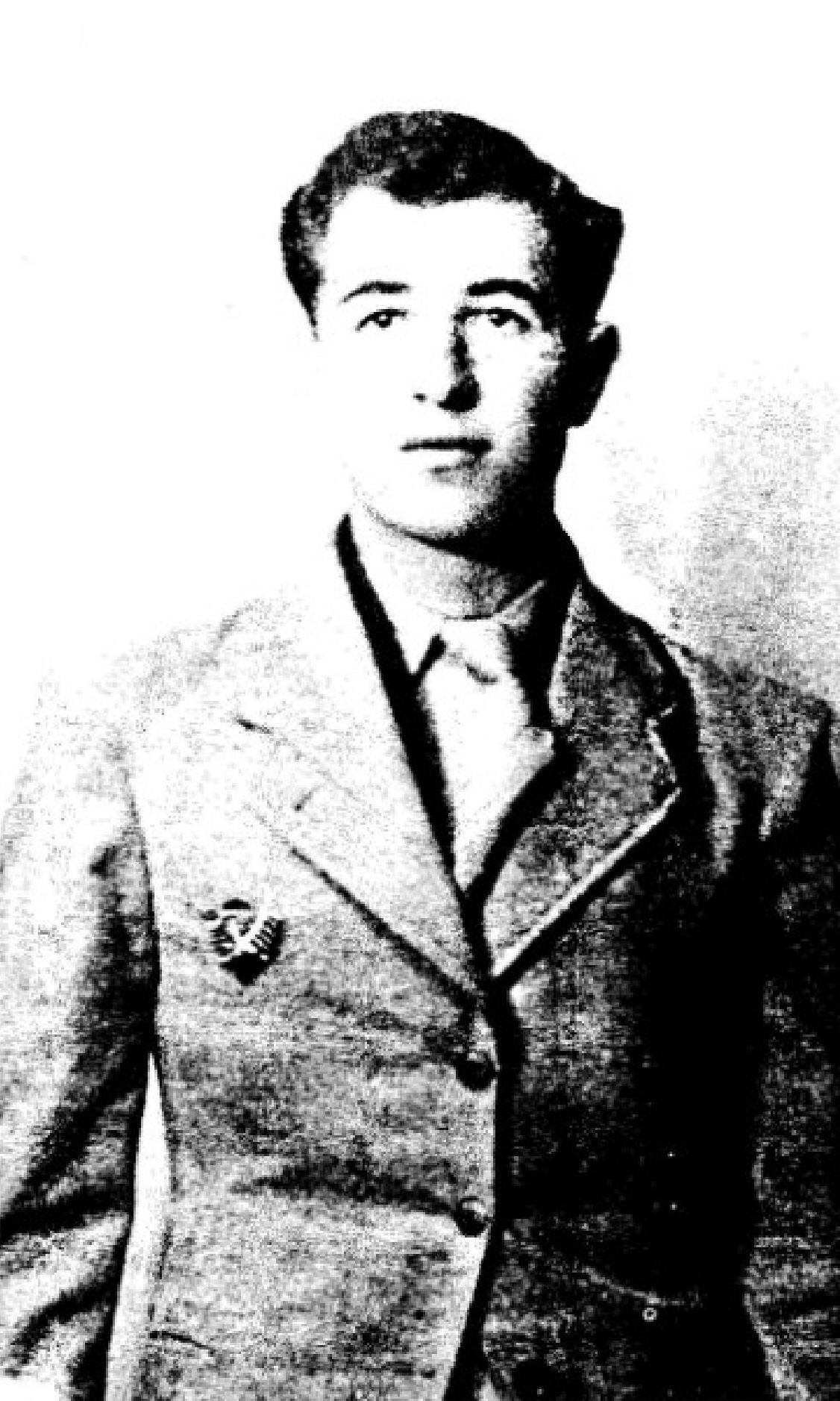
Ramzi Nafi in c. 1937-1938, during his university years

Ramzi then attended a science-oriented high school in Baghdad in the years of 1937 and 1938. He passed the bachelor's degree exam in Baghdad, and in 1939 decided to leave for Beirut. He attends the American University of Beirut for two years and achieved the rank of freshman. He was known for his opposition to the British Empire putting Kurdish lands within Iraqi borders. In Beirut, he met with Kamuran Alî Bedirxan, Nûredin Zaza, and some active figures in the Kurdish nationalist Xoybûn party at that time, which he joined and strived for an independent Kurdish state.

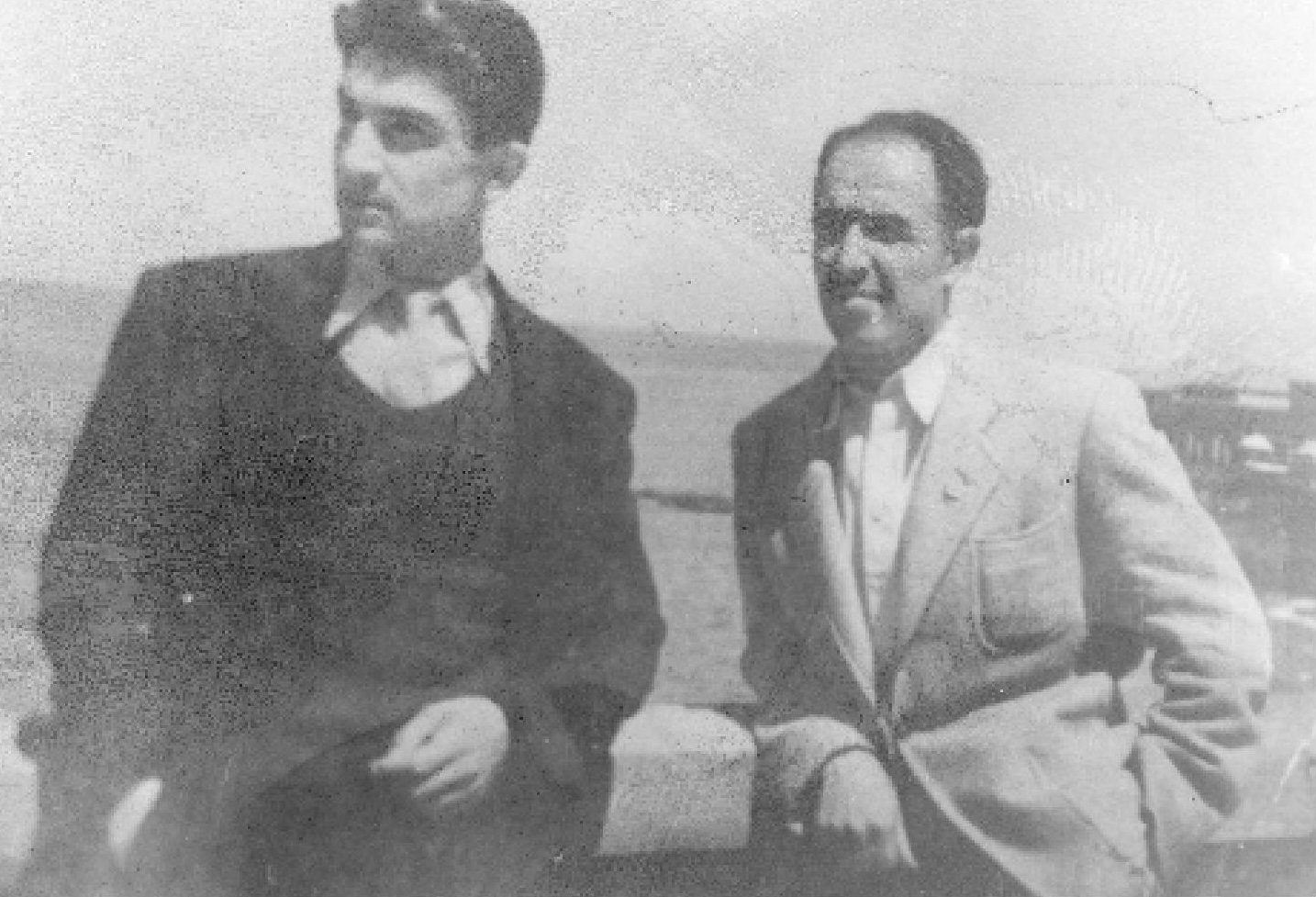
Nuredin Zaza and Ramzi Nafi by a sea coast

He remained in Beirut from October 1941 to March 1942. Later, he went to Istanbul to complete his education and was accepted in the private Robert College. It was in Istanbul in mid-1942 where he was contacted by the Abwehr and Major Gottfried Müller's men for Operation Mammoth.

A 1943 British archival document relating to Operation Mammoth states that the Germans paid Ramzi Nafi 20 Reichmarks daily. They offered him a reward of 30,000 Reichmarks for his assistance. Ramzi reportedly refused to accept the money and instead requested that the entire amount be donated to poor Kurdish students. Regarding his daily pay, he decided to donate the remaining balance he didn't use to the Red Cross.

== Operation Mammoth ==
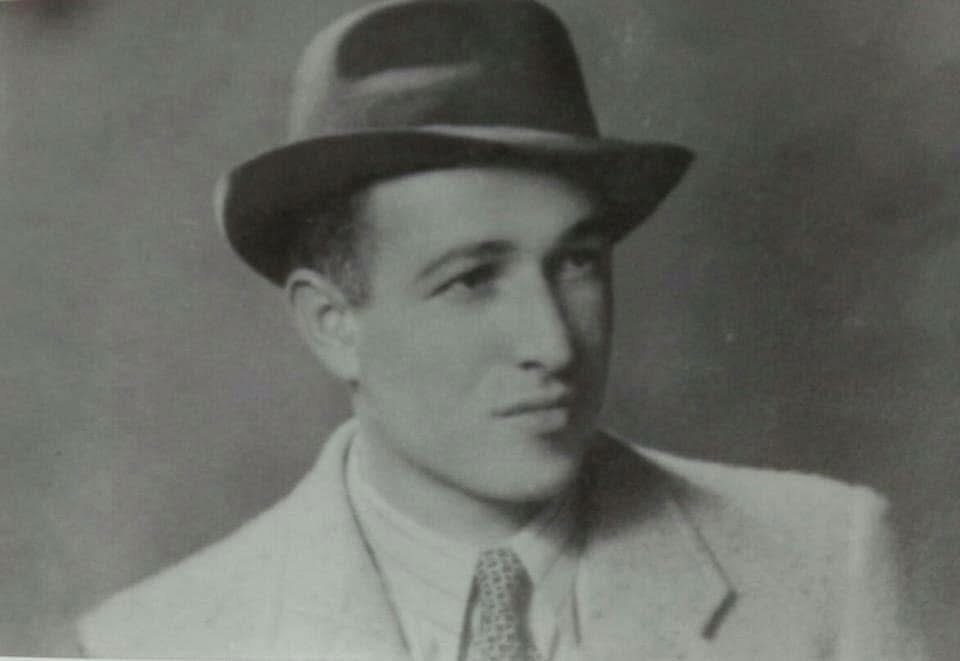

Operation Mammoth was a German special forces mission in 1943 during World War II, led by Major Müller and accompanied by Ramzi, to incite a rebellion of Iraqi Kurds in an attempt to expel the British from the region, gain control of the oil fields, and somehow deliver them to the Wehrmacht because Operation Barbarossa was not progressing as it was expected in reaching the Caucasus. In return for ejecting the British, the Kurds would be assisted by the Nazis in creating an independent Kurdistan. Major Müller, the mastermind of the operation, needed "a native Kurd who would be prepared to jump with us, lead us to a good hiding place and then make contact for us with Sheikh Mahmud and other Kurdish chieftains." Shortly after his arrival in Istanbul in 1942, Ramzi was contacted by several members of the Sicherheitsdienst unit and Müller's men to discuss the possibility of creating a roadmap-like plan for Kurdish unification in exchange for Kurdish uprisings against the British occupying the Kirkuk oil fields.

=== Failure ===
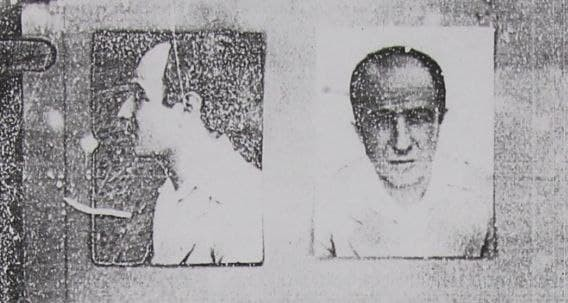
Ramzi Nafi after his arrest

The mission failed on the first day. The weapon and equipment cases were lost in the parachute drop and the group landed 300 km from the intended target. Ramzi and the Germans operatives were taken prisoners by British and Iraqi forces, tortured, and given the death sentence. Major Müller managed to escape and return to Germany, where he lived until his death on 26 September 2009.

The Kirkuk–Haifa oil pipeline, which delivered Iraqi oil to the Mediterranean coast since 1934 and to a refinery built near the city of Haifa in 1939, and which Time described on 21 April 1941 as the "jugular of the British Empire", as well as the Kirkuk-Tripoli pipeline branching off at Haditha, formed the backbone of the Western allies' warfare in the Mediterranean, and their loss would have had a decisive impact on the further course of the war.

== Aftermath and death ==
Following his arrest in June 1943, Ramzi Nafi was interrogated by Iraqi police, who prepared an interrogation report dated 4 July 1943. Nafi was imprisoned in Baghdad and approximately two years later, sentenced to death by hanging. his family worked intensively to have the death sentence commuted to imprisonment. His family paid the authorities a large sum of money and, also threatened the presiding judge with violence even before the verdict was delivered. The judge, Mustafa Ragib, subsequently resigned from the trial. Through further "connections," the family eventually secured a longer prison sentence (20 years) for Ramzi. He was released in 1946 on grounds of mental and emotional incapacity. He died two years later in 1949 in his hometown Erbil in Iraqi Kurdistan.

== In popular culture ==
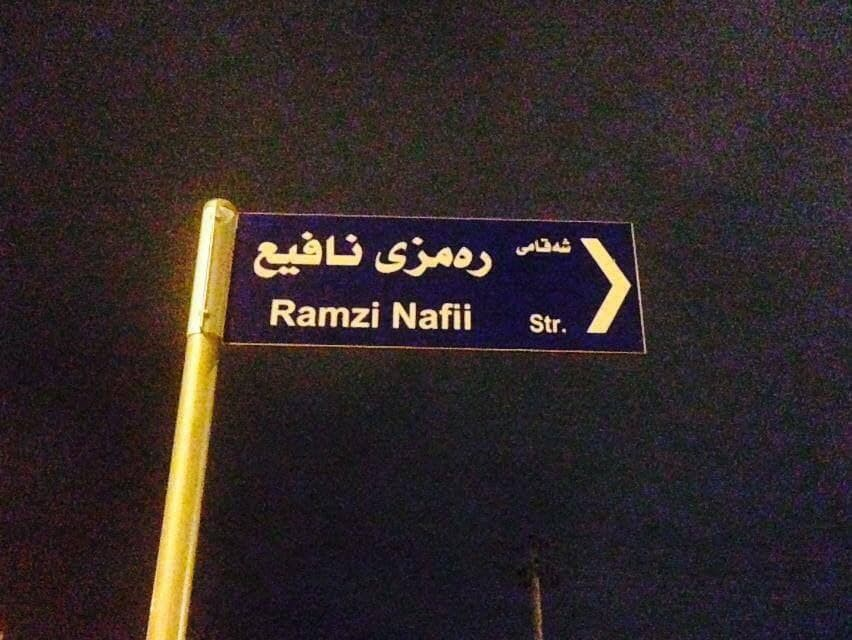
Ramzi Nafi street in Erbil

The Kurdish Neo-Nazi organization Hawpa, is heavily inspired by Ramzi Nafi, it has adopted 1943 as its founding date, the year that coincides with Operation Mammoth. Their flag has a white Kurdish Sun on a black background with a swastika inside it.

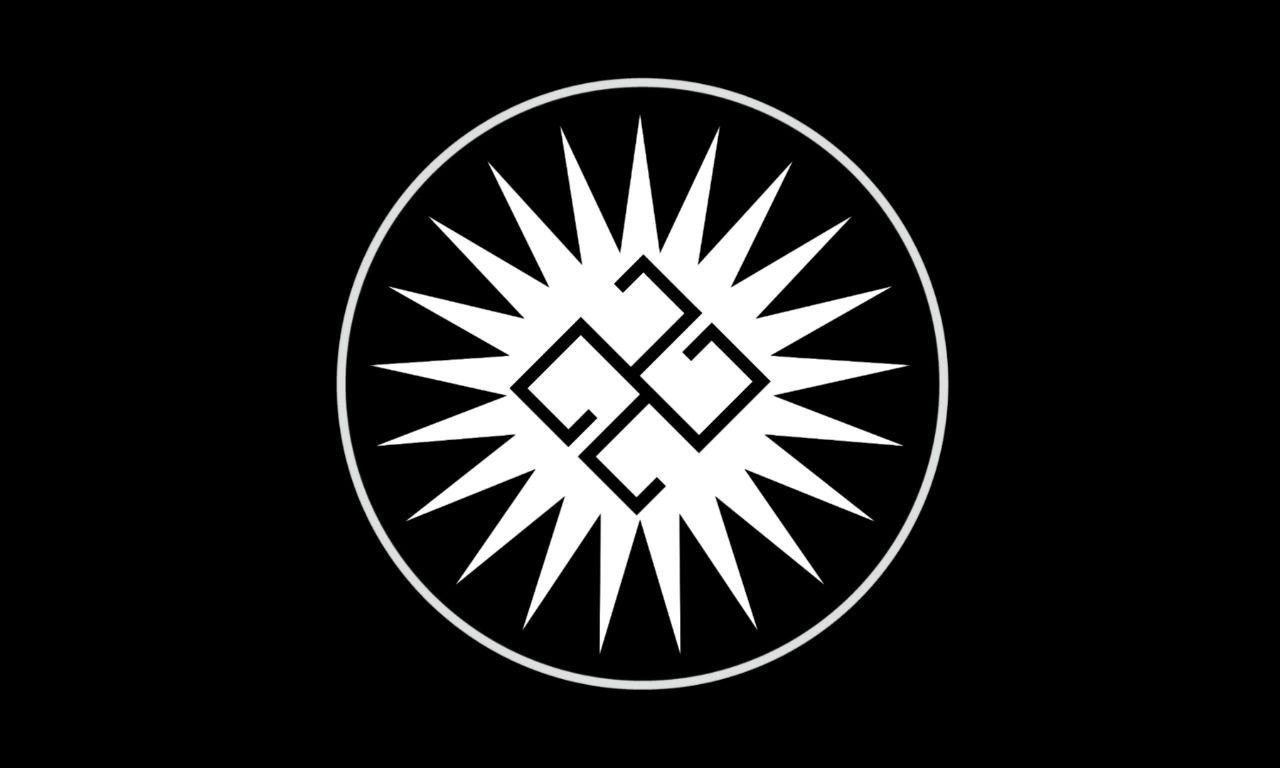
Flag of Hawpa

=== Biographies ===
- Ramzi Nafi', der große Märtyrer, den die Stadt Hawler opferte. Mas'ud Mohamad 1985.

=== Operation Mammoth ===
- Werner Brockdorff: Geheimkommandos des Zweiten Weltkrieges. Wels 1967, ISBN 3-88102-059-4.
- Ulrich van der Heyden, Bernd Lemke, Pherset Rosbeiani: Unternehmen Mammut: Ein Kommandoeinsatz der Wehrmacht in Nordirak 1943. Edition Falkenberg, ISBN 3-95494-145-7.

== See also ==
- Kurds in World War II
- Celadet Alî Bedirxan
- Kamuran Alî Bedirxan
- Mehmet Şükrü Sekban
- Rafiq Hilmi
