= Operation Mammoth =

Kurdish-Nazi Germany operation against Britain

- Part of World War II in Kurdistan
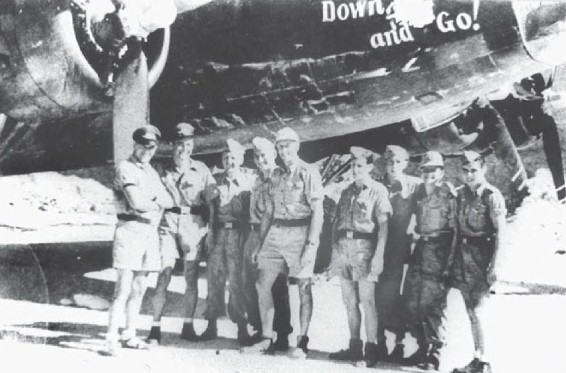
- Crew members of Kampfgeschwader 200 who took part in Operation Mammoth
| Date | 15–29 June 1943 |
| Location | Iraqi Kurdistan |
| Result | Operation failure |

Belligerents
| (Nazi Germany) Germany; Kurds | United Kingdom (Mandatory Iraq) Kingdom of Iraq |

Commanders and leaders
| (Nazi Germany) Gottfried Müller (POW) (Kurds) Ramzi Nafi (surrendered) | Unknown |

Units involved
| Abwehr; Kampfgeschwader 200 | MI6; Iraqi Police |

Casualties and losses
| Supplies for the planned rebellion largely lost | None |

Operation Mammoth ("Unternehmen Mammut"), was a German special forces mission in 1943 by the Wehrmacht, during World War II, for a team of two German Army officers, led by Gottfried Müller and accompanied by a Kurdish activist Ramzi Nafi Agha, to start a rebellion of the Iraqi Kurds in an attempt to expel the British from the region, gain control of the oil fields, and in some way deliver them to the Wehrmacht because Operation Barbarossa was not progressing as it was expected in reaching the Caucasus. In return for ejecting the British, the Kurds would supposedly be assisted in creating an independent Kurdistan.

The mission failed. Ramzi and the German operatives were taken prisoners by British and Iraqi forces, tortured and sentenced to death. Müller managed to escape and return to Germany where he later founded Salem International. Ramzi had his sentence reduced to life, however he became mentally disturbed in prison and consequently was released in 1947. He died two years later in 1949 in his hometown Erbil in Iraqi Kurdistan.

== Timeline ==
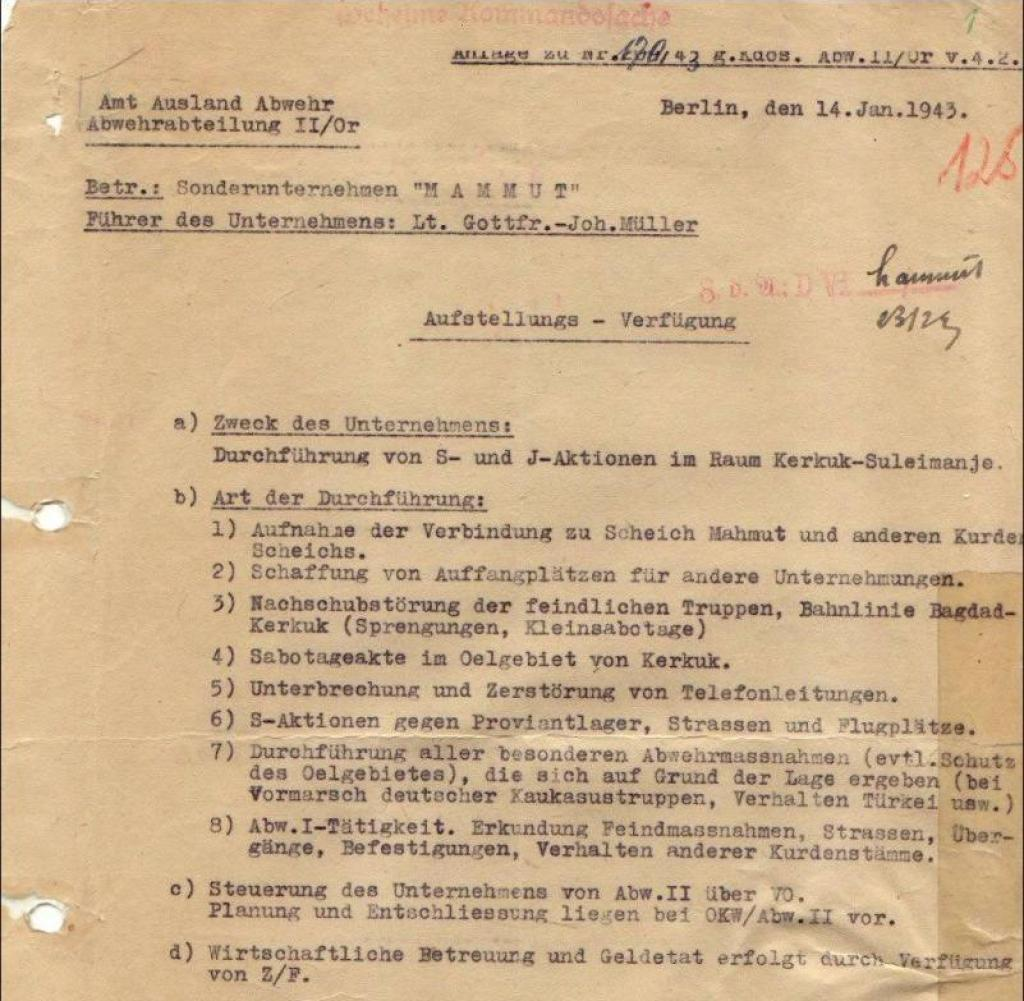
Official operation document.

The full timeline from 1942-1943:

| Time | Event |
|---|---|
| 21 Oct 1942 | Initial discussion within the Abwehr about a sabotage mission in Iraqi Kurdistan, led by Gottfried Johannes Müller. |
| Dec 1942 – Jan 1943 | Operation plan developed (initial codename “Said Schahswar”, later “Mammut”); approved by German high command including Wilhelm Keitel. |
| Feb – Mar 1943 | Kurdish and Iraqi candidates evaluated as possible agents; Ramzi Nafi Rashid Agha identified as a potential collaborator. |
| 24 Mar 1943 | German authorities arrange Ramzi’s entry into Germany (passport, visa, and travel route prepared). |
| 19 – 28 Apr 1943 | Ramzi travels via Sofia and Vienna to Germany; arrives at training facility in Bodental (Slovenia). |
| May – Jun 1943 | Intensive training in sabotage and intelligence operations; Ramzi formally agrees to participate in the mission. |
| 14 Jun 1943 | Official departure ceremony in Berlin. |
| 15 – 16 Jun 1943 | “Mammut I” unit departs Berlin, travels via Crimea toward Kurdistan. |
| 17 Jun 1943 | Parachute drop near Mosul (off target); supplies largely lost; group begins moving toward Erbil and the Turkish border. |
| 18 – 23 Jun 1943 | They hide in mountains and caves near Erbil while attempting to contact locals. |
| 24 – 27 Jun 1943 | Ramzi moves between Erbil and the hideout gathering intelligence and attempting to secure assistance. |
| 28 Jun 1943 | German operatives captured by Iraqi authorities near their hiding area. |
| 29 Jun 1943 | Ramzi surrenders in Erbil after arrests of his relatives. |

== Aftermath ==
In 1947, all three German parachute agents including Gotfried Müller, were released from the British prisoner-of-war camp in Egypt and transported back to Germany via Port Said. Ramzi became mentally disturbed in prison and was released in 1947. He died two years later in 1949 in his hometown Erbil in Iraqi Kurdistan.

== In popular culture ==
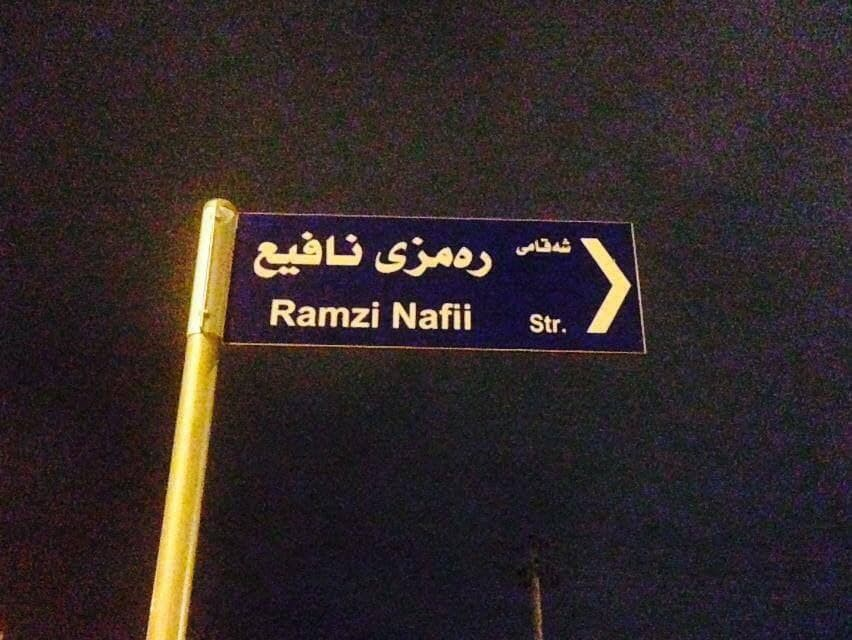
Ramzi Nafi street in Erbil

The Kurdish Neo-Nazi organization Hawpa, is heavily inspired by Ramzi Nafi, it has adopted 1943 as its founding date, the year that coincides with Operation Mammoth. Their flag has a white Kurdish Sun on a black background with a swastika inside it.

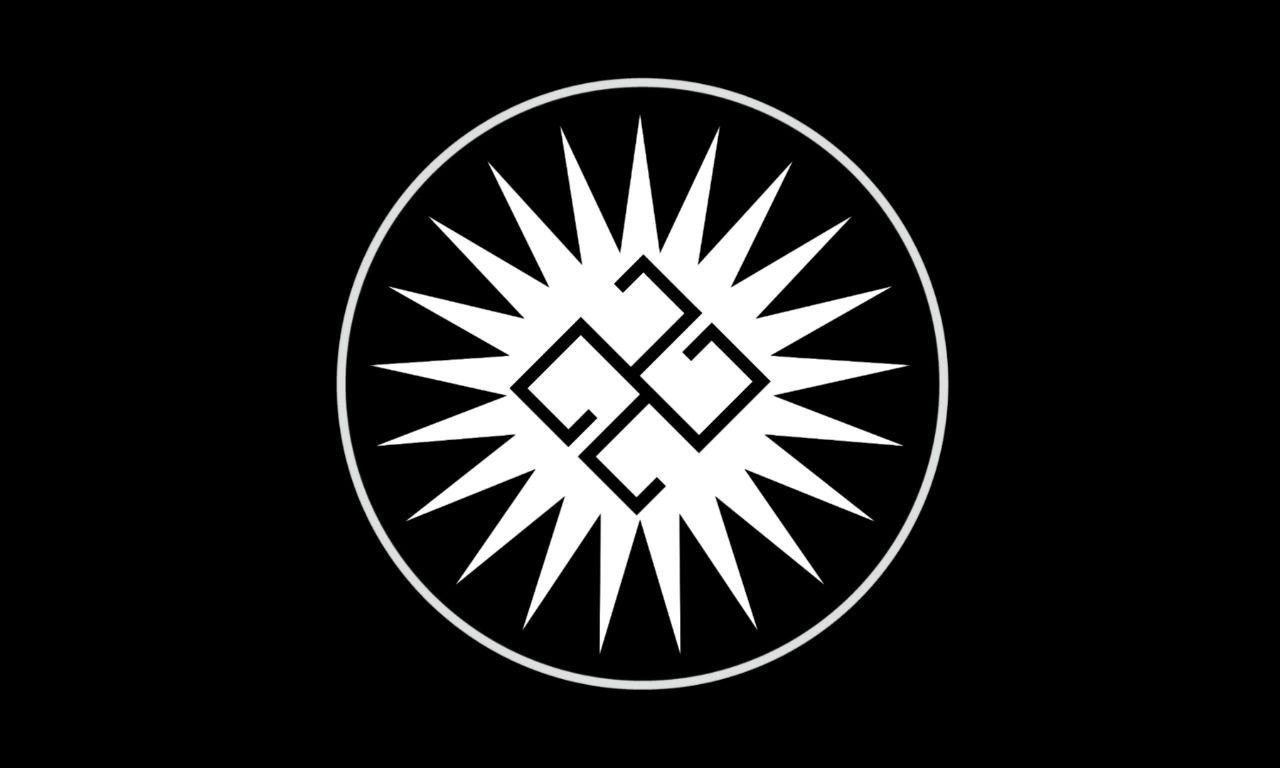
Flag of Hawpa

== Literature ==
- Werner Brockdorff: Geheimkommandos des Zweiten Weltkrieges. Wels 1967, ISBN 3-88102-059-4.
- Ulrich van der Heyden, Bernd Lemke, Pherset Rosbeiani: Unternehmen Mammut: Ein Kommandoeinsatz der Wehrmacht in Nordirak 1943. Edition Falkenberg, ISBN 3-95494-145-7.
- Operation Mammut, A Wehrmacht commando operation in the Kurdistan region of Iraq 1943, archive.org
- Dissertation of the topic (available as PDF)
- „Die Brandenburger“ Kommandotruppe und Frontverband. Bundesarchiv

== See also ==
- Kurds in World War II
- Mediterranean and Middle East theatre of World War II

== Sources ==
- Bernd Lemke / Pherset Rosbeiani (ed.), Operation Mammut, A Wehrmacht commando operation in the Kurdistan Region of Iraq in 1943 (2026), archive.org.
- Müller, Gottfried Johannes, In the Burning Orient, 3rd ed., Salem-Buchdienst GmbH, Stadtsteinach, 2007.
