= Samand Siabandov =

Soviet politician and writer (1909–1989)

Samand Aliyevich Siabandov
- Siabandov in the 1940s
- Born: 20 November 1909; Asandzhan, Kars Oblast, Russian Empire
- Died: 14 November 1989 (aged 79); Yerevan, Armenian SSR; Soviet Union
- Military career
- Allegiance: Soviet Union
- Branch: Red Army
- Service years: 1941–1945
- Rank: Lieutenant-colonel (podpolkovnik)
- Unit: 755th Rifle Regiment
- Conflicts: World War II; Battle of Moscow; Defense of Tula; Operation Bagration; East Prussian offensive; Baltic Sea campaigns (1939–1945)
- Awards: Hero of the Soviet Union
- Other work: Deputy of the Supreme Soviet of the Soviet Union; Deputy of the Supreme Soviet of the Armenian SSR; Deputy Minister of Agriculture of the Armenian SSR

Samand Aliyevich Siabandov (Russian: Саманд Алиевич Сиабандов, Kurdish: Semendê Elî Siyabendov; 20 November 1909 – 14 November 1989) was a Soviet writer, military commander and politician of Yazidi Kurdish origin. He was awarded the title Hero of the Soviet Union during the Soviet war against Nazi Germany.

== Career ==
Siabandov joined the Communist Party of the Soviet Union in 1931 and in 1938 was elected deputy in the Supreme Soviet of the Armenian Soviet Socialist Republic. Later he was a Minister of Agriculture for the Armenian SSR. After World War II he was elected to the Supreme Soviet of the Soviet Union.

He joined the Red Army in June 1941. During the war, he initially served in several command and political positions. He fought on the Western, Bryansk, 1st, 2nd and 3rd Belarusian Fronts and was wounded twice. In 1941, he took part in the battles on the Desna near Zhukovka, the defense of Tula, the counter offensive near Moscow, and the liberation of Shchekino, Yasnaya Polyana and Vysokovsk. In 1942–43, he took part in the liberation of Yukhnov and the battles on the Zhizdra River. In 1943, he participated in the liberation of Bryansk, Pochep, Unecha and Gomel, the crossings of the Desna, Sozh and Dnieper rivers, and the Rechitsa–Zhlobin operation. In 1944, he took part in the Belarusian operation, including the liberation of Bobruisk, Osipovichi and Baranovichi, as well as operations in Poland. He took part in the crossing of the Narew River. In 1945, he participated in the East Prussian operation, including the liberation of Allenstein (Olsztyn), and in battles to reach the Baltic Sea in the Frisches Haff area. On 7 September 1944, during fighting for a bridgehead on the left bank near Dzebendyz, Poland, he led the repulse of enemy counterattacks and took command of a combined group of troops.

On 1 October 1941, Siabandov was awarded the title Hero of the Soviet Union.

He was the author of two published poems in the Kurdish language and an Armenian-Kurdish dictionary.

In a postwar account written by G. Kolmanov approximately two decades after the Second World War, Siabandov was described as a highly decorated lieutenant colonel of the Soviet Army living in Yerevan. Kolmanov noted that Siabandov was widely recognized among local residents, who greeted him in public, and that he wore multiple high Soviet military decorations, including the Hero of the Soviet Union award. In the same account, Siabandov told Kolmanov that he had been “one of the first Kurd boys parents had consented to their attending school.”

== Honours and awards ==
- Hero of the Soviet Union (24 March 1945)
- Order of Lenin (24 March 1945)
- Two Order of the Red Banner (1 August 1943 and 27 July 1944)
- Three Order of the Patriotic War (1st class - 19 February 1945 and 6 April 1985; 2nd class - 30 November 43)
- Order of the Red Star (9 July 1942)
- Two Order of the Badge of Honour
- Medal For Courage (22 January 1942)

== Published works ==
- Siyabend û Xecê (Siyabend and Xecê) in Kurdish - (1959)
- Jiyana Bextewar (The happy life) in Kurdish - (1966)
- Ferhenga Ermenî-Kurdî (Armenian-Kurdish dictionary) - (1959)

== See also ==
- Kurds in World War II
