= Maryland Salem Children's Trust =

Christian 501(c)(3) organization

The Maryland Salem Children's Trust Inc. was a Christian 501(c)(3) organization, member of Salem International, founded in 1979 by Louise Sutermeister and located in Frostburg and dedicated to children who "have experienced repeated trauma at a young age". Dr. Terry J. Russell, Chair of the Social Work Department at Frostburg State University was the unpaid President of the organization from 2009 to 2014. According to the organisations own website, it ceased operations in 2020.
