= Bakir Mustafayev =

Azerbaijani Red Army soldier (1898–1978)

Bakir Dursun oglu Mustafayev
- Bəkir Dursun oğlu Mustafayev
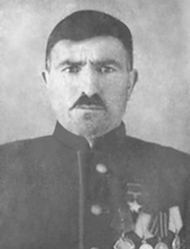
- Born: 11 February 1898; Glazar village, Akhaltsikhsky Uyezd, Tiflis Governorate, Russian Empire
- Died: 10 December 1978 (aged 80); Kaynama, Samarqand District, Samarqand Region, Uzbek SSR, Soviet Union
- Military career
- Allegiance: Soviet Union
- Branch: Red Army
- Service years: 1941–45
- Rank: Red Army Man
- Unit: 55th Guards Rifle Division
- Conflicts: World War II; Battle of the Caucasus; Kerch-Eltigen Operation; Crimean Offensive
- Awards: Hero of the Soviet Union

Bakir Dursun oglu Mustafayev (Azerbaijani: Bəkir Dursun oğlu Mustafayev, Kurdish: Bekir Mûstefayêv; 11 February 1898 – 10 December 1978) was a Kurdish-Azerbaijani soldier who served in the Red Army during World War II. Holding the rank of Red Army man he was decorated as a Hero of the Soviet Union. Mustafayev was awarded the title for his actions during the Kerch–Eltigen Operation. During the operation, Mustafayev reportedly killed 40 German soldiers. For his actions, Mustafayev was awarded the title Hero of the Soviet Union on 16 May 1944. He was discharged after the war and lived in Samarqand District.

== Early life and interwar years ==
Mustafayev was born on 11 February 1898 in the village of Glazar in what is now Akhaltsikhe Municipality to a peasant family. He worked in agriculture and was chairman of a collective farm.

== World War II ==
Mustafayev was drafted into the Red Army in August 1941. He fought in combat from March 1942, fighting in the Battle of the Caucasus. Mustafayev became a rifleman in the 5th Rifle Company of the 55th Guards Rifle Division's 164th Guards Rifle Regiment. In fall 1943, he participated in the Kerch-Eltigen Operation. He crossed the strait with the first group of the regiment. On 3 November, during the battle for Height 102 northeast of Kerch, heavy fire stopped the advance. Mustafayev crawled to a bunker on a height and threw grenades, reportedly killing five German soldiers. His unit then reportedly captured the height. In a battle in a trench, Mustafayev reportedly killed four more German soldiers, captured a machine gun and opened fire on German troops. Mustafayev reportedly hoisted a red flag on Height 102. He was wounded, but reportedly did not leave the battlefield. During the fighting on the Kerch Peninsula, Mustafayev reportedly killed 40 German soldiers. He was evacuated the next day. On 16 May 1944, he was awarded the title Hero of the Soviet Union and the Order of Lenin.

In 1944, Mustafayev joined the Communist Party of the Soviet Union. He fought in the Crimean Offensive.

== Postwar ==
After the end of the war, Mustafayev was discharged. He lived and worked in the village of Kaynama in Samarqand District. He died on 10 December 1978.

A street in Kaynama was named after Mustafayev. In April 2008, his Gold Star and other documents were sold in an online auction.

== See also ==
- Kurds in World War II
- Kurds in Azerbaijan
- Kurds in Russia
