= Defense of Tula =

World War II campaign in Russia

- Part of Battle of Moscow
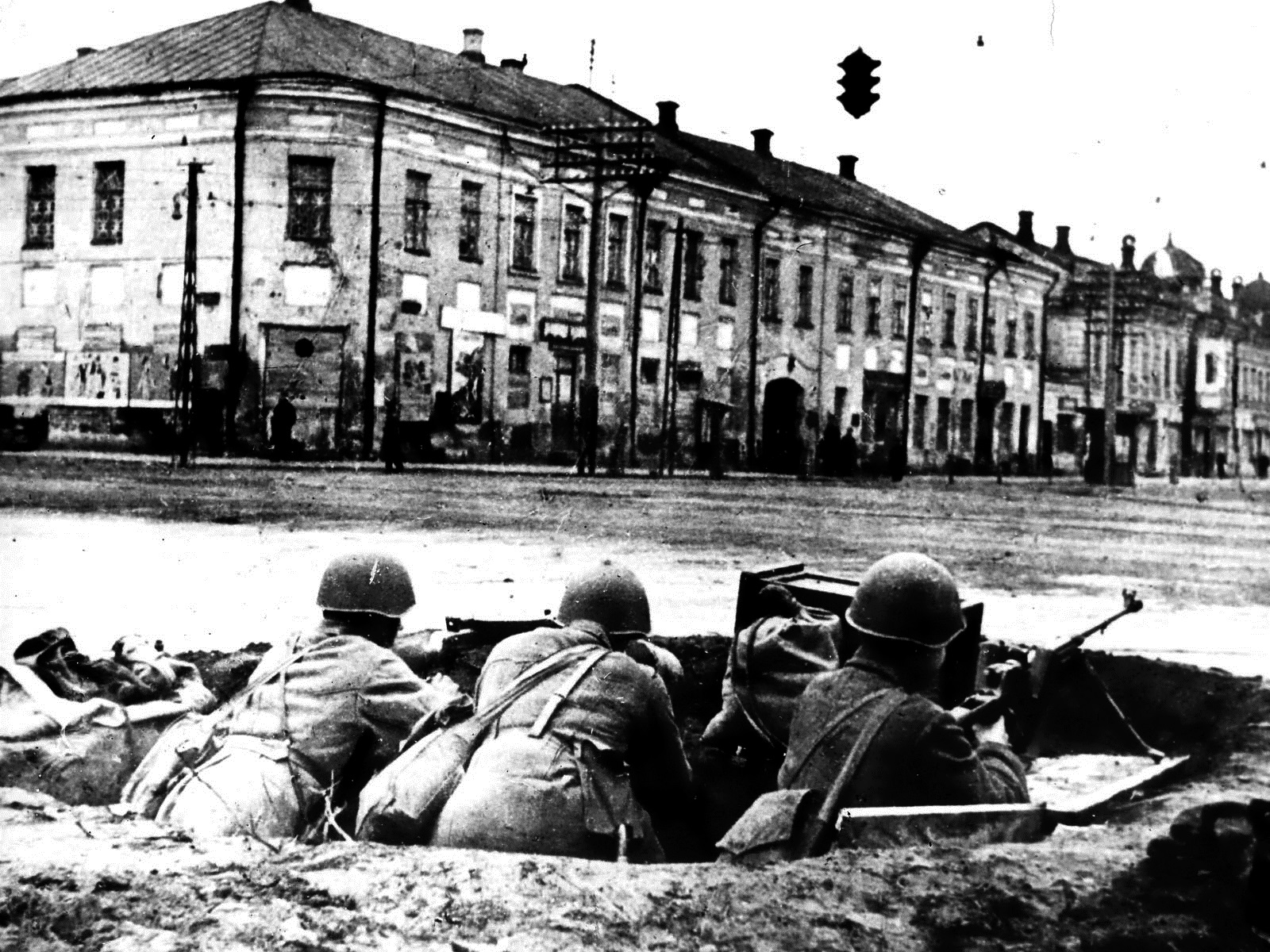
- Defenders of Tula preparing to fight
Date	24 October–5 December 1941
Location	Tula Oblast, Soviet Union
Result	Soviet victory

Belligerents
Germany	Soviet Union

Commanders and leaders
Heinz Guderian	Vasilii Stepanovich Popov; Samand Siabandov

Units involved
2nd Panzer Army	See Units section

Casualties and losses
1,500 killed 5 tanks 1 aircraft	Unknown

The Defense of Tula from 24 October to 5 December 1941 was a defensive operation part of the Battle of Moscow by the troops of the Bryansk Front. The operation played an important role in stabilizing the front line on the southern approaches to Moscow, depriving German units of the initiative and creating conditions for a Soviet counteroffensive.

== Background ==
The city of Tula under the Soviet Union was nicknamed “weapons capital of Russia”. Tula was an important center of armaments production for the Soviet Union and controlled the highway to Moscow, 184 km to the north. However, on 30 October its main strategic value was as an obstacle to General Guderian’s continued advance northward. Key objectives included the Tula Arms Plant and Klokovo airbase. By 30 October, Tula’s defenses had been reinforced. The headquarters of the reconstituted 260th Rifle Division, commanded by Colonel N. V. Revyakin, arrived in the city, while additional units of the 732nd Air Defense Regiment under Major M. T. Bondarenko took up positions. Major General Vasilii Stepanovich Popov was appointed commander of the Tula Defense Zone.

On October 22, by order of the State Defense Committee, the Tula City Defense Committee was formed (chairman - secretary of the regional party committee V.G. Zhavoronkov, N.I. Chmutov - chairman of the regional executive committee, V.N. Sukhodolsky - head of the regional department of the NKVD and Colonel A.K. Melnikov - commandant of the city). The city defense committee was entrusted with full responsibility for the defense of the city. On October 23, the city defense committee decided to form a Tula Workers' Regiment consisting of 1500 people from the destroyer battalions.

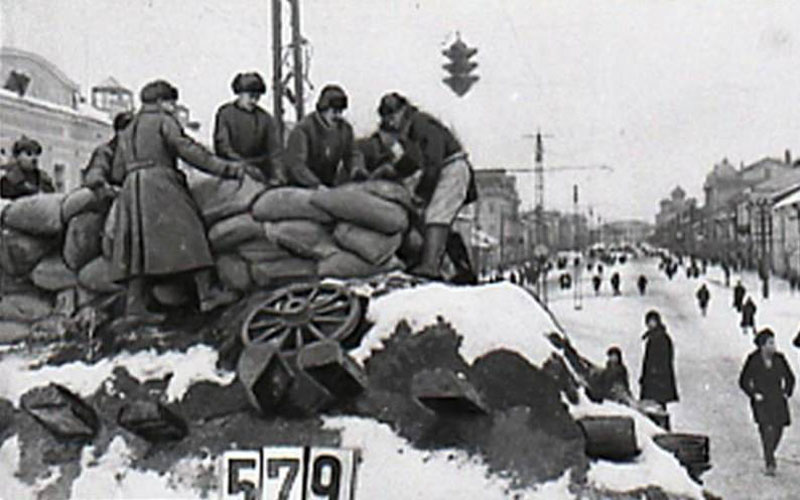
At Tula defense lines

== Units ==
To continue Operation Typhoon, the command of Army Group Center (Field Marshal Fyodor von Bock) involved the right-flank 2nd Panzer Army (Colonel General G. Guderian) and the 2nd Field Army (Colonel General M. von Weichs).

The Soviet troops opposing them included:

- 50th Army (Major General A. N. Yermakov, from November 22 - Lieutenant General I. V. Boldin)
  - 154th Rifle Division (Major General Y. S. Fokanov; 1200 people on October 16)
  - 217th Rifle Division (Colonel V. P. Shlegel; 1600 men on October 20)
  - 258th Rifle Division (Colonel M. A. Siyazov)
  - 260th Rifle Division (Colonel V. D. Khokhlov; 200 men on October 16)
  - 279th Rifle Division (Colonel P. G. Sheludko; 1500 people on October 16)
  - 290th Rifle Division (Colonel N. V. Ryakin; 1524 people on October 20)
  - 299th Rifle Division (Colonel I. F. Seregin; 400 men on October 16)
  - 413th Rifle Division (Major General A.D. Tereshkov)
  - 41st Cavalry Division (Brigade Commander P. M. Davydov)
  - 31st Cavalry Division (Colonel Y. N. Pivnev)
  - 11th Tank Brigade (Colonel P.M. Arman)
  - 32nd Tank Brigade (Colonel I.I. Yushchuk; 5 KV-1s, 7 T-34s, 22 T-60s, and a motorized infantry battalion of 960 men)
  - 108th Panzer Division (Colonel S. A. Ivanov; 3 KV-1s, 7 T-34s, 23 light tanks on October 16th)
  - 69th Brigade of the NKVD Troops for the Protection of Especially Important Industrial Enterprises (Colonel A. K. Melnikov)
    - 156th NKVD Regiment (Major S. F. Zubkov, Tula)
    - 180th Regiment of the NKVD (Stalinogorsk)
    - 115th Separate Battalion (Aleksin)
    - 34th Motorized Rifle Regiment of the NKVD troops (Lieutenant Colonel I. I. Piyashev; temporarily subordinated)
    - Tula Workers' Regiment (Major A. P. Gorshkov, Tula)
    - 732nd Anti-Aircraft Artillery Regiment of Air Defense (Lieutenant Colonel M. T. Bondarenko)
- 49th Army (Lieutenant General I. G. Zakharkin)
  - 2nd Cavalry Corps (Major General P. A. Belov)
  - 112th Tank Brigade (Colonel A.L. Getman)
  - 340th Rifle Division (Colonel S. S. Martirosyan; joined the army on December 1, 1941)
- 3rd Army (Major General J. G. Kreizer)
- garrison and militia units of Tula
  - Armored train No 13
  - Armored train No 16
  - 447th Artillery Regiment of the Reserve of the Main Command (Colonel A. A. Mavrin)
  - 702nd Anti-Tank Regiment (seven 37-mm guns)
- individual units and formations transferred from the rear or from other fronts:
  - 9th Tank Brigade (Lieutenant Colonel I. F. Kirichenko; 7 KV-1, 20 T-34, 28 T-40 on October 28, 1941)
  - 173rd Rifle Division (Colonel A.V. Bogdanov)
  - 129th Rifle Division (Colonel A.V. Gladkov)
  - 238th Rifle Division (Colonel G. P. Korotkov)
  - 239th Rifle Division (Colonel G.O. Martirosyan)
  - 34th Guards Rocket Artillery Battalion (Captain Frantsev)
  - 84th Naval Rifle Brigade (Colonel V.A. Molev) Partisans provided assistance to the Soviet troops: 31 partisan detachments and 73 sabotage groups operated in the rear in the Tula region in October

== Course of the Operation ==
On October 29, the 290th Rifle Division was sent to the defense line in the area of Yasnaya Polyana. On the night of October 30, during the offensive of German tanks, it left its positions and retreated to the Nizhnie Prisady station, 18 km northeast of Tula. At the same time as Kosa Gora, the 31st Cavalry Division withdrew, the new location of which was the area of the headquarters of the 50th Army (12 km northeast of Tula). Thus, Yasnaya Polyana, the metallurgical plant, the village of Kosaya Gora, Ivanovskiye Dachi, the village of Novo-Basovo were occupied by the enemy without resistance.

The fighting was fierce, but the attempt to seize the city immediately failed. According to Soviet data, on October 30, the defenders of Tula repulsed 4 tank attacks (20-50 tanks and from a company to a battalion of motorized infantry), on October 31 and on November 1, 2 more tank attacks, as well as numerous attacks on individual sectors of the front in groups of 3-5 tanks and up to a platoon of infantry. In three days of fighting, 38 tanks were knocked out and up to 500 enemy soldiers and officers were destroyed. The losses of the Soviet troops amounted to: 3 knocked out tanks, 3 guns, 4 heavy machine guns, 5 anti-tank rifles, 84 people killed and 212 wounded.

On November 10, the 43rd Army Corps launched an attack south of Aleksin in order to disrupt the communications of the 50th Army and force it to leave Tula. However, the defenders of Tula repelled this blow. Although by 3 December, German forces had captured the Serpukhov–Tula road and railway, cutting the communications of the 50th Army. However, this was the Wehrmacht’s last success near Moscow. German troops, lacking equipment necessary for combat in the harsh winter and facing fierce Red Army resistance, suffered heavy losses. On 4 December, the 340th Rifle Division and 112th Tank Division counterattacked the Germans flank, supported from the south by the defenders of Tula. The German advance was forced to halt, and on 5 December Guderian’s 2nd Panzer Army, dispersed along a 350 km front, was ordered to go on the defensive. The 43-day Tula Defensive Operation was completed.

== Casualties ==
During the two months of occupation of the districts of the Tula region, the Tula partisans destroyed about 1,500 German soldiers and officers, 15 tanks, one aircraft, 150 cars and 100 carts with ammunition, 45 motorcycles, six guns, one mortar battery, 18 kilometers of telephone cable. They derailed two military trains, captured three locomotives and 350 wagons, in which there were 130 cars, 70 motorcycles, a large number of machine guns, mines, ammunition and food. In particular, one of the nine partisans of the Heroes of the Soviet Union, awarded a high title in 1941, A. P. Chekalin, was part of a partisan detachment operating in the Tula region; E. I. Osipenko was also awarded the medal "Partisan of the Patriotic War" of the First Degree No 1.

== Legacy ==
For the heroic defense on the Eastern Front and the achievements in the development of the national economy, on December 3, 1966, Tula was awarded the Order of Lenin. On December 7, 1976, Tula was awarded the honorary title of "Hero City" with the award of the Gold Star.
