= Salem International =

Germany-based international non-denominational Christian non-profit welfare organisation

SALEM International gemeinnützige GmbH is a German charitable company with limited liability based in Stadtsteinach. It describes itself as an international non-denominational Christian non-profit welfare organisation. Its guiding principles include human rights, vegetarian diet, and the promotion of a non-denominational Christian way of life. Its slogan is "Christian, nonprofit, charitable".

== Name ==
The institution's name "SALEM" refers to Salem (Hebrew שָׁלֵם, Shalem, "peace"), the home of Melchizedek as given in Genesis 14:18, possibly to be identified with Jerusalem.

== History ==
SALEM International was founded by "Gottfried Müller and a circle of friends" in 1957 in Germany.

In Germany, SALEM established institutions for homeless people, children from disadvantaged family backgrounds, and ex-convicts in Stadtsteinach and Höchheim, Bavaria, and Kovahl, Lower Saxony.

In 1980, 200 children were living in the long-established villages in Germany. But Müller has said that "Salem is only the model"; he and other organizers have not been interested in increasing the number of the villages belonging to the organization, instead seeing them as models.

Further Salem institutions were built in Uganda, Russia, Togo, and Ecuador. Similar independent projects exist in the United States and Israel.

== See also ==
- Maryland Salem Children's Trust
