= Gottfried Müller (philanthropist) =

Gottfried Johannes Müller
- Gottfried Johannes Müller (left) alongside a Kurdish fighter
- Born: 10 April 1914; Gschwend, Swabia
- Died: 26 September 2009 (aged 95)
- Occupation: Philanthropist

Gottfried Johannes Müller (10 April 1914 – 26 September 2009) was a German philanthropist, who founded Salem International. During World War II, he served in the Wehrmacht and took part in Operation Mammoth, a failed attempt to expel the British from Iraqi Kurdistan.

== Life ==
Müller was born in the Swabian village of Gschwend. He travelled to Kurdistan in 1935–36, and wrote a book, "Breaking into Closed Kurdistan", which was published in 1937. After military service, he worked as a salesman and served in a cavalry regiment.

In World War II, Müller served in the Wehrmacht. He took part in Operation Mammoth, a failed attempt to start a rebellion of the Iraqi Kurds in an attempt to expel the British from Iraq. He wrote an account of the operation in his 1959 book "In the Burning Orient".

In 1957 he co-founded Salem International, a Christian vegetarian welfare organisation. They first created homeless shelters, and later children's homes.

Müller was married twice, first to Susanne Firgau. They had two sons, and divorced in the 1960s. In 1973 he married Ursula Schweizer; they had two sons. He died in 2009, aged 95.

== Books ==
- Breaking into Closed Kurdistan ("Einbruch ins verschlossene Kurdistan"), 1937. (Clean, non-free version)
- In the Burning Orient ("Im brennenden Orient"), 1959
