= Rafiq Hilmi =

Kurdish author and politician

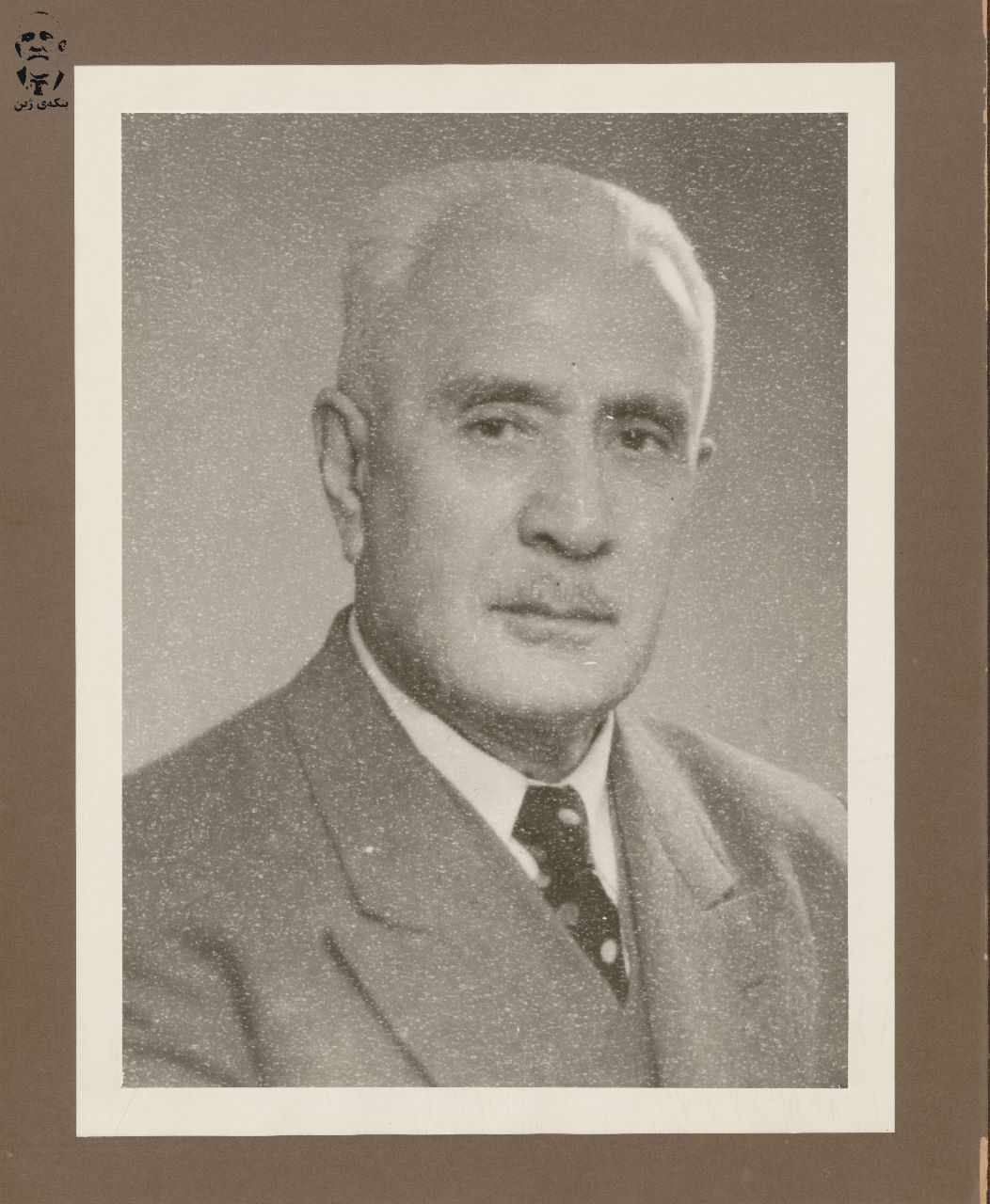
- Born: 1898; Kirkuk
- Died: 1960 (aged 61–62)
- Political party: Hîwa
- Children: Nahide Rafiq Hilmi

Rafiq Hilmi (Kurdish: ڕەفیق حیلمی, romanized: Refîq Hilmî, 1898–1960) was a Kurdish historian, writer and politician born in Kirkuk. He was founder of the Kurdish party Hîwa in 1938 and author of many books on the history of Kurdistan and Kurdish language. After attending school in Sulaimania and Baghdad, he continued his studies at the Military Academy and Technical School of Istanbul.

== Literary Life ==
Early in his career he wrote for two Kurdish newspapers: Rojî Kurdistan, the official newspaper of the Kingdom of Kurdistan, and Bangî Kurdistan. He was recognized as a talented literary critic after the second volume of his Kurdish Poetry and Literature was published in 1956. In this work for the first time Goran's poetry and characteristics of the modernist literary movement which he represented were studied and analyzed in depth.

== Political life and Hîwa-Party ==
Rafiq Hilmi is well known in Kurdish politics as the founder of a party called Hîwa (Hope). It was initially a secret organization consisting of Kurdish intellectuals and civil servants. Under the influence of the predominantly Arab faculty in Kirkuk, a student movement called “Darker” (Darker is the Kurdish term for charcoal makers, but was about the Italian term of the “Carbonari”), which later became the Hîwa, was founded and led by Rafiq Hilmi in 1937, which openly acknowledged its great paragons, the Italian fascism under Mussolini and the German National Socialism under Hitler. These professors had presented to their students the national unifications that occurred under the rules of the Prince of Bismarck and Camillo Benso, Count of Cavour. Many Kurds saw this as a remarkable example of Kurdish unity. While the political program of Hîwa was a mainly nationalist one and focused on securing autonomy for Iraqi Kurdistan, many members were also leftist-minded. Later, as the opinions and political views within the party became more polarized, the Hîwa Party eventually fragmented. It was divided into two factions: a radical pro-German wing and a more moderate, pro-British wing.

Hîwa also had established links with activists of Komala JK in Mahabad and it sent two army officers Mustafa Khushnaw and Mir Haj Ahmad to the founding ceremony of Komala JK in September 1942. Hîwa maintained its links with Mahabad movement until the collapse of Republic of Mahabad in late 1946.

== Books ==
1. Kurd le Seretay Mêjûwewe ta kû 1920, (Kurds from the dawn of history to 1920), Mosul, 1934. (in Kurdish)
2. Kurdish Poetry and Literature, Vol. I, 1941.(in Kurdish)
3. Kurdish Poetry and Literature, Vol. II, 1956.(in Kurdish)
4. The History of Kurdistan
5. Kurdistan at the Dawn of the Century, 168 pp., New Hope Publishers, 1998. ISBN 91-973354-3-6 (in English)
6. The Science of Arithmetic (in Kurdish)
7. Yaddasht, Memoirs and the Sheikh Mahmud Revolution, 6 Volumes, Baghdad, 1956-1958. (in Kurdish)
8. Summary of the Kurdish Case (The Sévre Treaty)

== See also ==
- Kurds in World War II
- List of Kurdish scholars
