= Kurdish Sun =

National emblem

The Kurdish sun

The Kurdish Sun, also commonly referred to by its Kurdish name: Kurdish: ڕۆژ, romanized: Roj, is a burning golden sun and the national emblem of the Kurds. It's also found inside the flag of Kurdistan and the official flag of the Kurdistan Region. The sun disk of the emblem contains 21 rays of equal size and shape. According to Mehrdad Izady, who first designed the 21 rays, both the sun emblem and the number 21 hold religious and cultural importance in Yazidism, Yarsanism and Alevism, which he considers to be the native religions of Kurdistan. While designing the Kurdish Flag, Izady chose the 21 rays to symbolize the rebirth of the Kurdish nation, identity, and dignity.

== History ==
=== Flags used ===
The first version of the modern Kurdistan flag, adopted by Xoybûn in 1928 as the flag of the Republic of Ararat (1927-1930).

Flag adopted by the Republic of Mahabad in the mid-forties.

The third and current version of the flag, which was adopted by the Kurdistan Region in 1992 It is also used by the national Kurdish parties in Iran, Turkey, and Syria.

The flag of Iraq from 1959-1963 included The Kurdish Sun as well as Pan-Arab colors, to promote unity and Iraqi nationalism

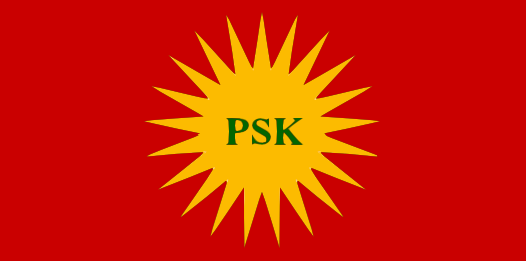
Flag of the Kurdistan Socialist Party based in Turkey, founded in early 1974

The Yazidi Movement for Reform and Progress is a Yazidi political party in Iraq.

The flag of the Ezidxan Protection Force, also known as the Sinjar alliance, was originally created in October 2015 to protect the Yezidi community from ISIL attacks.
